= 6th District Councils of Hong Kong =

6th District Councils of Hong Kong 香港第六屆區議會
←	5th	7th	→
- Affiliation of District Councillors as of 1 January 2020 (above) and as of 31 December 2023 (bottom; defection not shown); Pro-democracy Pro-Beijing Localist Non-aligned Vacant

Overview
- Jurisdiction: Hong Kong
- Term: 1 January 2020 to 31 December 2023
- Members: 479 (excluding vacancies)

The Sixth District Councils of Hong Kong (Chinese: 香港第六屆區議會) was the meeting of the local councils of the Hong Kong Special Administrative Region Government. The membership of the council is based on the 2019 election. The term of the session is from 1 January 2020 to 31 December 2023. The pro-democracy camp in conjunction with the localist camp achieved its biggest landslide victory in the history of Hong Kong, gaining absolute majority in votes and electoral seats in all of the 18 District Councils. The election was widely viewed as a de facto referendum on the 2019–20 Hong Kong protests.

== Overview ==
=== 18 District Councils Liaison ===
In February 2020, chairpersons and vice-chairpersons of 17 District Councils of which pro-democracy camp held the majority, along with a councilor representative from the remaining Islands District Council formed the "18 District Councils Liaison" to exchange views on city-wide and local issues. The unofficial Liaison led by pro-democracy politicians was the first all-District Council group in Hong Kong. Having 388 local councillors as members, the Liaison had made various statements including the objection to the Beijing-imposed National Security Law.

18 District Councils Liaison was disbanded on 15 May 2021, saying District Councils have been cooperating on livelihood agenda, and so the Liaison had finished its goal.

=== Seat vacancies ===
Unprecedented large number of District Councillors resigned or disqualified amid fast-changing political landscape in Hong Kong after protests. At least 290 out of 479 seats are now vacant, all were used to be held by pro-democracy and allied localist politicians.

Statistics of seat vacancies
Reasons		No.	Details
Resigned	(remanded in custody)	11	#Arrest of primaries participants
Resigned	(personal reasons)	20	#Other resignations
Resigned	(dissent political change)	5	#Other resignations
Resigned	(party dissolved)	2	#Other resignations
Resigned	(disqualification risk)	217	#Oath of office controversy
Resigned	(protest against oath-taking)	11	#Oath of office controversy
Disqualified	(unpatriotic)	3	#Oath of office controversy
Disqualified	(decline oath-taking)	2	#Oath of office controversy
Disqualified	(unpatriotic oath)	50	#Oath of office controversy
Disqualified	(jailed)	4	#Other disqualifications
Disqualified	(absented meetings)	4	#Other disqualifications
Disqualified	(unduly elected)	3	#Other disqualifications
Died in office		2	
Total		334	

==== Arrest of primaries participants ====
53 participants of 2020 Hong Kong pro-democracy primaries for the now-delayed Legislative Council election were arrested in January 2021. 47 of the arrested were charged under National Security Law in February, including 23 District Councillors, of which only 10 were granted bail as of September 2021. Those 13 councillors resigned between March and July 2021 due to inability to continue district work after remanded in custody, while the 10 freed from custody were either disqualified or had resigned.

==== Oath of office controversy ====
The Hong Kong Government tabled a bill to require all District Councillors to take oath of office in 2021 as the Chinese Government stressed the importance of patriotism for public officers. District Councillors deemed unpatriotic, including breaching the oath, or failing to uphold the Basic Law or to pledge allegiance to Hong Kong Government, could result in disqualification of office.

While explaining the bill in the parliament, Erick Tsang, Secretary for Constitutional and Mainland Affairs, named Fergus Leung, Tat Cheng, Lester Shum and Tiffany Yuen as the four councillors whom will be disqualified immediately after the bill was gazetted as their nominations in 2020 legislative election were invalid. As Leung and Cheng resigned before the bill came into force, only two were unseated by the authorities in accordance with the new law.

At least 10 members of District Councils resigned to protest against the new law although the details of the oath-taking ceremonies were yet to announce.

In early July 2021, local media started to report, citing unnamed sources, that the government will not allow around 230 councillors to take oath of office in the coming month, resulting in their disqualification or even to recover the remuneration since their inauguration which worth around a million dollars. The reports triggered a mass resignation of councilors to avoid the consequences of heavy financial burdens, leading to a total of at least 217 empty seats in District Councils.

On 10 September, District Councillors representing constituencies on Hong Kong Island took the oath of office. Peter Choi Chi-keung from the Eastern District declined to take oath on that day, and was immediately required to vacate his seat. An addition of 7 Councillors were also disqualified days later after their oath were invalidated, likely to be linked to their involvement in the pro-democracy primaries. The next round of oath-taking for Kowloon councillors was held on 24 September, 10 members' oath were invalidated, hence, along with Lee Man-ho who declined to take oath, were disqualified. Third round and fourth round for New Territories East and West was on 4 October and 8 October respectively, 16 councillors were disqualified.

==== Other disqualifications ====
According to District Councils Ordinance, any District Councillor convicted "of an offence for which the person has been sentenced to imprisonment, whether suspended or not, for a term exceeding 3 months without the option of a fine" would be disqualified. As a result, Leung Yiu-chung and Sin Chung-kai were unseated due to illegal assembly during the citywide protests, while Leung Kam-wai for his participation in Tiananmen vigil.

Ted Hui, Lee Ka-wai, Wong Hoi-ying were disqualified from holding office for the remainder of term of office after failed to attend meetings of the District Council for 4 consecutive months without obtaining the consent of the council before the end of that period. Hui, which faced at least 9 charges, has been in exile since December 2020. Lee reportedly travelled to Britain in March 2021 and only to announce the news four months later but insisted on not resigning. Wong on 31 December 2021 said she had left Hong Kong for her kids.

Hung Chun-hin and Lee Hin-long were determined by court to be not duly elected after pro-Beijing defeated councillors won the election petitions.

Young Ka-on was also unseated after court ruling, becoming the first pro-Beijing councillor leaving the District Council since the 2019 local election.

==== Other resignations ====
5 councilors resigned in wake of political changes since late 2020, including the imposition of National Security Law and electoral reform, saying the duties of local councils had been significantly limited. 15 councilors resigned for health, family or other personal reasons, which their resignation could also be related to the political environment in the aftermath of government's actions.

== Leadership ==
District	Chairperson	Term start	Term end	Constituency	Political Party	Ref
Central and Western	Cheng Lai-king	1 January 2020	9 July 2021	Castle Road	Democratic	
Wan Chai	Clarisse Yeung	1 January 2020	15 September 2021	Tai Hang	Ind. democrat	
Wan Chai	Ivan Wong	21 September 2021	31 December 2023	Stubbs Road	Independent	
Eastern	Joseph Lai	1 January 2020	9 July 2021	Fei Tsui	Civic	
Southern	Lo Kin-hei	1 January 2020	11 July 2021	Lei Tung II	Democratic	
Yau Tsim Mong	Lam Kin-man	1 January 2020	31 December 2023	Yau Ma Tei North	Ind. democrat	
Sham Shui Po	Yeung Yuk	1 January 2020	9 July 2021	Lai Chi Kok South	ADPL	
Sham Shui Po	Chum Tak-shing	12 July 2021	31 December 2023	Lai Chi Kok North	ADPL	
Kowloon City	Siu Leong-sing	1 January 2020	9 July 2021	Kadoorie	Democratic	
Kowloon City	Yang Wing-kit	9 September 2021	31 December 2023	Lok Man	Independent	
Wong Tai Sin	Hui Kam-shing	1 January 2020	8 July 2021	Chuk Yuen South	ADPL	
Kwun Tong	Choy Chak-hung	1 January 2020	20 July 2021	On Lee	Ind. democrat	
Kwun Tong	Wilson Or	7 September 2021	31 December 2023	Kwong Tak	DAB	
Tsuen Wan	Sumly Chan	1 January 2020	31 December 2023	Lei Muk Shue East	Civic	
Tuen Mun	Josephine Chan	1 January 2020	7 July 2021	Siu Hong	Democratic	
Yuen Long	Zachary Wong	1 January 2020	21 October 2021	Nam Ping	Democratic	
Yuen Long	Shum Ho-kit	26 October 2021	31 December 2023	Shap Pat Heung North	Independent	
North	Law Ting-tak	1 January 2020	31 December 2023	Queen's Hill	Ind. democrat	
Tai Po	Kwan Wing-yip	1 January 2020	8 July 2021	Fu Ming Sun	Neo Democrats	
Tai Po	Patrick Mo	7 September 2021	31 December 2023	Tai Po Kau	TPDA	
Sai Kung	Ben Chung	1 January 2020	11 May 2021	Yan Ying	Neo Democrats	
Sai Kung	Chau Yin-ming	25 May 2021	31 December 2023	Nam On	Ind. democrat	
Sha Tin	Ching Cheung-ying	1 January 2020	8 July 2021	Sun Tin Wai	Democratic	
Sha Tin	Li Chi-wang	22 July 2021	31 December 2023	Wo Che Estate	Ind. democrat	
Kwai Tsing	Sin Chung-kai	1 January 2020	28 May 2021	Wah Lai	Democratic	
Kwai Tsing	Simon Leung	13 July 2021	31 December 2023	Kwai Chung Estate North	Ind. democrat	
Islands	Randy Yu	1 January 2020	31 December 2023	Lantau	Independent	

== List of members ==
=== Hong Kong Island ===
==== Central and Western ====
Code	Constituency	Name	Political affiliation	Term start	Term end	Notes
A01	Chung Wan	Hui Chi-fung	Democratic	1 January 2020	29 May 2021	Disqualified (absented meetings)
A02	Mid Levels East	Ng Siu-hong	Democratic	1 January 2020	1 May 2021	Resigned (personal reasons)
A03	Castle Road	Cheng Lai-king	Democratic	1 January 2020	9 July 2021	Resigned (disqualification risk)
A04	Peak	Jeremy Young Chit-on	Liberal	1 January 2020	31 December 2023	
A05	University	Camille Yam Ka-yi	Ind. democrat	1 January 2020	12 July 2021	Resigned (disqualification risk)
A06	Kwun Lung	Fergus Leung Fong-wai	Ind. democrat	1 January 2020	1 May 2021	Resigned (remanded in custody)
A07	Kennedy Town & Mount Davis	Cherry Wong Kin-ching	Ind. democrat	1 January 2020	4 June 2021	Resigned (personal reasons)
A08	Sai Wan	Pang Ka-ho	VSA	1 January 2020	31 December 2023	
A09	Belcher	Victor Yeung Sui-yin	Democratic	1 January 2020	31 December 2023	
A10	Shek Tong Tsui	Sam Yip Kam-lung	Ind. democrat	1 January 2020	8 July 2021	Resigned (disqualification risk)
A11	Sai Ying Pun	Wong Weng-chi	Ind. democrat	1 January 2020	11 July 2021	Resigned (disqualification risk)
A12	Sheung Wan	Kam Nai-wai	Democratic	1 January 2020	8 July 2021	Resigned (disqualification risk)
A13	Tung Wah	Bonnie Ng Hoi-yan	Democratic	1 January 2020	9 July 2021	Resigned (disqualification risk)
A14	Centre Street	Cheung Kai-yin	Democratic	1 January 2020	9 July 2021	Resigned (disqualification risk)
A15	Water Street	Ho Chi-wang	VSA	1 January 2020	27 May 2021	Resigned (personal reasons)

==== Wan Chai ====
Code	Constituency	Name	Political affiliation	Term start	Term end	Notes
B01	Hennessy	Sabina Koo Kwok-wai	Ind. democrat	1 January 2020	31 December 2023	
B02	Oi Kwan	Law Wai-shan	Ind. democrat	1 January 2020	9 July 2021	Resigned (disqualification risk)
B03	Canal Road	Mak King-sing	Ind. democrat	1 January 2020	9 July 2021	Resigned (disqualification risk)
B04	Causeway Bay	Cathy Yau Man-shan	Ind. democrat	1 January 2020	9 July 2021	Resigned (disqualification risk)
B05	Victoria Park	Li Wing-choi	Ind. democrat	1 January 2020	9 July 2021	Resigned (disqualification risk)
B06	Tin Hau	Chan Yuk-lam	Ind. democrat	1 January 2020	9 July 2021	Resigned (disqualification risk)
B07	Tai Hang	Clarisse Yeung Suet-ying	Ind. democrat	1 January 2020	15 September 2021	Resigned (unpatriotic oath)
B08	Jardine's Lookout	Wind Lam Wai-man	Liberal	1 January 2020	31 December 2023	
B09	Broadwood	Paul Tse Wai-chun	Independent	1 January 2020	31 December 2023	
B10	Happy Valley	Clara Cheung	Ind. democrat	1 January 2020	8 July 2021	Resigned (disqualification risk)
B11	Stubbs Road	Ivan Wong Wang-tai	Independent	1 January 2020	31 December 2023	
B12	Southorn	Lee Pik-yee	Independent	1 January 2020	31 December 2023	
B13	Tai Fat Hau	Leung Pak-kin	Ind. democrat	1 January 2020	15 September 2021	Resigned (unpatriotic oath)

==== Eastern ====
Code	Constituency	Name	Political affiliation	Term start	Term end	Notes
C01	Tai Koo Shing West	Andrew Chiu Ka-yin	Democratic/ PfD/PC	1 January 2020	8 July 2021	Resigned (disqualification risk)
C02	Tai Koo Shing East	Patrick Wong Chun-sing	Ind. democrat	1 January 2020	8 July 2021	Resigned (disqualification risk)
C03	Lei King Wan	Alice Wei Siu-lik	Ind. democrat	1 January 2020	15 September 2021	Resigned (unpatriotic oath)
C04	Sai Wan Ho	Mak Tak-ching	Labour	1 January 2020	9 July 2021	Resigned (disqualification risk)
C05	Aldrich Bay	So Yat-hang	Democratic	1 January 2020	15 September 2021	Resigned (unpatriotic oath)
C06	Shaukeiwan	Leung Wing-sze	Ind. democrat	1 January 2020	31 December 2023	
C07	A Kung Ngam	Kwok Chi-chung	SKWEF	1 January 2020	9 July 2021	Resigned (disqualification risk)
C08	Heng Fa Chuen	Christine Wong Yi	Ind. democrat	1 January 2020	1 April 2021	Resigned (personal reasons)
C09	Tsui Wan	Ku Kwai-yiu	Ind. democrat	1 January 2020	15 July 2021	Resigned (disqualification risk)
C10	Yan Lam	Alice Ishigami Lee Fung-king	PfD	1 January 2020	11 July 2021	Resigned (disqualification risk)
C11	Siu Sai Wan	Chan Wing-tai	PfD	1 January 2020	15 September 2021	Resigned (unpatriotic oath)
C12	King Yee	Phoenix Tsang Yan-ying	Ind. democrat	1 January 2020	1 June 2021	Resigned (protest against oath-taking)
C13	Wan Tsui	Peter Ng Cheuk-ip	Ind. democrat	1 January 2020	10 July 2021	Resigned (disqualification risk)
C14	Fei Tsui	Joseph Lai Chi-keong	Civic	1 January 2020	9 July 2021	Resigned (disqualification risk)
C15	Mount Parker	Annie Lee Ching-har	DAB	1 January 2020	31 December 2023	
C16	Braemar Hill	Kenny Yuen Kin-chung	Liberal	1 January 2020	31 December 2023	
C17	Fortress Hill	Jason Chan Ka-yau	Ind. democrat	1 January 2020	1 June 2021	Resigned (protest against oath-taking)
C18	City Garden	Jocelyn Chau Hui-yan	Ind. democrat	1 January 2020	31 December 2023	
C19	Provident	Kwok Wai-keung	FTU	1 January 2020	31 December 2023	
C20	Fort Street	Karrine Fu Kai-lam	Ind. democrat	1 January 2020	1 June 2021	Resigned (dissent political change)
C21	Kam Ping	Lee Yue-shun	Civic	1 January 2020	1 September 2021	Resigned (personal reasons)
C22	Tanner	Tat Cheng Tat-hung	Civic	1 January 2020	11 May 2021	Resigned (personal reasons)
C23	Healthy Village	James Pui Chi-lap	Ind. democrat	1 January 2020	9 July 2021	Resigned (disqualification risk)
C24	Quarry Bay	Kelly Chan Po-king	Ind. democrat	1 January 2020	8 July 2021	Resigned (disqualification risk)
C25	Nam Fung	Cheung Kwok-cheong	Democratic	1 January 2020	15 July 2021	Resigned (disqualification risk)
C26	Kornhill	Derek Ngai Chi-ho	Civic	1 January 2020	10 July 2021	Resigned (disqualification risk)
C27	Kornhill Garden	Leung Siu-sun	Civic	1 January 2020	9 July 2021	Resigned (disqualification risk)
C28	Hing Tung	Cheung Chun-kit	Ind. democrat	1 January 2020	8 July 2021	Resigned (disqualification risk)
C29	Lower Yiu Tung	Ho Wai-lun	Labour	1 January 2020	9 July 2021	Resigned (disqualification risk)
C30	Upper Yiu Tung	Chow Cheuk-ki	Democratic	1 January 2020	31 December 2023	
C31	Hing Man	Tse Miu-yee	Ind. democrat	1 January 2020	11 July 2021	Resigned (disqualification risk)
C32	Lok Hong	Bull Tsang Kin-shing	LSD	1 January 2020	8 July 2021	Resigned (disqualification risk)
C33	Tsui Tak	Peter Choi Chi-keung	Ind. democrat	1 January 2020	10 September 2021	Resigned (decline oath-taking)
C34	Yue Wan	Chui Chi-kin	Ind. democrat	1 January 2020	10 May 2021	Resigned (remanded in custody)
C35	Kai Hiu	Lai Tsz-yan	Ind. democrat	1 January 2020	15 September 2021	Resigned (unpatriotic oath)

==== Southern ====
Code	Constituency	Name	Political affiliation	Term start	Term end	Notes
D01	Aberdeen	Angus Wong Yui-hei	Ind. democrat	1 January 2020	9 July 2021	Resigned (disqualification risk)
D02	Ap Lei Chau Estate	Lam Yuk-chun	Independent	1 January 2020	31 December 2023	
D03	Ap Lei Chau North	Chan Ping-yeung	Democratic	1 January 2020	9 July 2021	Resigned (disqualification risk)
D04	Lei Tung I	Chan Yan-yi	Democratic	1 January 2020	9 July 2021	Resigned (disqualification risk)
D05	Lei Tung II	Lo Kin-hei	Democratic	1 January 2020	11 July 2021	Resigned (disqualification risk)
D06	South Horizons East	James Yu Chun-hei	Civic	1 January 2020	9 July 2021	Resigned (disqualification risk)
D07	South Horizons West	Kelvin Lam Ho-por	Ind. democrat	1 January 2020	11 July 2021	Resigned (disqualification risk)
D08	Wah Kwai	Poon Ping-hong	Democratic	1 January 2020	9 July 2021	Resigned (disqualification risk)
D09	Wah Fu South	Li Shee-lin	Democratic	1 January 2020	9 July 2021	Resigned (disqualification risk)
D10	Wah Fu North	Yim Chun-ho	Democratic	1 January 2020	9 July 2021	Resigned (disqualification risk)
D11	Pokfulam	Paulus Johannes Zimmerman	Ind. democrat	1 January 2020	31 December 2023	
D12	Chi Fu	Andrew Lam Tak-wo	Ind. democrat	1 January 2020	10 July 2021	Resigned (disqualification risk)
D13	Tin Wan	Tiffany Yuen Ka-wai	Ind. democrat	1 January 2020	21 May 2021	Resigned (unpatriotic)
D14	Shek Yue	Chan Hin-chung	Ind. democrat	1 January 2020	9 July 2021	Resigned (disqualification risk)
D15	Wong Chuk Hang	Tsui Yuen-wa	Democratic	1 January 2020	9 July 2021	Resigned (disqualification risk)
D16	Bays Area	Jonathan Leung Chun	Liberal	1 January 2020	31 December 2023	
D17	Stanley & Shek O	Michael Pang Cheuk-kei	Ind. democrat	1 January 2020	15 September 2021	Resigned (unpatriotic oath)

=== Kowloon ===
==== Yau Tsim Mong ====
Code	Constituency	Name	Political affiliation	Term start	Term end	Notes
E01	Tsim Sha Tsui West	Leslie Chan Ka-long	Ind. democrat	1 January 2020	16 July 2021	Resigned (disqualification risk)
E02	Kowloon Station	Derek Hung Chiu-wah	DAB	1 January 2020	31 December 2023	
E03	Jordan West	Natalie Tsui Wai-fong	PfD	1 January 2020	9 July 2021	Resigned (disqualification risk)
E04	Yau Ma Tei South	Suzanne Wu Sui-shan	Community March	1 January 2020	29 September 2021	Resigned (unpatriotic oath)
E05	Charming	Lee Wai-fung	Democratic	1 January 2020	31 December 2023	
E06	Mong Kok West	Hui Tak-leung	Independent	1 January 2020	31 December 2023	
E07	Fu Pak	Yu Tak-po	Civic	1 January 2020	11 July 2021	Resigned (disqualification risk)
E08	Olympic	James To Kun-sun	Democratic	1 January 2020	29 September 2021	Resigned (unpatriotic oath)
E09	Cherry	Chung Chak-fai	Independent	1 January 2020	31 December 2023	
E10	Tai Kok Tsui South	Tsang Tsz-ming	Democratic	1 January 2020	29 September 2021	Resigned (unpatriotic oath)
E11	Tai Kok Tsui North	Owan Li	Ind. democrat	1 January 2020	9 July 2021	Resigned (disqualification risk)
E12	Tai Nan	Lee Kwok-kuen	Community March	1 January 2020	8 July 2021	Resigned (disqualification risk)
E13	Mong Kok North	Lucifer Siu Tak-kin	Ind. democrat	1 January 2020	10 July 2021	Resigned (disqualification risk)
E14	Mong Kok East	Ben Lam	Community March	1 January 2020	9 July 2021	Resigned (disqualification risk)
E15	Mong Kok South	Chu Kong-wai	Community March	1 January 2020	29 September 2021	Resigned (unpatriotic oath)
E16	Yau Ma Tei North	Lam Kin-man	Ind. democrat	1 January 2020	31 December 2023	
E17	East Tsim Sha Tsui & King's Park	Leo Chu Tsz-lok	Democratic	1 January 2020	31 December 2023	
E18	Jordan North	Frank Ho Fu-wing	Ind. democrat	1 January 2020	31 December 2023	
E19	Jordan South	Chan Tsz-wai	Ind. democrat	1 January 2020	12 July 2021	Resigned (disqualification risk)
E20	Tsim Sha Tsui Central	Ho Cheuk-hin	Community March	1 January 2020	8 July 2021	Resigned (disqualification risk)

==== Sham Shui Po ====
Code	Constituency	Name	Political affiliation	Term start	Term end	Notes
F01	Po Lai	Mak Wai-ming	ADPL	1 January 2020	31 December 2023	
F02	Cheung Sha Wan	Leos Lee Man-ho	CSWCEP	1 January 2020	24 September 2021	Resigned (decline oath-taking)
F03	Nam Cheong North	Lao Ka-hang	Civic	1 January 2020	12 July 2021	Resigned (disqualification risk)
F04	Shek Kip Mei	Jeffrey Sin Kam-ho	Ind. democrat	1 January 2020	9 July 2021	Resigned (disqualification risk)
F05	Nam Cheong East	Kalvin Ho Kai-ming	ADPL	1 January 2020	12 July 2021	Resigned (disqualification risk)
F06	Nam Cheong South	Li Ting-fung	ADPL	1 January 2020	31 December 2023	
F07	Nam Cheong Central	Lau Pui-yuk	DAB	1 January 2020	31 December 2023	
F08	Nam Cheong West	Wai Woon-nam	ADPL	1 January 2020	8 July 2021	Resigned (disqualification risk)
F09	Fu Cheong	Wong Kit-long	CSWWF	1 January 2020	8 July 2021	Resigned (disqualification risk)
F10	Lai Kok	Li Kwing	ADPL	1 January 2020	8 July 2021	Resigned (disqualification risk)
F11	Fortune	Ronald Tsui Yat-hin	ADPL	1 January 2020	9 July 2021	Resigned (disqualification risk)
F12	Pik Wui	Zoe Chow Wing-heng	Democratic	1 January 2020	8 July 2021	Resigned (disqualification risk)
F13	Lai Chi Kok Central	Ramon Yuen Hoi-man	Democratic	1 January 2020	31 December 2023	
F14	Lai Chi Kok South	Yeung Yuk	ADPL	1 January 2020	9 July 2021	Resigned (disqualification risk)
F15	Mei Foo South	Chau Yuen-man	Civic	1 January 2020	1 June 2021	Resigned (personal reasons)
F16	Mei Foo Central	Ng Yuet-lan	Ind. democrat	1 January 2020	31 December 2023	
F17	Mei Foo North	Joshua Li Chun-hei	Civic	1 January 2020	8 July 2021	Resigned (disqualification risk)
F18	Lai Chi Kok North	Chum Tak-shing	ADPL	1 January 2020	31 December 2023	
F19	Un Chau	Lee Hon-ting	ADPL	1 January 2020	8 July 2021	Resigned (disqualification risk)
F20	So Uk	Ho Kwan-chau	DAB	1 January 2020	31 December 2023	
F21	Lei Cheng Uk	Kong Kwai-sang	ADPL	1 January 2020	9 July 2021	Resigned (disqualification risk)
F22	Lung Ping & Sheung Pak Tin	Carmen Ng Mei	Ind. democrat	1 January 2020	31 December 2023	
F23	Ha Pak Tin	Yan Kai-wing	Ind. democrat	1 January 2020	9 July 2021	Resigned (disqualification risk)
F24	Yau Yat Tsuen	Lau Wai-chung	Ind. democrat	1 January 2020	29 September 2021	Resigned (unpatriotic oath)
F25	Nam Shan, Tai Hang Tung & Tai Hang Sai	Tam Kwok-kiu	ADPL	1 January 2020	8 July 2021	Resigned (disqualification risk)

==== Kowloon City ====
Code	Constituency	Name	Political affiliation	Term start	Term end	Notes
G01	Ma Tau Wai	Tsang Kin-chiu	Ind. democrat	1 January 2020	29 September 2021	Resigned (unpatriotic oath)
G02	Sung Wong Toi	Yeung Chun-yu	Ind. democrat	1 January 2020	31 December 2023	
G03	Ma Hang Chung	Lai Kwong-wai	Democratic	1 January 2020	9 July 2021	Resigned (disqualification risk)
G04	Ma Tau Kok	Ma Hei-pang	Democratic	1 January 2020	9 July 2021	Resigned (disqualification risk)
G05	Lok Man	Yang Wing-kit	Independent	1 January 2020	31 December 2023	
G06	Sheung Lok	Wong Wing-kit	Democratic	1 January 2020	11 July 2021	Resigned (disqualification risk)
G07	Ho Man Tin	Joshua Fung Man-tao	Democratic	1 January 2020	9 July 2021	Resigned (disqualification risk)
G08	Kadoorie	Siu Leong-sing	Democratic	1 January 2020	9 July 2021	Resigned (disqualification risk)
G09	Prince	Wong Kwok-tung	Democratic	1 January 2020	31 December 2023	
G10	Kowloon Tong	Ho Hin-ming	Liberal	1 January 2020	31 December 2023	
G11	Lung Shing	Ng Po-keung	DAB	1 January 2020	31 December 2023	
G12	Kai Tak North	Leung Yuen-ting	BPA	1 January 2020	31 December 2023	
G13	Kai Tak East	He Huahan	BPA	1 January 2020	31 December 2023	
G14	Kai Tak Central & South	Cheung King-fan	Independent	1 January 2020	31 December 2023	
G15	Hoi Sham	Pun Kwok-wah	DAB	1 January 2020	31 December 2023	
G16	To Kwa Wan North	Starry Lee Wai-king	DAB	1 January 2020	31 December 2023	
G17	To Kwa Wan South	Lee Hin-long	Synergy Kowloon/PC	1 January 2020	25 March 2021	Disqualified (unduly elected)
G18	Hok Yuen Laguna Verde	Tony Kwok Tin-lap	Democratic/PC	1 January 2020	29 September 2021	Resigned (unpatriotic oath)
G19	Whampoa East	Kwan Ka-lun	Ind. democrat	1 January 2020	8 July 2021	Resigned (disqualification risk)
G20	Whampoa West	Kwong Po-yin	Ind. democrat	1 January 2020	8 July 2021	Resigned (disqualification risk)
G21	Hung Hom Bay	Pius Yum Kwok-tung	Democratic	1 January 2020	29 September 2021	Resigned (unpatriotic oath)
G22	Hung Hom	Lam Tak-shing	DAB	1 January 2020	31 December 2023	
G23	Ka Wai	Chau Hei-man	Democratic	1 January 2020	12 July 2021	Resigned (disqualification risk)
G24	Oi Man	Mak Sui-ki	Democratic	1 January 2020	11 July 2021	Resigned (disqualification risk)
G25	Oi Chun	Cho Wui-hung	BPA/KWND	1 January 2020	31 December 2023	

==== Wong Tai Sin ====
Code	Constituency	Name	Political affiliation	Term start	Term end	Notes
H01	Lung Tsui	Chong Ting-wai	Ind. democrat	1 January 2020	11 July 2021	Resigned (disqualification risk)
H02	Lung Ha	Kwok Sau-ying	Ind. democrat	1 January 2020	10 July 2021	Resigned (disqualification risk)
H03	Lung Sheung	Chan Chun-yue	Ind. democrat	1 January 2020	11 July 2021	Resigned (disqualification risk)
H04	Fung Wong	Tang Wai-keung	Democratic	1 January 2020	9 July 2021	Resigned (disqualification risk)
H05	Fung Tak	Cheung Ka-yi	TWSCP	1 January 2020	11 July 2021	Resigned (disqualification risk)
H06	Lung Sing	Tam Heung-man	Ind. democrat	1 January 2020	31 December 2023	
H07	San Po Kong	Chan Kai-shun	Ind. democrat	1 January 2020	8 July 2021	Resigned (disqualification risk)
H08	Tung Tau	Hiroko Wan Chi-chung	People Power	1 January 2020	13 July 2021	Resigned (disqualification risk)
H09	Tung Mei	Sze Tak-loy	ADPL	1 January 2020	9 July 2021	Resigned (disqualification risk)
H10	Lok Fu	Leung Ming-hong	Ind. democrat	1 January 2020	8 July 2021	Resigned (disqualification risk)
H11	Wang Tau Hom	Carmen Lau Ka-man	Civic	1 January 2020	9 June 2021	Resigned (protest against oath-taking)
H12	Tin Keung	Jay Cheng Man-kit	Civic	1 January 2020	9 July 2021	Resigned (disqualification risk)
H13	Tsui Chuk & Pang Ching	Yau Hon-pong	Ind. democrat	1 January 2020	9 July 2021	Resigned (disqualification risk)
H14	Chuk Yuen South	Hui Kam-shing	ADPL	1 January 2020	8 July 2021	Resigned (disqualification risk)
H15	Chuk Yuen North	Cheng Tsz-kin	Ind. democrat	1 January 2020	1 June 2021	Resigned (dissent political change)
H16	Tsz Wan West	Cheung Mau-ching	Democratic	1 January 2020	10 July 2021	Resigned (disqualification risk)
H17	Ching Oi	Sham Yu-hin	TWSCP	1 January 2020	11 July 2021	Resigned (disqualification risk)
H18	Ching On	Roger Wong Yat-yuk	Ind. democrat	1 January 2020	8 July 2021	Resigned (disqualification risk)
H19	Tsz Wan East	Mok Yee-ha	Ind. democrat	1 January 2020	10 July 2021	Resigned (disqualification risk)
H20	King Fu	Rosanda Mok Ka-han	Democratic	1 January 2020	9 July 2021	Resigned (disqualification risk)
H21	Choi Wan East	Liu Sing-lee	ADPL	1 January 2020	31 December 2023	
H22	Choi Wan South	Shum Wan-wa	Democratic	1 January 2020	9 July 2021	Resigned (disqualification risk)
H23	Choi Wan West	Chan Lee-shing	Democratic	1 January 2020	9 July 2021	Resigned (disqualification risk)
H24	Chi Choi	Wu Chi-kin	Democratic	1 January 2020	10 July 2021	Resigned (disqualification risk)
H25	Choi Hung	Sean Mock Ho-chit	CHESSA	1 January 2020	29 September 2021	Resigned (unpatriotic oath)

==== Kwun Tong ====
Code	Constituency	Name	Political affiliation	Term start	Term end	Notes
J01	Kwun Tong Central	Edith Leung Yik-ting	Democratic	1 January 2020	29 September 2021	Resigned (unpatriotic oath)
J02	Kowloon Bay	Winnie Poon Yam Wai-chun	Ind. democrat	1 January 2020	31 December 2023	
J03	Kai Yip	Wan Ka-him	Democratic	1 January 2020	9 July 2021	Resigned (disqualification risk)
J04	Lai Ching	Sheik Anthony Bux	Civic	1 January 2020	1 June 2021	Resigned (personal reasons)
J05	Ping Shek	Lai Po-kwai	Democratic	1 January 2020	31 December 2023	
J06	Choi Tak	Tam Siu-cheuk	DAB	1 January 2020	31 December 2023	
J07	Jordan Valley	Ngan Man-yu	DAB	1 January 2020	31 December 2023	
J08	Shun Tin	Mok Kin-shing	Democratic	1 January 2020	20 July 2021	Resigned (disqualification risk)
J09	Sheung Shun	Fu Pik-chun	Independent	1 January 2020	31 December 2023	
J10	On Lee	Choy Chak-hung	Ind. democrat	1 January 2020	20 July 2021	Resigned (disqualification risk)
J11	Kwun Tong On Tai	Lam Wai	FPHE	1 January 2020	31 December 2023	
J12	Sau Mau Ping North	Raymond Tang Wai-man	Ind. democrat	1 January 2020	12 July 2021	Resigned (disqualification risk)
J13	Sau Mau Ping Central	Cheung Pui-kong	DAB	1 January 2020	31 December 2023	
J14	On Tat	Hsu Yau-wai	DAB	1 January 2020	31 December 2023	
J15	Sau Mau Ping South	Jimmy Chan Yiu-hung	Independent	1 January 2020	31 December 2023	
J16	Po Tat	Fung Ka-lung	Ind. democrat	1 January 2020	9 July 2021	Resigned (disqualification risk)
J17	Kwong Tak	Wilson Or Chong-shing	DAB	1 January 2020	31 December 2023	
J18	Hing Tin	Nelson Ip Tsz-kit	Democratic	1 January 2020	10 July 2021	Resigned (disqualification risk)
J19	Lam Tin	Kan Ming-tung	FTU/DAB	1 January 2020	31 December 2023	
J20	Ping Tin	Eason Chan Yik-shun	Ind. democrat	1 January 2020	12 July 2021	Resigned (disqualification risk)
J21	Pak Nga	Chan Man-kin	Democratic	1 January 2020	10 July 2021	Resigned (disqualification risk)
J22	Chun Cheung	Tse Suk-chun	Ind. democrat	1 January 2020	31 December 2023	
J23	Yau Tong East	Kung Chun-ki	Ind. democrat	1 January 2020	19 July 2021	Resigned (disqualification risk)
J24	Yau Chui	Pang Chi-sang	FPHE	1 January 2020	31 December 2023	
J25	Yau Lai	Wang Wai-lun	Ind. democrat	1 January 2020	18 July 2021	Resigned (disqualification risk)
J26	Yau Tong West	Lui Tung-hai	Independent	1 January 2020	31 December 2023	
J27	Laguna City	William Li Wai-lam	Civic	1 January 2020	12 July 2021	Resigned (disqualification risk)
J28	King Tin	Wong Ka-ying	Civic	1 January 2020	11 July 2021	Resigned (disqualification risk)
J29	Tsui Ping	Hung Chun-hin	Democratic	1 January 2020	4 May 2021	Disqualified (unduly elected)
J30	Hiu Lai	Wilson Cheung Man-fung	Ind. democrat	1 January 2020	18 July 2021	Resigned (disqualification risk)
J31	Po Lok	Cheng Keng-ieong	Democratic	1 January 2020	9 July 2021	Resigned (disqualification risk)
J32	Yuet Wah	Jannelle Rosalynne Leung	Ind. democrat	1 January 2020	10 July 2021	Resigned (disqualification risk)
J33	Hip Hong	Li Ka-tat	CAP	1 January 2020	19 April 2021	Resigned (remanded in custody)
J34	Lok Wah South	Kevin So Koon-chung	Ind. democrat	1 January 2020	31 December 2023	
J35	Lok Wah North	Wong Chi-ken	KEC	1 January 2020	20 July 2021	Resigned (disqualification risk)
J36	Hong Lok	Chris Chan Ka-yin	Ind. democrat	1 January 2020	1 June 2021	Resigned (personal reasons)
J37	Ting On	Wong Kai-ming	Democratic	1 January 2020	10 July 2021	Resigned (disqualification risk)
J38	Upper Ngau Tau Kok Estate	Leung Tang-fung	DAB	1 January 2020	31 December 2023	
J39	Lower Ngau Tau Kok Estate	Li Wing-shan	Ind. democrat	1 January 2020	9 July 2021	Resigned (disqualification risk)
J40	To Tai	Lee Kwan-chak	Civic	1 January 2020	11 July 2021	Resigned (disqualification risk)

=== New Territories ===
==== Tsuen Wan ====
Code	Constituency	Name	Political affiliation	Term start	Term end	Notes
K01	Tak Wah	Jackson Lau	Deliberation TW	1 January 2020	11 July 2021	Resigned (disqualification risk)
K02	Yeung Uk Road	Lam Sek-tim	TWCN	1 January 2020	21 October 2021	Disqualified (unpatriotic oath)
K03	Tsuen Wan South	Antonio Luk Ling-chung	Civic	1 January 2020	31 December 2023	
K04	Hoi Bun	Lester Shum	Team Chu	1 January 2020	21 May 2021	Resigned (unpatriotic)
K05	Tsuen Wan West	Angus Yick Shing-chung	Democratic	1 January 2020	11 July 2021	Resigned (disqualification risk)
K06	Clague Garden	Chan Kim-kam	Ind. democrat	1 January 2020	12 July 2021	Resigned (disqualification risk)
K07	Tsuen Wan Centre	Li Hung-por	Democratic	1 January 2020	21 October 2021	Disqualified (unpatriotic oath)
K08	Discovery Park	Lau Cheuk-yu	Ind. democrat	1 January 2020	31 December 2023	
K09	Fuk Loi	Kot Siu-yuen	FTU	1 January 2020	31 December 2023	
K10	Luk Yeung	Roy Pun Long-chung	Neo Democrats	1 January 2020	8 July 2021	Resigned (disqualification risk)
K11	Ma Wan	Tam Hoi-pong	Neo Democrats	1 January 2020	20 April 2021	Resigned (remanded in custody)
K12	Tsuen Wan Rural	Norris Ng Hin-lung	Independent	1 January 2020	9 July 2021	Resigned (disqualification risk)
K13	Ting Sham	Lau Chi-hung	Ind. democrat	1 January 2020	9 July 2021	Resigned (disqualification risk)
K14	Lai To	Ronald Tse Man-chak	Ind. democrat	1 January 2020	9 July 2021	Resigned (disqualification risk)
K15	Allway	Chiu Yan-loy	Labour	1 January 2020	18 July 2021	Resigned (disqualification risk)
K16	Cheung Shek	Matthew Lai Man-fai	Democratic	1 January 2020	13 July 2021	Resigned (disqualification risk)
K17	Shek Wai Kok	Man Yue-ming	FPHE/NTAS	1 January 2020	31 December 2023	
K18	Lei Muk Shue West	Wong Ka-wa	Civic	1 January 2020	31 December 2023	
K19	Lei Muk Shue East	Sumly Chan Yuen-sum	Civic	1 January 2020	31 December 2023	
Ex Officio	Ma Wan Rural; Committee Chairman	Chan Sung-ip	Independent	1 January 2020	31 December 2023	
Ex Officio	Tsuen Wan Rural; Committee Chairman	Yau Kam-ping	Independent	1 January 2020	31 December 2023	

==== Tuen Mun ====
Code	Constituency	Name	Political affiliation	Term start	Term end	Notes
L01	Tuen Mun Town Centre	Alfred Lai Chun-wing	Democratic	1 January 2020	7 July 2021	Resigned (disqualification risk)
L02	Siu Chi	Lam Chung-hoi	Ind. democrat	1 January 2020	31 December 2023	
L03	On Ting	Kong Fung-yi	ADPL	1 January 2020	31 December 2023	
L04	Siu Tsui	Yan Pui-lam	Team Chu	1 January 2020	8 July 2021	Resigned (disqualification risk)
L05	Yau Oi South	Lam Kin-cheung	Labour	1 January 2020	8 July 2021	Resigned (disqualification risk)
L06	Yau Oi North	Lam Ming-yan	Labour	1 January 2020	8 July 2021	Resigned (disqualification risk)
L07	Tsui Hing	Poon Chi-kin	TMCN	1 January 2020	31 December 2023	
L08	Shan King	Wong Tan-ching	TMCN	1 January 2020	31 December 2023	
L09	King Hing	Chan Yau-hoi	FTU	1 January 2020	31 December 2023	
L10	Hing Tsak	Tsang Chun-hing	TMCN	1 January 2020	10 July 2021	Resigned (disqualification risk)
L11	San Hui	Sam Cheung Ho-sum	TMCN	1 January 2020	11 May 2021	Resigned (remanded in custody)
L12	So Kwun Wat	Ma Kee	Democratic	1 January 2020	1 June 2021	Resigned (protest against oath-taking)
L13	Sam Shing	Michael Mo Kwan-tai	Ind. democrat	1 January 2020	9 July 2021	Resigned (disqualification risk)
L14	Hanford	Beatrice Chu Shun-nga	Ind. democrat	1 January 2020	9 July 2021	Resigned (disqualification risk)
L15	Yuet Wu	Wong Hung-ming	ADPL	1 January 2020	31 December 2023	
L16	Siu Hei	Yan Siu-nam	ADPL	1 January 2020	31 December 2023	
L17	Wu King	Chow Kai-lim	ADPL	1 January 2020	31 December 2023	
L18	Butterfly	Yeung Chi-hang	ADPL	1 January 2020	9 July 2021	Resigned (disqualification risk)
L19	Fu Sun	Lee Ka-wai	Ind. democrat	1 January 2020	17 July 2021	Disqualified (absented meetings)
L20	Lok Tsui	Lo Chun-yu	Democratic	1 January 2020	8 July 2021	Resigned (disqualification risk)
L21	Lung Mun	Tsang Kam-wing	LMCG	1 January 2020	21 October 2021	Disqualified (unpatriotic oath)
L22	San King	Catherine Wong Lai-sheung	Democratic	1 January 2020	8 July 2021	Resigned (disqualification risk)
L23	Leung King	Wong Tak-yuen	TMCN	1 January 2020	31 December 2023	
L24	Tin King	Leung Ho-man	Ind. democrat	1 January 2020	31 December 2023	
L25	Po Tin	So Ka-man	Independent	1 January 2020	31 December 2023	
L26	Kin Sang	Law Pei-lee	Team Chu	1 January 2020	9 July 2021	Resigned (disqualification risk)
L27	Siu Hong	Josephine Chan Shu-ying	Democratic	1 January 2020	7 July 2021	Resigned (disqualification risk)
L28	Yan Tin	Apple Lai Ka-man	DAB/NTAS	1 January 2020	31 December 2023	
L29	Tuen Mun Rural	Kenneth Cheung Kam-hung	Ind. democrat	1 January 2020	21 October 2021	Disqualified (unpatriotic oath)
L30	Fu Tai	Ho Kwok-ho	Empowering HK	1 January 2020	9 July 2021	Resigned (disqualification risk)
L31	Prime View	Ho Hang-mui	Democratic	1 January 2020	8 July 2021	Resigned (disqualification risk)
Ex Officio	Tuen Mun Rural; Committee Chairman	Kenneth Lau Ip-keung	BPA	1 January 2020	31 December 2023	

==== Yuen Long ====
Code	Constituency	Name	Political affiliation	Term start	Term end	Notes
M01	Fung Nin	Kisslan Chan King-lun	Ind. democrat	1 January 2020	15 July 2021	Resigned (disqualification risk)
M02	Yuen Long Centre	Shek King-ching	Democratic Alliance	1 January 2020	13 July 2021	Resigned (disqualification risk)
M03	Fung Cheung	Mak Ip-sing	Democratic Alliance	1 January 2020	13 July 2021	Resigned (disqualification risk)
M04	Yuen Lung	Cheung Sau-yin	Ind. democrat	1 January 2020	22 October 2021	Resigned (personal reasons)
M05	Shap Pat Heung Central	Willis Fong Ho-hin	Action 18	1 January 2020	9 July 2021	Resigned (disqualification risk)
M06	Shui Pin	Lai Kwok-wing	Team Chu	1 January 2020	21 October 2021	Disqualified (unpatriotic oath)
M07	Nam Ping	Zachary Wong Wai-yin	Democratic	1 January 2020	21 October 2021	Disqualified (unpatriotic oath)
M08	Pek Long	Kwong Chun-yu	Democratic	1 January 2020	21 October 2021	Disqualified (unpatriotic oath)
M09	Yuen Long Tung Tau	Lam Ting-wai	Democratic	1 January 2020	13 July 2021	Resigned (disqualification risk)
M10	Shap Pat Heung North	Shum Ho-kit	Independent	1 January 2020	31 December 2023	
M11	Shap Pat Heung East	Lee Chun-wai	Action 18	1 January 2020	12 July 2021	Resigned (disqualification risk)
M12	Shap Pat Heung West	Szeto Pok-man	Ind. democrat	1 January 2020	1 June 2021	Resigned (personal reasons)
M13	Ping Shan South	Leung Tak-ming	Team Chu	1 January 2020	8 July 2021	Resigned (disqualification risk)
M14	Hung Fuk	Eddie Chan Shu-fai	Team Chu	1 January 2020	8 July 2021	Resigned (disqualification risk)
M15	Ha Tsuen	Tang Ka-leung	Independent	1 January 2020	31 December 2023	
M16	Ping Shan Central	Felix Cheung Chi-yeung	Ind. democrat	1 January 2020	21 October 2021	Disqualified (unpatriotic oath)
M17	Shing Yan	Au Kwok-kuen	Team Chu	1 January 2020	8 July 2021	Resigned (disqualification risk)
M18	Tin Shing	Hau Man-kin	TSW Connection	1 January 2020	8 July 2021	Resigned (disqualification risk)
M19	Tin Yiu	Ho Wai-pan	Ind. democrat	1 January 2020	14 July 2021	Resigned (disqualification risk)
M20	Yiu Yau	Ng Hin-wang	Democratic	1 January 2020	21 October 2021	Disqualified (unpatriotic oath)
M21	Tsz Yau	Chan Mei-lin	Ind. democrat	1 January 2020	11 October 2021	Resigned (personal reasons)
M22	Kingswood South	Katy Ng Yuk-ying	Democratic	1 January 2020	13 July 2021	Resigned (disqualification risk)
M23	Shui Oi	Lai Po-wa	Democratic	1 January 2020	21 October 2021	Disqualified (unpatriotic oath)
M24	Shui Wah	Lam Chun	TSW Connection	1 January 2020	8 July 2021	Resigned (disqualification risk)
M25	Chung Wah	Chan Sze-nga	Ind. democrat	1 January 2020	21 October 2021	Disqualified (unpatriotic oath)
M26	Chung Pak	Lee Wai-fung	TSWLPU	1 January 2020	21 October 2021	Disqualified (unpatriotic oath)
M27	Kingswood North	Ng Kin-wai	TSW Connection	1 January 2020	10 May 2021	Resigned (remanded in custody)
M28	Yuet Yan	Hong Chin-wah	Ind. democrat	1 January 2020	14 July 2021	Resigned (disqualification risk)
M29	Ching King	Kwok Man-ho	Democratic	1 January 2020	11 July 2021	Resigned (disqualification risk)
M30	Fu Yan	Kwan Chun-sang	TSW Connection	1 January 2020	9 July 2021	Resigned (disqualification risk)
M31	Yat Chak	Wong Wing-sze	Civic Passion	1 January 2020	3 September 2021	Resigned (party dissolved)
M32	Tin Heng	Wong Pak-yu	Ind. democrat	1 January 2020	5 May 2021	Resigned (remanded in custody)
M33	Wang Yat	Mo Kai-hong	Ind. democrat	1 January 2020	12 July 2021	Resigned (disqualification risk)
M34	Ping Shan North	Young Ka-on	Independent	1 January 2020	28 September 2021	Disqualified (unduly elected)
M35	Fairview Park	To Ka-lun	Ind. democrat	1 January 2020	1 May 2021	Resigned (protest against oath-taking)
M36	San Tin	Man Fu-wan	Independent	1 January 2020	31 December 2023	
M37	Kam Tin	Chris Li Chung-chi	Ind. democrat	1 January 2020	31 December 2023	
M38	Pat Heung North	Ronnie Tang Yung-yiu	Independent	1 January 2020	31 December 2023	
M39	Pat Heung South	Lai Wing-tim	Independent	1 January 2020	31 December 2023	
Ex offico	Shap Pat Heung Rural; Committee Chairman	Ching Chan-ming	Independent	1 January 2020	31 December 2023	
Ex offico	San Tin Rural; Committee Chairman	Jimmy Man Mei-kwai	Independent	1 January 2020	9 December 2022	Died in office
Ex offico	Ha Tsuen Rural; Committee Chairman	Tang Lai-tung	Independent	1 January 2020	31 December 2023	
Ex offico	Kam Tin Rural; Committee Chairman	Tang Ho-lin	Independent	1 January 2020	31 December 2023	
Ex offico	Ping Shan Rural; Committee Chairman	Tang Che-keung	Independent	1 January 2020	31 December 2023	
Ex offico	Pat Heung Rural; Committee Chairman	Tang Shui-man	Independent	1 January 2020	31 December 2023	

==== North ====
Code	Constituency	Name	Political affiliation	Term start	Term end	Notes
N01	Luen Wo Hui	Chow Kam-ho	Ind. democrat	1 January 2020	31 December 2023	
N02	Fanling Town	Wong Hoi-ying	Democratic	1 January 2020	1 January 2022	Disqualified (absented meetings)
N03	Cheung Wah	Chan Yuk-ming	Democratic	1 January 2020	8 July 2021	Resigned (disqualification risk)
N04	Wah Do	Cheung Chun-wai	Ind. democrat	1 January 2020	31 December 2023	
N05	Wah Ming	Chan Wai-tat	Neo Democrats	1 January 2020	8 July 2021	Resigned (disqualification risk)
N06	Yan Shing	Lam Shuk-ching	Neo Democrats	1 January 2020	1 June 2021	Resigned (protest against oath-taking)
N07	Fanling South	Franco Cheung Ching-ho	Ind. democrat	1 January 2020	9 July 2021	Resigned (disqualification risk)
N08	Shing Fuk	Warick Wan Wo-tat	FTU	1 January 2020	31 December 2023	
N09	Ching Ho	Yuen Ho-lun	Ind. democrat	1 January 2020	1 June 2021	Resigned (protest against oath-taking)
N10	Yu Tai	Vincent Chan Chi-fung	Ind. democrat	1 January 2020	12 July 2021	Resigned (disqualification risk)
N11	Sheung Shui Rural	Simon Hau Fuk-tat	Ind. democrat	1 January 2020	31 December 2023	
N12	Choi Yuen	Lam Tsz-king	Democratic	1 January 2020	8 July 2021	Resigned (disqualification risk)
N13	Shek Wu Hui	Lam Cheuk-ting	Democratic	1 January 2020	31 March 2021	Resigned (remanded in custody)
N14	Tin Ping West	Kwok Long-fung	Democratic	1 January 2020	11 July 2021	Resigned (disqualification risk)
N15	Fung Tsui	Chiang Man-ching	Ind. democrat	1 January 2020	8 July 2021	Resigned (disqualification risk)
N16	Sha Ta	Ko Wai-kei	DAB/NTAS	1 January 2020	31 December 2023	
N17	Tin Ping East	Lau Ki-fung	Neo Democrats	1 January 2020	8 July 2021	Resigned (personal reasons)
N18	Queen's Hill	Law Ting-tak	Ind. democrat	1 January 2020	31 December 2023	
Ex officio	Ta Kwu Ling Rural; Committee Chairman	Chan Yuet-ming	Ind. democrat	1 January 2020	31 December 2023	
Ex officio	Sheung Shui Rural; Committee Chairman	Hau Chi-keung	Ind. democrat	1 January 2020	31 December 2023	
Ex officio	Sha Tau Kok Rural; Committee Chairman	Lau Tin-sang	Independent	1 January 2020	31 December 2023	
Ex officio	Fanling Rural; Committee Chairman	Lee Kwok-fung	Independent	1 January 2020	31 December 2023	

==== Tai Po ====
Code	Constituency	Name	Political affiliation	Term start	Term end	Notes
P01	Tai Po Hui	Nick Lam Ming-yat	TPDA	1 January 2020	12 May 2021	Resigned (personal reasons)
P02	Chung Ting	Man Nim-chi	Community Alliance/TPDA	1 January 2020	13 July 2021	Resigned (disqualification risk)
P03	Tai Po Central	Ray Au Chun-wah	Community Alliance/TPDA	1 January 2020	21 July 2021	Resigned (disqualification risk)
P04	Tai Yuen	Au Chun-ho	Community Alliance/TPDA	1 January 2020	31 December 2023	
P05	Fu Heng	Ho Wai-lam	Ind. democrat	1 January 2020	31 December 2023	
P06	Yee Fu	Yam Kai-bong	Neo Democrats	1 January 2020	8 July 2021	Resigned (disqualification risk)
P07	Fu Ming Sun	Kwan Wing-yip	Neo Democrats	1 January 2020	8 July 2021	Resigned (disqualification risk)
P08	Kwong Fuk & Plover Cove	Dalu Lin Kok-cheung	Ind. democrat	1 January 2020	11 May 2021	Resigned (dissent political change)
P09	Wang Fuk	Herman Yiu Kwan-ho	Community Alliance/TPDA	1 January 2020	6 June 2022	Disqualified (unpatriotic oath)
P10	Tai Po Kau	Patrick Mo Ka-chun	TPDA	1 January 2020	31 December 2023	
P11	Wan Tau Tong	Wong Siu-kin	Civic Passion	1 January 2020	3 September 2021	Resigned (party dissolved)
P12	San Fu	Max Wu Yiu-cheong	Neo Democrats	1 January 2020	11 May 2021	Resigned (dissent political change)
P13	Lam Tsuen Valley	Richard Chan Chun-chit	TPDA	1 January 2020	8 October 2021	Disqualified (unpatriotic oath)
P14	Po Nga	Paul Chow Yuen-wai	Neo Democrats	1 January 2020	12 July 2021	Resigned (personal reasons)
P15	Tai Wo	Olive Chan Wai-ka	Ind. democrat	1 January 2020	8 October 2021	Disqualified (unpatriotic oath)
P16	Old Market & Serenity	Ken Lau Yung-wai	Ind. democrat	1 January 2020	31 December 2023	
P17	Hong Lok Yuen	Manson Yiu Yeuk-sang	Ind. democrat	1 January 2020	17 May 2021	Resigned (personal reasons)
P18	Shuen Wan	So Tat-leung	Ind. democrat	1 January 2020	8 October 2021	Disqualified (unpatriotic oath)
P19	Sai Kung North	Tam Yi-pui	Ind. democrat	1 January 2020	31 December 2023	
Ex Officio	Tai Po Rural; Committee Chairman	Lam Yick-kuen	Independent	1 January 2020	31 December 2023	
Ex Officio	Sai Kung North Rural; Committee Chairman	Li Yiu-ban	Independent	1 January 2020	31 December 2023	

==== Sai Kung ====
Code	Constituency	Name	Political affiliation	Term start	Term end	Notes
Q01	Sai Kung Central	Zoe Leung Hin-yan	Sai Kung Commons	1 January 2020	10 July 2021	Resigned (disqualification risk)
Q02	Pak Sha Wan	Stanley Ho Wai-hong	Sai Kung Commons/Labour	1 January 2020	13 July 2021	Resigned (disqualification risk)
Q03	Sai Kung Islands	Debby Chan Ka-lam	Ind. democrat	1 January 2020	12 July 2021	Resigned (disqualification risk)
Q04	Hang Hau East	Ryan Lee Yin-ho	CGPLTKO/CA	1 January 2020	8 October 2021	Disqualified (unpatriotic oath)
Q05	Hang Hau West	Yu Tsun-ning	TKO Shining	1 January 2020	30 September 2021	Resigned (personal reasons)
Q06	Choi Kin	Chan Wai-lit	TKO Pioneers	1 January 2020	8 July 2021	Resigned (disqualification risk)
Q07	Kin Ming	Leung Li	Neo Democrats	1 January 2020	1 June 2021	Resigned (personal reasons)
Q08	Do Shin	Cheung Chin-pang	Independent	1 January 2020	31 December 2023	
Q09	Wai King	Brandon Kenneth Yip	TKO Shining	1 January 2020	11 July 2021	Resigned (disqualification risk)
Q10	Hoi Chun	Ivan Lai Wai-tong	Neo Democrats	1 January 2020	12 July 2021	Resigned (disqualification risk)
Q11	Po Yee	Tse Ching-fung	CGPLTKO	1 January 2020	13 July 2021	Resigned (disqualification risk)
Q12	Fu Kwan	Luk Ping-choi	CGPLTKO/CA	1 January 2020	13 July 2021	Resigned (disqualification risk)
Q13	O Tong	Lui Man-kwong	Neo Democrats	1 January 2020	13 July 2021	Resigned (disqualification risk)
Q14	Sheung Tak	Lee Ka-yui	CGPLTKO	1 January 2020	8 October 2021	Disqualified (unpatriotic oath)
Q15	Kwong Ming	Ricky Or Yiu-lam	CGPLTKO/CA	1 January 2020	8 October 2021	Disqualified (unpatriotic oath)
Q16	Hong King	Frankie Lam Siu-chung	Neo Democrats	1 January 2020	12 July 2021	Resigned (disqualification risk)
Q17	Tsui Lam	Choi Ming-hei	Ind. democrat	1 January 2020	31 December 2023	
Q18	Po Lam	Fung Kwan-on	Neo Democrats	1 January 2020	9 July 2021	Resigned (disqualification risk)
Q19	Yan Ying	Ben Chung Kam-lun	Neo Democrats	1 January 2020	11 May 2021	Resigned (remanded in custody)
Q20	Wai Yan	Chun Hoi-shing	Neo Democrats	1 January 2020	13 July 2021	Resigned (disqualification risk)
Q21	Wan Hang	Gary Fan Kwok-wai	Neo Democrats	1 January 2020	16 March 2021	Resigned (remanded in custody)
Q22	King Lam	Cheung Wai-chiu	TKO Pioneers	1 January 2020	9 July 2021	Resigned (disqualification risk)
Q23	Hau Tak	Wong Cheuk-nga	Community Alliance	1 January 2020	8 October 2021	Disqualified (unpatriotic oath)
Q24	Fu Nam	Andrew Chan Yiu-chor	CGPLTKO/CA	1 January 2020	31 December 2023	
Q25	Tak Ming	Cheng Chung-man	Ind. democrat	1 January 2020	13 July 2021	Resigned (disqualification risk)
Q26	Nam On	Francis Chau Yin-ming	Ind. democrat	1 January 2020	31 December 2023	
Q27	Kwan Po	Lai Ming-chak	Neo Democrats	1 January 2020	1 May 2021	Resigned (protest against oath-taking)
Q28	Wan Po North	Christine Fong Kwok-shan	Independent	1 January 2020	31 December 2023	
Q29	Wan Po South	Chris Cheung Mei-hung	Independent	1 January 2020	31 December 2023	
Ex Officio	Hang Hau Rural; Committee Chairman	Lau Kai-hong	Independent	1 January 2020	31 December 2023	
Ex Officio	Sai Kung Rural; Committee Chairman	Wong Shui-sang	Independent	1 January 2020	31 December 2023	

==== Sha Tin ====
Code	Constituency	Name	Political affiliation	Term start	Term end	Notes
R01	Sha Tin Town Centre	Wai Hing-cheung	Ind. democrat	1 January 2020	31 December 2023	
R02	Lek Yuen	Jimmy Sham Tsz-kit	LSD	1 January 2020	8 July 2021	Resigned (disqualification risk)
R03	Wo Che Estate	Li Chi-wang	Ind. democrat	1 January 2020	8 October 2021	Disqualified (unpatriotic oath)
R04	City One	Wong Man-huen	Civic	1 January 2020	4 June 2021	Resigned (protest against oath-taking)
R05	Yue Shing	William Shek	Community Sha Tin/Ind. democrat	1 January 2020	8 October 2021	Disqualified (unpatriotic oath)
R06	Wong Uk	Lai Tsz-yan	Community Sha Tin	1 January 2020	8 October 2021	Disqualified (unpatriotic oath)
R07	Sha Kok	Billy Chan Shiu-yeung	Ind. democrat	1 January 2020	7 July 2021	Resigned (disqualification risk)
R08	Pok Hong	Chiu Chu-pong	Community Sha Tin	1 January 2020	9 July 2021	Resigned (disqualification risk)
R09	Shui Chuen O	Lo Tak-ming	Community Sha Tin	1 January 2020	8 October 2021	Disqualified (unpatriotic oath)
R10	Jat Chuen	Yau Man-chun	Ind. democrat	1 January 2020	9 July 2021	Resigned (disqualification risk)
R11	Chun Fung	Chan Nok-hang	Community Sha Tin	1 January 2020	30 September 2021	Resigned (personal reasons)
R12	Sun Tin Wai	Ching Cheung-ying	Democratic	1 January 2020	8 July 2021	Resigned (disqualification risk)
R13	Chui Tin	Hui Yui-yu	Ind. democrat	1 January 2020	9 July 2021	Resigned (disqualification risk)
R14	Hin Ka	Chan Wang-tung	Ind. democrat	1 January 2020	8 July 2021	Resigned (disqualification risk)
R15	Lower Shing Mun	Ken Wong Ho-fung	Community Sha Tin	1 January 2020	8 October 2021	Disqualified (unpatriotic oath)
R16	Wan Shing	Cheung Hing-wa	Neo Democrats	1 January 2020	8 July 2021	Resigned (disqualification risk)
R17	Keng Hau	Ng Kam-hung	Community Sha Tin	1 January 2020	8 October 2021	Disqualified (unpatriotic oath)
R18	Tin Sum	Tsang Kit	Community Sha Tin	1 January 2020	15 July 2021	Resigned (disqualification risk)
R19	Chui Ka	Li Sai-hung	Ind. democrat	1 January 2020	10 July 2021	Resigned (disqualification risk)
R20	Tai Wai	Kudama Ng Ting-lam	Democratic	1 January 2020	8 October 2021	Disqualified (unpatriotic oath)
R21	Chung Tin	Wong Hok-lai	Community Sha Tin	1 January 2020	8 October 2021	Disqualified (unpatriotic oath)
R22	Sui Wo	Mak Tsz-kin	Civic	1 January 2020	11 July 2021	Resigned (disqualification risk)
R23	Fo Tan	Lui Kai-wing	Civic	1 January 2020	15 July 2021	Resigned (disqualification risk)
R24	Chun Ma	Felix Chow Hiu-laam	Democratic	1 January 2020	31 December 2023	
R25	Hoi Nam	Chan Pui-ming	Civic	1 January 2020	3 October 2021	Resigned (protest against oath-taking)
R26	Chung On	Yip Wing	Labour	1 January 2020	8 July 2021	Resigned (disqualification risk)
R27	Kam To	Hui Lap-san	Ind. democrat	1 January 2020	31 December 2023	
R28	Ma On Shan Town Centre	Chung Lai-him	Ind. democrat	1 January 2020	31 December 2023	
R29	Wu Kai Sha	Li Wing-shing	Community Sha Tin	1 January 2020	7 July 2021	Resigned (disqualification risk)
R30	Lee On	Chris Mak Yun-pui	Ind. democrat	1 January 2020	31 December 2023	
R31	Fu Lung	Tsang So-lai	Democratic	1 January 2020	9 July 2021	Resigned (disqualification risk)
R32	Kam Ying	Ting Tsz-yuen	Community Sha Tin	1 January 2020	1 June 2021	Resigned (dissent political change)
R33	Yiu On	Sin Cheuk-nam	Democratic	1 January 2020	31 December 2023	
R34	Heng On	Cheng Tsuk-man	Democratic	1 January 2020	8 October 2021	Disqualified (unpatriotic oath)
R35	Tai Shui Hang	Michael Yung Ming-chau	Civic	1 January 2020	12 July 2021	Resigned (disqualification risk)
R36	On Tai	Cheng Chung-hang	Ind. democrat	1 January 2020	31 December 2023	
R37	Yu Yan	Lo Yuet-chau	STCV	1 January 2020	8 July 2021	Resigned (disqualification risk)
R38	Di Yee	Lam Kong-kwan	DAB	1 January 2020	31 December 2023	
R39	Bik Woo	Luk Tsz-tung	Civic	1 January 2020	12 July 2021	Resigned (disqualification risk)
R40	Kwong Hong	Ricardo Liao Pak-hong	Ind. democrat	1 January 2020	9 July 2021	Resigned (disqualification risk)
R41	Kwong Yuen	Yeung Sze-kin	Ind. democrat	1 January 2020	8 July 2021	Resigned (disqualification risk)
Ex Officio	Sha Tin Rural Committee Chairman	Mok Kam-kwai	BPA	1 January 2020	31 December 2023	

==== Kwai Tsing ====
Code	Constituency	Name	Political affiliation	Term start	Term end	Notes
S01	Kwai Hing	Leung Chi-shing	NWSC	1 January 2020	31 December 2023	
S02	Kwai Luen	Ng Kim-sing	Democratic	1 January 2020	10 July 2021	Resigned (disqualification risk)
S03	Kwai Shing East Estate	Rayman Chow Wai-hung	Ind. democrat	1 January 2020	19 July 2021	Resigned (disqualification risk)
S04	Upper Tai Wo Hau	Hui Kei-cheung	Democratic	1 January 2020	10 July 2021	Resigned (disqualification risk)
S05	Lower Tai Wo Hau	Wong Bing-kuen	Democratic	1 January 2020	9 July 2021	Resigned (disqualification risk)
S06	Kwai Chung Estate South	Ivan Wong Yun-tat	Ind. democrat	1 January 2020	1 June 2021	Resigned (protest against oath-taking)
S07	Kwai Chung Estate North	Simon Leung Kam-wai	Ind. democrat	1 January 2020	12 November 2021	Disqualified (jailed)
S08	Shek Yam	Andrew Wan Siu-kin	Democratic	1 January 2020	11 May 2021	Resigned (remanded in custody)
S09	Tai Pak Tin West	Jody Kwok Fu-yung	DAB	1 January 2020	31 December 2023	
S10	Tai Pak Tin East	Muli Lau Kwai-mui	Democratic	1 January 2020	31 December 2023	
S11	On Yam	Leung Wing-kuen	Democratic	1 January 2020	10 July 2021	Resigned (disqualification risk)
S12	Shek Lei North	Lam Siu-fai	Democratic	1 January 2020	31 December 2023	
S13	Shek Lei South	Leung Kwok-wah	Democratic	1 January 2020	9 July 2021	Resigned (disqualification risk)
S14	Kwai Fong	Leung Yiu-chung	NWSC	1 January 2020	27 February 2021	Disqualified (jailed)
S15	Hing Fong	Tong Ho-man	Democratic	1 January 2020	21 October 2021	Disqualified (unpatriotic oath)
S16	Wah Lai	Sin Chung-kai	Democratic	1 January 2020	28 May 2021	Disqualified (jailed)
S17	Lai Wah	Steve Cheung Kwan-kiu	Civic	1 January 2020	8 July 2021	Resigned (disqualification risk)
S18	Cho Yiu	Choi Nga-man	Ind. democrat	1 January 2020	9 July 2021	Resigned (disqualification risk)
S19	Lai King	Wong Tin-yan	Ind. democrat	1 January 2020	8 July 2021	Resigned (disqualification risk)
S20	Kwai Shing West Estate	Ivy Leung Ching-shan	NWSC	1 January 2020	21 October 2021	Disqualified (unpatriotic oath)
S21	On Ho	Warren Tam Ka-chun	Ind. democrat	1 January 2020	12 July 2021	Resigned (disqualification risk)
S22	Wai Ying	Henry Sin Ho-fai	Ind. democrat	1 January 2020	9 July 2021	Resigned (disqualification risk)
S23	Tsing Yi Estate	Wong Pit-man	Tsing Yi People	1 January 2020	9 July 2021	Resigned (disqualification risk)
S24	Greenfield	Wong Chun-tat	Ind. democrat	1 January 2020	10 July 2021	Resigned (disqualification risk)
S25	Cheung Ching	Nicholas Hon Chun-yin	Democratic	1 January 2020	9 July 2021	Resigned (disqualification risk)
S26	Cheung On	Jonathan Tsui Hiu-kit	Roundtable	1 January 2020	31 December 2023	
S27	Shing Hong	Leung Kar-ming	DAB	1 January 2020	31 December 2023	
S28	Tsing Yi South	Daniel Kwok Tsz-kin	Ind. democrat	1 January 2020	31 December 2023	
S29	Cheung Hang	Lo Yuen-ting	DAB	1 January 2020	31 December 2023	
S30	Ching Fat	Lau Chi-kit	Democratic	1 January 2020	12 July 2021	Resigned (disqualification risk)
S31	Cheung On	Dennis Cheung Man-lung	Ind. democrat	1 January 2020	20 July 2021	Resigned (disqualification risk)
Ex Officio	Tsing Yi Rural Committee Chairman	Chan Chi-wing	Independent	1 January 2020	31 December 2023	

==== Islands ====
Code	Constituency	Name	Political affiliation	Term start	Term end	Notes
T01	Lantau	Randy Yu Hon-kwan	Independent	1 January 2020	31 December 2023	
T02	Mun Yat	Kwok Ping	Ind. democrat	1 January 2020	31 December 2023	
T03	Yat Tung Estate North	Fong Lung-fei	Ind. democrat	1 January 2020	31 December 2023	
T04	Tung Chung South	Sheep Wong Chun-yeung	Ind. democrat	1 January 2020	21 October 2021	Disqualified (unpatriotic oath)
T05	Tung Chung Central	Lee Ka-ho	Civic	1 January 2020	9 July 2021	Resigned (disqualification risk)
T06	Tung Chung North	Sammy Tsui Sang-hung	Democratic	1 January 2020	21 October 2021	Disqualified (unpatriotic oath)
T07	Discovery Bay	Amy Yung Wing-sheung	Civic	1 January 2020	10 July 2021	Resigned (disqualification risk)
T08	Peng Chau & Hei Ling Chau	Josephine Tsang Sau-ho	Independent	1 January 2020	1 May 2022	Died in office
T09	Lamma & Po Toi	Lau Shun-ting	DAB	1 January 2020	31 December 2023	
T10	Cheung Chau	Leung Kwok-ho	Ind. democrat	1 January 2020	11 July 2021	Resigned (disqualification risk)
Ex Officio	Peng Chau Rural Committee Chairman	Wong Hon-kuen	Independent	1 January 2020	31 December 2023	
Ex Officio	Lamma North Rural Committee Chairman	Chan Lin-wai	Independent	1 January 2020	31 December 2023	
Ex Officio	Tung Chung Rural Committee Chairman	Wong Chau-ping	Independent	1 January 2020	31 December 2023	
Ex Officio	Lamma South Rural Committee Chairman	Chow Yuk-tong	Independent	1 January 2020	31 December 2023	
Ex Officio	Tai O Rural Committee Chairman	Ho Siu-kei	Independent	1 January 2020	31 December 2023	
Ex Officio	Lantau South Rural Committee Chairman	Ho Chun-fai	Independent	1 January 2020	31 December 2023	
Ex Officio	Mui Wo Rural Committee Chairman	Wong Man-hon	Independent	1 January 2020	31 December 2023	
Ex Officio	Cheung Chau Rural Committee Chairman	Yung Chi-ming	Independent	1 January 2020	31 December 2023	

== See also ==
- 6th Legislative Council of Hong Kong
