= Sau Mau Ping Central (constituency) =

Hong Kong constituency

- Elected constituency for the Kwun Tong District Council
- Boundary of Sau Mau Ping Central in Kwun Tong District
- District: Kwun Tong
- Legislative Council constituency: Kowloon East
- Population: 19,749 (2019)
- Electorate: 11,430 (2019)

Current constituency
- Created: 2015
- Number of members: One
- Member: Cheung Pui-kong (DAB)
- Created from: Sau Mau Ping North, Sau Mau Ping South

Sau Mau Ping Central (Chinese: 秀茂坪中) is one of the 37 constituencies in the Kwun Tong District of Hong Kong which was created in 2015.

The constituency loosely covers part of Sau Mau Ping Estate with the estimated population of 19,749.

== Councillors represented ==
Election	Member	Party
2015	Cheung Pui-kong	DAB

== Election results ==
=== 2010s ===
Kwun Tong District Council Election, 2019: Sau Mau Ping Central
Party	Candidate	Votes	%	±%
DAB	Cheung Pui-kong	4,176	51.89	
Nonpartisan	Danny So Wai-yeung	3,872	48.11	
Majority		304	3.78	
Turnout		8,077	70.74	
DAB hold		Swing		

Kwun Tong District Council Election, 2015: Sau Mau Ping Central
Party	Candidate	Votes	%	±%
DAB	Cheung Pui-kong	Uncontested		
DAB win (new seat)				
