= Peninsular Commons =

Peninsular Commons 半島連線
- Convenor: Frankie Fung
- Founded: 1 April 2020
- Ideology: Hong Kong localism Liberalism (Hong Kong)
- Regional affiliation: Pro-democracy camp
- Colours: Navy
- Legislative Council: 0 / 90
- Kowloon City District Council: 0 / 20

Website
- Official Facebook page

Peninsular Commons (Chinese: 半島連線) is a local political group based in Kowloon City founded in April 2020 by a group of young activists. It currently holds two seats in the Kowloon City District Council, Lee Hin-long who is also a Synergy Kowloon member and Tony Kwok Tin-lap of the Democratic Party.

== History ==
In the pro-democracy primaries for the 2020 Legislative Council election, Peninsular Commons convenor Frankie Fung Tat-chun and Kowloon City District Councillor Lee Hin-long ran in a ticket in Kowloon West. The ticket came fifth and failed to secure the nomination for the general election.

== Representatives ==
=== District Councils ===
District	Constituency	Member
Kowloon City	To Kwa Wan South	Lee Hin-long
Kowloon City	Hok Yuen Laguna Verde	Tony Kwok Tin-lap
