= Chun Cheung (constituency) =

Constituency in Kwun Tong District, Hong Kong

- Elected constituency for the Kwun Tong District Council
- Boundary of Chun Cheung in Kwun Tong District
- District: Kwun Tong
- Legislative Council constituency: Kowloon East
- Population: 17,214 (2019)
- Electorate: 9,514 (2019)

Current constituency
- Created: 2019
- Number of members: One
- Member: Tse Suk-chun (Nonpartisan)
- Created from: Chui Cheung, Yau Tong East

Chun Cheung (Chinese: 俊翔) is one of the 40 constituencies in the Kwun Tong District.

Created for the 2019 District Council elections, the constituency returns one district councillor to the Kwun Tong District Council, with an election every four years.

Chun Cheung loosely covers part of the residential estates Ko Cheung Court and Ko Chun Court in Yau Tong. It has projected population of 17,214.

== Councillors represented ==
Election	Member	Party
2019	Tse Suk-chun	Nonpartisan

== Election results ==
=== 2010s ===
Kwun Tong District Council Election, 2019: Chun Cheung
Party	Candidate	Votes	%	±%
Nonpartisan	Tse Suk-chun	4,480	62.21	
FTU	Wong Kai-san	2,721	37.79	
Majority		1,759	24.42	
Turnout		7,214	75.84	
Nonpartisan win (new seat)				
