= Jordan North (constituency) =

- Elected constituency for the Yau Tsim Mong District Council
- Boundary of Jordan North in Yau Tsim Mong District
- District: Yau Tsim Mong
- Legislative Council constituency: Kowloon West
- Population: 17,885 (2019)
- Electorate: 4,249 (2019)

Current constituency
- Created: 2015
- Number of members: One
- Member: Frank Ho Fu-wing (Independent)
- Created from: Jordan West; King's Park; Yau Ma Tei

Jordan North (Chinese: 佐敦北) is one of the 19 constituencies in the Yau Tsim Mong District of Hong Kong which was created in 2015.

The constituency loosely covers Jordan Road with the estimated population of 13,558.

== Councillors represented ==
Election	Member	Party
2015	Craig Jo Chun-wah	DAB
2019	Frank Ho Fu-wing	Independent

== Election results ==
=== 2010s ===
Yau Tsim Mong District Council Election, 2019: Jordan North
Party	Candidate	Votes	%	±%
Independent	Frank Ho Fu-wing	1,423	56.02	
DAB	Craig Jo Chun-wah	1,117	43.98	−26.92
Majority		306	12.04	
Turnout		2,547	60.00	
Independent gain from DAB		Swing		

Yau Tsim Mong District Council Election, 2015: Jordan North
Party	Candidate	Votes	%	±%
DAB	Craig Jo Chun-wah	941	70.9	
Nonpartisan	Chick Chi-leung	386	29.1	
Majority		555	41.8	
Turnout		1,344	34.9	
DAB win (new seat)				
