= Kowloon Station (constituency) =

- 九龍站
- Elected constituency for the Yau Tsim Mong District Council
- Boundary of Kowloon Station in Yau Tsim Mong District
- District: Yau Tsim Mong
- Legislative Council constituency: Kowloon West
- Population: 17,591 (2019)
- Electorate: 5,049 (2019)

Current constituency
- Created: 2019
- Number of members: One
- Member: Derek Hung Chiu-wah (DAB)
- Created from: Tsim Sha Tsui West

Kowloon Station (Chinese: 九龍站) is one of the 20 constituencies in the Yau Tsim Mong District.

Created for the 2019 District Council elections, the constituency returns one district councillor to the Yau Tsim Mong District Council, with an election every four years.

Kowloon Station loosely covers the private flats surrounding the Kowloon MTR station, including Sorrento, The Arch, The Cullinan, The Harbourside and The Waterfront. It has projected population of 17,591.

== Councillors represented ==
Election	Member	Party
2019	Derek Hung Chiu-wah	DAB

== Election results ==
=== 2010s ===
Yau Tsim Mong District Council Election, 2019: Kowloon Station
Party	Candidate	Votes	%	±%
DAB	Derek Hung Chiu-wah	1,928	50.33	
Independent Democrat	Cindy Li Wing-yin	1,821	47.53	
Nonpartisan	Yung Hei-chi	82	2.14	
Majority		107	2.80	
Turnout		3,839	76.03	
DAB win (new seat)				
