= On Tat (constituency) =

Hong Kong constituency

- 安達
- Elected constituency for the Kwun Tong District Council
- Boundary of On Tat in Kwun Tong District
- District: Kwun Tong
- Legislative Council constituency: Kowloon East
- Population: 19,618 (2019)
- Electorate: 8,538 (2019)

Current constituency
- Created: 2019
- Number of members: One
- Member: Hsu Yau-wai (DAB)
- Created from: Po Tat

On Tat (Chinese: 安達) is one of the 40 constituencies in the Kwun Tong District.

Created for the 2019 District Council elections, the constituency returns one district councillor to the Kwun Tong District Council, with an election every four years.

On Tat loosely covers part of the public housing estate On Tat Estate in Sau Mau Ping. It has projected population of 19,618.

== Councillors represented ==
Election	Member	Party
2019	Hsu Yau-wai	DAB

== Election results ==
=== 2010s ===
Kwun Tong District Council Election, 2019: On Tat
Party	Candidate	Votes	%	±%
DAB	Hsu Yau-wai	3,499	58.58	
PfD	Jason Siu Ho-yin	2,393	40.06	
Nonpartisan	Lau Pak-yuen	43	0.72	
Nonpartisan	Lee Seng-chang	38	0.64	
Majority		1,106	18.52	
Turnout		5,992	70.25	
DAB win (new seat)				
