= Pik Wui (constituency) =

- 碧匯
- Elected constituency for the Sham Shui Po District Council
- Boundary of Pik Wui in Sham Shui Po District
- District: Sham Shui Po
- Legislative Council constituency: Kowloon West
- Population: 13,376 (2019)
- Electorate: 3,495 (2019)

Current constituency
- Created: 2019
- Number of members: One
- Member: Vacant
- Created from: Fu Cheong, Fortune, Lai Chi Kok South

Pik Wui (Chinese: 碧匯) is one of the 25 constituencies in the Sham Shui Po District.

Created for the 2019 District Council elections, the constituency returns one district councillor to the Sham Shui Po District Council, with an election every four years.

Pik Wui loosely covers the residential flats such as Aqua Marine surrounding the Nam Cheong MTR station. It has projected population of 13,376.

== Councillors represented ==
Election	Member	Party
2019	Zoe Chow Wing-heng→Vacant	Democratic

== Election results ==
=== 2010s ===
Sham Shui Po District Council Election, 2019: Pik Wui
Party	Candidate	Votes	%	±%
Democratic	Zoe Chow Wing-heng	1,462	53.51	
BPA	Ray Wong Wing-wai	1,150	42.09	
Nonpartisan	Ma Yu-sang	120	4.39	
Majority		312	1.42	
Turnout		2,740	78.42	
Democratic win (new seat)				
