= Oi Chun (constituency) =

- 愛俊
- Elected constituency for the Kowloon City District Council
- Boundary of Oi Chun in Kowloon City District
- District: Kowloon City
- Legislative Council constituency: Kowloon Central
- Population: 13,113 (2019)
- Electorate: 9,551 (2019)

Current constituency
- Created: 1994
- Number of members: One
- Member: Cho Wui-hung (BPA/KWND)

Oi Chun (Chinese: 愛俊) is one of the 25 constituencies in the Kowloon City District of Hong Kong which was created in 1994.

The constituency has an estimated population of 13,113.

== Councillors represented ==
Election	Member	Party
1994	Chiang Sai-cheong	Democratic
199?	Chiang Sai-cheong	Liberal
2007	Cho Wui-hung	Independent
2016	Cho Wui-hung	BPA/KWND

== Election results ==
=== 2010s ===
Kowloon City District Council Election, 2019: Ma Hang Chung
Party	Candidate	Votes	%	±%
BPA	Cho Wui-hung	3,268	46.96	
Democratic	Chan Lai-kwan	3,237	46.52	
Independent	Leung Ka-lee	454	6.52	
Majority		31	0.44	
Turnout		6,978	73.12	
BPA hold		Swing		
