= Lantau (constituency) =

Electoral constituencies in the Islands District, Hong Kong

- Elected constituency for the Islands District Council
- Boundary of Lantau in Islands District
- District: Islands
- Legislative Council constituency: Hong Kong Island West
- Population: 24,685 (2019)
- Electorate: 8,336 (2019)

Current constituency
- Created: 1994
- Number of members: One
- Member: Randy Yu Hon-kwan (Independent)

Lantau (Chinese: 大嶼山) is one of the 10 constituencies in the Islands District in Hong Kong. It covers the largest part of Lantau Island and nearby outlying islands apart from other constituencies in Tung Chung and Discovery Bay.

The constituency returns one district councillor to the Islands District Council, with an election every four years.

Lantau constituency has an estimated population of 24,685.

== Councillors represented ==
| Election | Member | Party |
|---|---|---|
| 1994 | Chau Chuen-heung | DAB |
| 1999 | Wendy Chui Pui-man | Nonpartisan |
| 2003 | Wong Fuk-kan | Nonpartisan |
| 2015 | Randy Yu Hon-kwan | Nonpartisan |

== Election results ==
=== 2010s ===
Islands District Council Election, 2019: Lantau
| Party | Candidate | Votes | % | ±% |
|---|---|---|---|---|
| Nonpartisan | Randy Yu Hon-kwan | 2,873 | 51.98 | |
| PfD | Fung Siu-tin | 2,633 | 48.02 | |
| Nonpartisan | Ho Yan-ching | 21 | 0.38 | |
| Majority | | 240 | 3.96 | |
| Turnout | | 5,547 | 66.57 | |
| Nonpartisan hold | | Swing | | |
