= Lung Tsui (constituency) =

- 龍趣
- Elected constituency for the Wong Tai Sin District Council
- Boundary of Lung Tsui in Wong Tai Sin District
- District: Wong Tai Sin
- Legislative Council constituency: Kowloon Central
- Population: 16,351 (2019)
- Electorate: 8,294 (2019)

Current constituency
- Created: 1999
- Number of members: One
- Member: (Vacant)

Lung Tsui
- Traditional Chinese: 龍趣
Transcriptions
Yue: Cantonese
- Yale Romanization: Lùhng cheui
- Jyutping: Lung4 coei3

Lung Tsui is one of the 25 constituencies in the Wong Tai Sin District in Hong Kong. The constituency returns one district councillor to the Wong Tai Sin District Council, with an election every four years.

The constituency is loosely based on Lions Rise, part of Lower Wong Tai Sin (II) Estate and Wong Tai Sin Disciplined Services Quarters with an estimated population of 16,351.

== Councillors represented ==
Election	Member	Party
1999	Wong Kam-chi	Independent
2015	Lee Tung-kong	Independent
2019	Chong Ting-wai→Vacant	Independent democrat

== Election results ==
=== 2010s ===
Wong Tai Sin District Council Election, 2019: Lung Tsui
Party	Candidate	Votes	%	±%
PfD	Chong Ting-wai	2,911	52.34	
Independent	Lee Tung-kong	2,651	47.66	
Majority		260	4.68	
Turnout		5,583	67.32	
PfD gain from Independent		Swing		
