= Chun Ma (constituency) =

Constituency in Sha Tin District, Hong Kong

- Elected constituency for the Sha Tin District Council
- Boundary of Chun Ma in Sha Tin District
- District: Sha Tin
- Legislative Council constituency: New Territories North East
- Population: 13,863 (2019)
- Electorate: 6,940 (2019)

Current constituency
- Created: 1999
- Number of members: One
- Member: Felix Chow Hiu-laam (Democratic)

Chun Ma
- Traditional Chinese: 駿馬
Transcriptions
Yue: Cantonese
- Yale Romanization: Jeun máh
- Jyutping: Zeon3 ma5

Chun Ma is one of the 41 constituencies of the Sha Tin District Council. The seat elects one member of the council every four years. The constituency has an estimated population of 13,863.

== Councillors represented ==
Election	Member	Party
1999	Cheung Shui-fung	DAB
2003	Siu Hin-hong	Independent
2019	Felix Chow Hiu-laam	Democratic

== Election results ==
=== 2010s ===
Sha Tin District Council Election, 2019: Chun Ma
Party	Candidate	Votes	%	±%
Democratic (PfD)	Felix Chow Hiu-laam	2,611	50.43	
Nonpartisan	Siu Hin-hong	1,355	26.17	
Liberal	Ho Wai-lok	1,211	23.39	
Majority		1,256	24.26	
Turnout		5,190	74.78	
Democratic gain from Nonpartisan		Swing		
