= Yau Tong West (constituency) =

Hong Kong constituency

- 油塘西
- Elected constituency for the Kwun Tong District Council
- Boundary of Yau Tong West in Kwun Tong District
- District: Kwun Tong
- Legislative Council constituency: Kowloon East
- Population: 19,627 (2019)
- Electorate: 10,929 (2019)

Current constituency
- Created: 2003
- Number of members: One
- Member: Lui Tung-hai (Independent)

Yau Tong West
- Traditional Chinese: 油塘西
Transcriptions
Yue: Cantonese
- Yale Romanization: Yàuh tòhng sāi
- Jyutping: Jau4 tong4 sai1

Yau Tong West is one of the 37 constituencies in the Kwun Tong District of Hong Kong which was created in 2003.

The constituency has an estimated population of 19,627.

== Councillors represented ==
Election	Member	Party
2003	Lui Tung-hai	Independent

== Election results ==
=== 2010s ===
Kwun Tong District Council Election, 2019: Yau Tong West
Party	Candidate	Votes	%	±%
Independent	Lui Tung-hai	3,853	52.11	
Ind. democrat	Michael Wong Siu-nam	3,541	47.89	
Majority		312	4.22	
Turnout		7,435	68.09	
Independent hold		Swing		
