= Ching Fat (constituency) =

Hong Kong constituency

- Elected constituency for the Kwai Tsing District Council
- Boundary of Ching Fat in Kwai Tsing District
- District: Kwai Tsing
- Legislative Council constituency: New Territories South West
- Population: 17,863 (2019)
- Electorate: 12,451 (2019)

Current constituency
- Created: 1994
- Number of members: One
- Member: vacant

Ching Fat (Chinese: 青發) is one of the 31 constituencies of the Kwai Tsing District Council in Hong Kong. The seat elects one member of the council every four years. It was first created in the 1994 elections. Its boundary is loosely based on part of Cheung Fat Estate, Ching Nga Court, Ching Tai Court and Ching Wang Court in Tsing Yi with estimated population of 17,863.

== Councillors represented ==
Election	Member	Party
1994	Wong Cheong-shing	Nonpartisan
1999	Nancy Poon Siu-ping	Nonpartisan
2015	Nancy Lam Chui-ling	Nonpartisan
2019	Lau Chi-kit→vacant	Democratic

== Election results ==
=== 2010s ===
Kwai Tsing District Council Election, 2019: Ching Fat
Party	Candidate	Votes	%	±%
Democratic	Lau Chi-kit	5,061	56.55	
Independent	Nancy Lam Chui-ling	3,468	35.75	
Nonpartisan	Wong Pui-shan	271	3.03	
Independent	Chau Hon-sum	120	1.34	
Nonpartisan	Ho Wing-chi	29	0.32	
Majority		1,593	20.80	
Turnout		8,977	72.17	
Democratic gain from Independent		Swing		
