= Tai Kok Tsui North (constituency) =

- Elected constituency for the Yau Tsim Mong District Council
- Boundary of Tai Kok Tsui North in Yau Tsim Mong District
- District: Yau Tsim Mong
- Legislative Council constituency: Kowloon West
- Population: 20,538 (2019)
- Electorate: 8,495 (2019)

Current constituency
- Created: 2007
- Number of members: One
- Member: vacant

Tai Kok Tsui North (Chinese: 大角咀北) is one of the 20 constituencies in the Yau Tsim Mong District. The constituency returns one district councillor to the Yau Tsim Mong District Council, with an election every four years.

== Councillors represented ==
Election	Member	Party
2007	Lau Pak-kei	DAB
2019	Owan Li→vacant	Nonpartisan

== Election results ==
=== 2010s ===
Yau Tsim Mong District Council Election, 2019: Tai Kok Tsui North
Party	Candidate	Votes	%	±%
Nonpartisan	Owan Li	3,301	52.16	
DAB	Lau Pak-kei	3,028	47.84	
Majority		273	4.32	
Turnout		6,362	74.94	
Nonpartisan gain from DAB		Swing		
