= Hung Hom (constituency) =

- Elected constituency for the Kowloon City District Council
- Boundary of Hung Hom in Kowloon City District
- District: Kowloon City
- Legislative Council constituency: Kowloon Central
- Population: 13,762 (2019)
- Electorate: 4,977 (2019)

Current constituency
- Created: 1994
- Number of members: One
- Member: Lam Tak-shing (DAB)

Hung Hom (Chinese: 紅磡) is one of the 24 constituencies in the Kowloon City District of Hong Kong which was created in 1994.

The constituency has an estimated population of 13,762.

== Councillors represented ==
Election	Member	Party
1994	Ip Che-kin	DAB
2007	Pius Yam Kwok-tung	ADPL
2015	Lam Tak-shing	DAB

== Election results ==
=== 2010s ===
Kowloon City District Council Election, 2019: Hung Hom
Party	Candidate	Votes	%	±%
DAB	Lam Tak-shing	1,779	53.86	
Nonpartisan	Kwan Siu-lun	1,524	46.14	
Majority		255	7.72	
Turnout		3,317	66.69	
DAB hold		Swing		
