= Lei Muk Shue West (constituency) =

- Elected constituency for the Tsuen Wan District Council
- Boundary of Lei Muk Shue West in Tsuen Wan District
- District: Tsuen Wan
- Legislative Council constituency: New Territories South West
- Population: 17,296 (2019)
- Electorate: 9,519 (2019)

Current constituency
- Created: 1999
- Number of members: One
- Member: Wong Ka-wa (Independent)

Lei Muk Shue West (Chinese: 梨木樹西) is one of the 19 constituencies in the Tsuen Wan District. It covers the west part of Lei Muk Shue Estate.

The constituency returns one district councillor to the Tsuen Wan District Council, with an election every four years.

Lei Muk Shue West constituency has estimated population of 17,296.

== Councillors represented ==
Election	Member	Party
1999	Lam Chiu-lun	Independent
2003	Wong Ka-wa	Independent
2007	Wong Ka-wa	Civic
2021	Wong Ka-wa	Independent

== Election results ==
=== 2010s ===
Tsuen Wan District Council Election, 2019: Lei Muk Shue West
Party	Candidate	Votes	%	±%
Civic	Wong Ka-wa	4,129	66.20	
FPHE	Fung Cheuk-sum	2,108	33.80	
Majority		2,021	32.40	
Turnout		6,265	65.86	
Civic hold		Swing		
