= Yan Lam (constituency) =

Hong Kong constituency

- 欣藍
- Elected constituency for the Eastern District Council
- Boundary of Yan Lam in Eastern District
- District: Eastern
- Legislative Council constituency: Hong Kong Island East
- Population: 16,073 (2019)
- Electorate: 9,990 (2019)

Current constituency
- Created: 2003
- Number of members: One
- Member: Vacant

Yan Lam (Chinese: 欣藍), formerly called Yan Yee, is one of the 35 constituencies in the Eastern District.

The constituency returns one district councillor to the Eastern District Council, with an election every four years. The seat is currently held by Wong Kin-hing.

Yan Lam has estimated population of 16,073.

== Councillors represented ==
Election	Member	Party	%
2003	Chu Wai-joe	Democratic	51.27
2007	Albert Wong Kin-hing	Independent	66.55
2011	Albert Wong Kin-hing	Independent	87.69
2015	Albert Wong Kin-hing	Independent	N/A
2019	Alice Ishigami Lee Fung-king→Vacant (Note: Resigned on 10 July 2021.)	Independent democrat	52.18

== Election results ==
=== 2010s ===
Eastern District Council Election, 2019: Yan Lam
Party	Candidate	Votes	%	±%
PfD	Alice Ishigami Lee Fung-king	3,982	52.18	
Nonpartisan	Wong Kin-hing	3,543	46.43	
Nonpartisan	Windy Tan Yi-chun	106	1.39	
Majority		349	5.75	
Turnout		7,642	76.50	
PfD gain from Nonpartisan		Swing		

Eastern District Council Election, 2015: Yan Lam
Party	Candidate	Votes	%	±%
Independent	Albert Wong Kin-hing	Uncontested		
Independent hold		Swing		

Eastern District Council Election, 2011: Yan Lam
Party	Candidate	Votes	%	±%
Independent	Albert Wong Kin-hing	3,620	87.69	+21.14
Democratic	Cupid Leung Chun-kin	508	12.31	−21.14
Majority		612	75.38	
Turnout		4,128	47.59	
Independent hold		Swing	+21.14	

=== 2000s ===
Eastern District Council Election, 2007: Yan Lam
Party	Candidate	Votes	%	±%
Independent	Albert Wong Kin-hing	2,489	66.55	
Democratic	Chu Wai-joe	1,251	33.45	−17.82
Majority		1,238	33.10	
Independent gain from Democratic		Swing		

Eastern District Council Election, 2003: Yan Lam
Party	Candidate	Votes	%	±%
Democratic	Chu Wai-joe	1,519	51.27	
Independent	Mak Wai-chee	996	33.61	
Justice Union	Tsang Hong-sang	448	15.12	
Majority		523	17.66	
Democratic win (new seat)				
