= Lai Ching (constituency) =

Hong Kong electoral district

- Elected constituency for the Kwun Tong District Council
- Boundary of Lai Ching in Kwun Tong District
- District: Kwun Tong
- Legislative Council constituency: Kowloon East
- Population: 15,349 (2019)
- Electorate: 10,598 (2019)

Current constituency
- Created: 1994
- Number of members: One
- Member: Vacant

Lai Ching
- Traditional Chinese: 麗晶
Transcriptions
Yue: Cantonese
- Yale Romanization: Laih jīng
- Jyutping: Lai6 zing1

Lai Ching is one of the 37 constituencies in the Kwun Tong District of Hong Kong which was created in 1991.

The constituency has an estimated population of 15,349.

== Councillors represented ==
Election	Member	Party
1994	Ngan Shek-chuen	Independent
1999	Poon Chun-yuen	Independent
200?	Poon Chun-yuen	DAB
2015	Sheik Anthony Bux→Vacant	Civic

== Election results ==
=== 2010s ===
Kwun Tong District Council Election, 2019: Lai Ching
Party	Candidate	Votes	%	±%
Civic	Sheik Anthony Bux	5,364	68.26	
Nonpartisan	Sammi Chan Sin-ting	2,494	31.74	
Majority		2,870	36.52	
Turnout		7,881	74.37	
Civic hold		Swing		
