= Hong Lok (constituency) =

Hong Kong constituency

- Elected constituency for the Kwun Tong District Council
- Boundary of Hong Lok in Kwun Tong District
- District: Kwun Tong
- Legislative Council constituency: Kowloon East
- Population: 15,614 (2019)
- Electorate: 7,945 (2019)

Current constituency
- Created: 1994
- Number of members: One
- Member: Chris Chan Ka-yin (Independent)

Hong Lok
- Traditional Chinese: 康樂
- Simplified Chinese: 康乐
Transcriptions
Standard Mandarin
- Hanyu Pinyin: Kānglè
Yue: Cantonese
- Yale Romanization: Hōng lohk
- Jyutping: Hong1 lok6

Hong Lok is one of the 40 constituencies in the Kwun Tong District of Hong Kong which was created in 1994.

The constituency has an estimated population of 15,614.

== Councillors represented ==
Election	Member	Party
1994	Cheung Shu-fun	KTRA
1999	Tsui Wing-chuen	Democratic
200?	Tsui Wing-chuen	Independent
2007	Ma Yat-chiu	Independent
2019	Chris Chan Ka-yin	Independent

== Election results ==
=== 2010s ===
Kwun Tong District Council Election, 2019: Hong Lok
Party	Candidate	Votes	%	±%
Nonpartisan	Chris Chan Ka-yin	3,231	57.80	
Nonpartisan	Ma Yat-chiu	2,359	42.20	
Majority		872	15.60	
Turnout		5,614	70.68	
Nonpartisan gain from Nonpartisan		Swing		
