= Kowloon Bay (constituency) =

Hong Kong constituency

- 九龍灣
- Elected constituency for the Kwun Tong District Council
- Boundary of Kowloon Bay in Kwun Tong District
- District: Kwun Tong
- Legislative Council constituency: Kowloon East
- Population: 13,289 (2019)
- Electorate: 7,434 (2019)

Current constituency
- Created: 1994
- Number of members: One
- Member: Winnie Poon Yam Wai-chun (Independent)

Kowloon Bay
- Traditional Chinese: 九龍灣
Transcriptions
Yue: Cantonese
- Yale Romanization: Gáu lùhng wāan
- Jyutping: Gau2 lung4 waan1

Kowloon Bay is one of the 37 constituencies in the Kwun Tong District of Hong Kong which was created in 1994.

The constituency has an estimated population of 13,289.

== Councillors represented ==
Election	Member	Party
1994	Winnie Poon Yam Wai-chun	Independent

== Election results ==
=== 2010s ===
Kwun Tong District Council Election, 2019: Kowloon Bay
Party	Candidate	Votes	%	±%
Nonpartisan	Winnie Poon Yam Wai-chun	3,454	65.21	
Nonpartisan	Lai Yu-hing	1,286	24.28	
Nonpartisan	Lai Chun-man	557	10.52	
Majority		2,168	40.93	
Turnout		5,345	71.91	
Nonpartisan hold		Swing		
