= Wo Che Estate (constituency) =

Hong Kong constituency

- 禾輋邨
- Elected constituency for the Sha Tin District Council
- Boundary of Wo Che Estate in Sha Tin District
- District: Sha Tin
- Legislative Council constituency: New Territories North East
- Population: 17,539 (2019)
- Electorate: 11,917 (2019)

Current constituency
- Created: 1994
- Number of members: One
- Member: Vacant

Wo Che Estate
- Traditional Chinese: 禾輋邨
Transcriptions
Yue: Cantonese
- Yale Romanization: Wòh chèh chyūn
- Jyutping: Wo4 ce4 cyun1

Wo Che Estate is one of the 36 constituencies of the Sha Tin District Council. The seat elects one member of the council every four years. The constituency has an estimated population of 17,539.

== Councillors represented ==
Election	Member	Party
1994	Lee York-fai	Nonpartisan
200?	Lee York-fai	Liberal
2007	Anna Yue Shin-man	DAB
2019	Raymond Li Chi-wang→Vacant	Independent democrat

== Election results ==
=== 2010s ===
Sha Tin District Council Election, 2019: Wo Che Estate
Party	Candidate	Votes	%	±%
Ind. democrat	Raymond Li Chi-wang	4,837	59.09	
DAB	Anna Yue Shin-man	3,175	38.79	
Nonpartisan	Lau Wai-lam	174	2.16	
Majority		1,662	20.30	
Turnout		8,219	68.99	
Ind. democrat gain from DAB		Swing		
