= Tai Kok Tsui South (constituency) =

- Elected constituency for the Yau Tsim Mong District Council
- Boundary of Tai Kok Tsui South in Yau Tsim Mong District
- District: Yau Tsim Mong
- Legislative Council constituency: Kowloon West
- Population: 14,341 (2019)
- Electorate: 6,622 (2019)

Current constituency
- Created: 2007
- Number of members: One
- Member: vacant

Tai Kok Tsui South (Chinese: 大角咀南) is one of the 20 constituencies in the Yau Tsim Mong District. The constituency returns one district councillor to the Yau Tsim Mong District Council, with an election every four years.

== Councillors represented ==
Election	Member	Party
2007	Benjamin Choi Siu-fung	DAB/FTU
2019	Tsang Tsz-ming→vacant	Democratic

== Election results ==
=== 2010s ===
Yau Tsim Mong District Council Election, 2019: Tai Kok Tsui South
Party	Candidate	Votes	%	±%
Democratic	Tsang Tsz-ming	2,632	56.00	
DAB	Benjamin Choi Siu-fung	2,068	44.00	
Majority		564	12.00	
Turnout		4,722	71.34	
Democratic gain from DAB		Swing		
