= Lok Wah South (constituency) =

Hong Kong constituency

- 樂華南
- Elected constituency for the Kwun Tong District Council
- Boundary of Lok Wah South in Kwun Tong District
- District: Kwun Tong
- Legislative Council constituency: Kowloon East
- Population: 12,582 (2019)
- Electorate: 7,962 (2019)

Current constituency
- Created: 1991
- Number of members: One
- Member: Kevin So Koon-chung (Independent)

Lok Wah South
- Traditional Chinese: 樂華南
Transcriptions
Yue: Cantonese
- Yale Romanization: Lohk wàah nàahm
- Jyutping: Lok6 waa4 naam4

Lok Wah South is one of the 37 constituencies in the Kwun Tong District of Hong Kong which was created in 1991.

The constituency loosely based on Hipway Towers, part of Lok Wah South Estate, Sau Mau Ping Disciplined Services Quarters and Wah Fung Gardens with an estimated population of 12,582.

== Councillors represented ==
Election	Member	Party
1991	Ma Yat-cheung	KTRA
199?	Ma Yat-cheung	Independent
1999	Law Lai-kuen	Independent
2003	Kevin So Koon-chung	Democratic
2006	Kevin So Koon-chung	Independent

== Election results ==
=== 2010s ===
Kwun Tong District Council Election, 2019: Lok Wah South
Party	Candidate	Votes	%	±%
Nonpartisan	Kevin So Koon-chung	2,856	50.73	
FTU	Lee Ka-hang	2,774	49.27	
Majority		82	1.46	
Turnout		5,664	71.16	
Nonpartisan hold		Swing		
