= Upper Ngau Tau Kok Estate (constituency) =

Hong Kong constituency

- Elected constituency for the Kwun Tong District Council
- Boundary of Upper Ngau Tau Kok Estate in Kwun Tong District
- District: Kwun Tong
- Legislative Council constituency: Kowloon East
- Population: 15,165 (2019)
- Electorate: 9,699 (2019)

Current constituency
- Created: 2015
- Number of members: One
- Member: Leung Tang-fung (DAB)
- Created from: Ngau Tau Kok

Upper Ngau Tau Kok Estate (Chinese: 牛頭角上邨) is one of the 37 constituencies in the Kwun Tong District of Hong Kong which was recreated in 2015.

The constituency loosely covers part of Upper Ngau Tau Kok Estate with the estimated population of 15,165.

== Councillors represented ==
Election	Member	Party
2015	Ben Chan Kwok-wah	DAB
2019	Leung Tang-fung	DAB

== Election results ==
=== 2010s ===
Kwun Tong District Council Election, 2019: Upper Ngau Tau Kok Estate
Party	Candidate	Votes	%	±%
DAB	Leung Tang-fung	3,247	51.21	−10.39
Nonpartisan	Cheng Chun-wah	3,093	48.79	
Majority		154	2.42	
Turnout		6,373	65.75	
DAB hold		Swing		

Kwun Tong District Council Election, 2015: Upper Ngau Tau Kok Estate
Party	Candidate	Votes	%	±%
DAB	Ben Chan Kwok-wah	2,453	61.6	
Nonpartisan	Hendrick Lui Chi-hang	1,531	38.4	
Majority		922	23.2	
Turnout		4,022	46.0	
DAB win (new seat)				
