= On Lee (constituency) =

Hong Kong constituency

- 安利
- Elected constituency for the Kwun Tong District Council
- Boundary of On Lee in Kwun Tong District
- District: Kwun Tong
- Legislative Council constituency: Kowloon East
- Population: 18,411 (2019)
- Electorate: 9,607 (2019)

Current constituency
- Created: 1994
- Number of members: One
- Member: Choy Chak-hung (Independent)

On Lee
- Traditional Chinese: 安利
Transcriptions
Yue: Cantonese
- Yale Romanization: Ōn leih
- Jyutping: On1 lei6

On Lee, previously called Lee On, is one of the 37 constituencies in the Kwun Tong District of Hong Kong which was created in 1991.

The constituency has an estimated population of 18,411.

== Councillors represented ==
Election	Member	Party
1994	Choy Chak-hung	CTU
199?	Choy Chak-hung	Independent

== Election results ==
=== 2010s ===
Kwun Tong District Council Election, 2019: On Lee
Party	Candidate	Votes	%	±%
Nonpartisan	Choy Chak-hung	3,687	57.69	
DAB	Tsang Wing-fai	2,704	42.31	
Majority		983	15.38	
Turnout		6,411	66.77	
Nonpartisan hold		Swing		
