= Wan Tau Tong (constituency) =

- Elected constituency for the Tai Po District Council
- Boundary of Wan Tau Tong in Tai Po District
- District: Tai Po
- Legislative Council constituency: New Territories North East
- Population: 15,438 (2019)
- Electorate: 12,377 (2019)

Current constituency
- Created: 1994
- Number of members: One
- Member: Vacant

Wan Tau Tong (Chinese: 運頭塘) is one of the 19 constituencies in the Tai Po District of Hong Kong.

The constituency returns one district councillor to the Tai Po District Council, with an election every four years.

Wan Tau Tong constituency has an estimated population of 17,657.

== Councillors represented ==
Election	Member	Party
1994	Edward Lee Chi-shing	Democratic
200?	Edward Lee Chi-shing	Independent democrat
2007	Ken Yu Chi-wing	Independent
2019	Wong Siu-kin→Vacant	Civic Passion

== Election results ==
=== 2010s ===
Tai Po District Council Election, 2019: Wan Tau Tong
Party	Candidate	Votes	%	±%
Civic Passion	Wong Siu-kin	5,541	60.60	
Independent	Ken Yu Chi-wing	3,603	39.40	
Majority		1,938	21.20	
Turnout		9,163	74.05	
Civic Passion gain from Independent		Swing		
