= Hing Tin (constituency) =

Hong Kong constituency

- Elected constituency for the Kwun Tong District Council
- Boundary of Hing Tin in Kwun Tong District
- District: Kwun Tong
- Legislative Council constituency: Kowloon East
- Population: 16,638 (2019)
- Electorate: 11,828 (2019)

Current constituency
- Created: 1994
- Number of members: One
- Member: Nelson Ip Tsz-kit (Democratic)

Hing Tin
- Traditional Chinese: 興田
Transcriptions
Yue: Cantonese
- Yale Romanization: Hīng tìhn
- Jyutping: Hing1 tin4

Hing Tin is one of the 37 constituencies in the Kwun Tong District of Hong Kong which was created in 1991.

The constituency has an estimated population of 16,638.

== Councillors represented ==
Election	Member	Party
1994	Wong Wah-shun	Independent
2007	Chan Man-kin	Democratic
2019	Nelson Ip Tsz-kit	Democratic

== Election results ==
=== 2010s ===
Kwun Tong District Council Election, 2019: Hing Tin
Party	Candidate	Votes	%	±%
Democratic	Nelson Ip Tsz-kit	4,751	58.17	
FTU (DAB)	Alan Yu Siu-lun	3,417	41.83	
Majority		1,334	16.34	
Turnout		8,196	69.32	
Democratic hold		Swing		
