= Tsui Chuk & Pang Ching (constituency) =

- 翠竹及鵬程
- Elected constituency for the Wong Tai Sin District Council
- Boundary of Tsui Chuk & Pang Ching in Wong Tai Sin District
- District: Wong Tai Sin
- Legislative Council constituency: Kowloon Central
- Population: 17,350 (2019)
- Electorate: 12,434 (2019)

Current constituency
- Created: 1994
- Number of members: One
- Member: (Vacant)

Tsui Chuk & Pang Ching
- Traditional Chinese: 翠竹及鵬程
Transcriptions
Yue: Cantonese
- Yale Romanization: Cheui jūk kahp pàahng chìhng
- Jyutping: Coei3 zuk1 kap6 paang4 cing4

Tsui Chuk & Pang Ching is one of the 25 constituencies in the Wong Tai Sin District in Hong Kong. The constituency returns one district councillor to the Wong Tai Sin District Council, with an election every four years.

The constituency has an estimated population of 17,350.

== Councillors represented ==
Election	Member	Party
1994	Lee Tak-hong	DAB
2003	So Shek-kin	Independent
2015	Leonard Chan Ying	Independent
2019	Yau Hon-pong→vacant	Independent

== Election results ==
=== 2010s ===
Wong Tai Sin District Council Election, 2019: Tsui Chuk & Pang Ching
Party	Candidate	Votes	%	±%
Independent	Yau Hon-pong	4,087	48.65	
Independent	Leonard Chan Ying	3,838	45.69	
Independent	Anthony Sham Hi-ming	476	5.67	
Majority		249	2.96	
Turnout		8,436	67.88	
Independent gain from Independent		Swing		
