= Aberdeen (Hong Kong constituency) =

Constituency in the Southern District, Hong Kong

- Elected constituency for the Southern District Council
- Boundary of Aberdeen in Southern District
- District: Southern
- Legislative Council constituency: Hong Kong Island West
- Population: 19,023 (2019)
- Electorate: 10,965 (2019)

Current constituency
- Created: 1999
- Number of members: One
- Member: Vacant

Aberdeen (Chinese: 香港仔) is one of the 17 constituencies in the Southern District, Hong Kong.

The constituency returns one district councillor to the Southern District Council, with an election every four years.

Aberdeen constituency has an estimated population of 19,630.

== Councillors represented ==
Election	Member	Party			
1999	Wong Man-kit	Liberal			
????	Wong Man-kit	Independent			
2007	Vincent Wong Ling-sun	Independent			
2015	Pauline Yam	Independent	2019	Angus Wong Yui-hei→Vacant (Note: Resigned on 9 July 2021.)	Independent democrat

== Election results ==
=== 2010s ===
Southern District Council Election, 2019: Aberdeen
Party	Candidate	Votes	%	±%
Ind. democrat	Angus Wong Yui-hei	5,001	62.11	
Independent	Pauline Yam	3,020	37.51	
Nonpartisan	Lee Kin-shing	31	0.38	
Majority		1,981	24.60	
Turnout		8,073	73.63	
Ind. democrat gain from Independent		Swing		
