= Wah Kwai (constituency) =

Constituency in the Southern District, Hong Kong

- Elected constituency for the Southern District Council
- Boundary of Wah Kwai in Southern District
- District: Southern
- Legislative Council constituency: Hong Kong Island West
- Population: 13,684 (2019)
- Electorate: 10,963 (2019)

Current constituency
- Created: 1999
- Number of members: One
- Member: Vacant

Wah Kwai (Chinese: 華貴) is one of the 17 constituencies in the Southern District, Hong Kong.

The constituency returns one district councillor to the Southern District Council, with an election every four years.

Wah Kwai constituency has an estimated population of 16,079.

== Councillors represented ==
Election	Member	Party
1999	Hung Tin-lei	Independent
2003	Yeung Siu-pik	Democratic
2007	Ada Mak Tse How-ling	DAB
2019	Ben Poon Ping-hong→Vacant (Note: Resigned on 9 July 2021.)	Democratic

== Election results ==
=== 2010s ===
Southern District Council Election, 2019: Wah Fu South
Party	Candidate	Votes	%	±%
Democratic	Ben Poon Ping-hong	4,540	59.34	
DAB	Ada Mak Tse How-ling	3,111	40.66	
Majority		1,492	18.68	
Turnout		7,677	70.05	
Democratic gain from DAB		Swing		
