= Lower Yiu Tung (constituency) =

Hong Kong constituency

- 下耀東
- Elected constituency for the Eastern District Council
- Boundary of Lower Yiu Tung in Eastern District
- District: Eastern
- Legislative Council constituency: Hong Kong Island East
- Population: 17,066 (2019)
- Electorate: 8,589 (2019)

Current constituency
- Created: 1999
- Number of members: One
- Member: Ho Wai-lun (Labour)

Lower Yiu Tung (Chinese: 下耀東) is one of the 35 constituencies in the Eastern District.

The constituency returns one district councillor to the Eastern District Council, with an election every four years. Lower Yiu Tung has estimated population of 17,066.

== Councillors represented ==
Election	Member	Party
1999	Hui Ka-hoo	DAB
2015	Dominic Wong Chi-chung	DAB
2019	Ho Wai-lun	Labour

== Election results ==
=== 2010s ===
Eastern District Council Election, 2019: Lower Yiu Tung
Party	Candidate	Votes	%	±%
Labour	Ho Wai-lun	3,771	60.55	
DAB	Dominic Wong Chi-chung	2,457	39.45	
Majority		1,314	21.10	
Turnout		6,250	72.78	
Labour gain from DAB		Swing		
