= Kwun Tong Central (constituency) =

Hong Kong constituency

- 觀塘中心
- Elected constituency for the Kwun Tong District Council
- Boundary of in Kwun Tong District
- District: Kwun Tong
- Legislative Council constituency: Kowloon East
- Population: 16,518 (2019)
- Electorate: 7,643 (2019)

Current constituency
- Created: 1994
- Number of members: One
- Member: (Vacant)

Kwun Tong Central
- Traditional Chinese: 觀塘中心
Transcriptions
Yue: Cantonese
- Yale Romanization: Gūn tòhng jūng sām
- Jyutping: Gun1 tong4 zung1 sam1

Kwun Tong Central is one of the 40 constituencies in the Kwun Tong District of Hong Kong. The constituency was created in 1994.

The constituency has an estimated population of 16,518.

== Councillors represented ==
Election	Member	Party
1994	Lam Kin-pui	Independent
1999	Nelson Chan Wah-yu	Independent
2019	Edith Leung Yik-ting	Democratic

== Election results ==
=== 2010s ===
Kwun Tong District Council Election, 2019: Kwun Tong Central
Party	Candidate	Votes	%	±%
Democratic	Edith Leung Yik-ting	2,863	56.05	
Nonpartisan	Nelson Chan Wah-yu	2,245	43.95	
Majority		618	12.20	
Turnout		5,127	67.13	
Democratic gain from Nonpartisan		Swing		
