= Lung Ha (constituency) =

- 龍下
- Elected constituency for the Wong Tai Sin District Council
- Boundary of Lung Ha in Wong Tai Sin District
- District: Wong Tai Sin
- Legislative Council constituency: Kowloon Central
- Population: 16,671 (2019)
- Electorate: 10,600 (2019)

Current constituency
- Created: 1999
- Number of members: One
- Member: (Vacant)

Lung Ha
- Traditional Chinese: 龍下
Transcriptions
Yue: Cantonese
- Yale Romanization: Lùhng háh
- Jyutping: Lung4 ha5

Lung Ha, previously called Lung Kai, is one of the 25 constituencies in the Wong Tai Sin District in Hong Kong. The constituency returns one district councillor to the Wong Tai Sin District Council, with an election every four years.

The constituency has an estimated population of 16,672.

== Councillors represented ==
Election	Member	Party
1999	Kwok Sau-ying→Vacant	Independent

== Election results ==
=== 2010s ===
Wong Tai Sin District Council Election, 2019: Lung Ha
Party	Candidate	Votes	%	±%
Independent	Kwok Sau-ying	4,394	66.72	
Nonpartisan	Chung Pok-man	2,192	33.28	
Majority		2,202	33.44	
Turnout		6,623	62.53	
Independent hold		Swing		
