= Po Lok (constituency) =

Hong Kong constituency

- 寶樂
- Elected constituency for the Kwun Tong District Council
- Boundary of Po Lok in Kwun Tong District
- District: Kwun Tong
- Legislative Council constituency: Kowloon East
- Population: 13,893 (2019)
- Electorate: 9,600 (2019)

Current constituency
- Created: 1999
- Number of members: One
- Member: vacant

Po Lok
- Traditional Chinese: 寶樂
Transcriptions
Yue: Cantonese
- Yale Romanization: Bóu lohk
- Jyutping: Bou2 lok6

Po Lok is one of the 37 constituencies in the Kwun Tong District of Hong Kong which was created in 1999.

The constituency has an estimated population of 13,893.

== Councillors represented ==
Election	Member	Party
1999	Lau Ting-on	Independent
2015	Cheng Keng-ieong	Democratic

== Election results ==
=== 2010s ===
Kwun Tong District Council Election, 2019: Po Lok
Party	Candidate	Votes	%	±%
Democratic	Cheng Keng-ieong	4,070	64.38	
FPHE	Rio Fung Wang-yui	2,252	35.62	
Majority		1,818	29.76	
Turnout		6,344	66.12	
Democratic hold		Swing		
