= Luk Yeung (constituency) =

Constituency in Tsuen Wan District, Hong Kong

- Elected constituency for the Tsuen Wan District Council
- Boundary of Luk Yeung in Tsuen Wan District
- District: Tsuen Wan
- Legislative Council constituency: New Territories South West
- Population: 13,352 (2019)
- Electorate: 8,665 (2019)

Current constituency
- Created: 1994
- Number of members: One
- Member: Vacant

Luk Yeung (Chinese: 綠楊) is one of the 19 constituencies in the Tsuen Wan District.

The constituency returns one district councillor to the Tsuen Wan District Council, with an election every four years.

Luk Yeung constituency has estimated population of 13,352.

== Councillors represented ==
Election	Member	Party
1994	Yip Yeung Fuk-lan	UFSP→Liberal Party
1999	Yip Yeung Fuk-lan	Liberal
2003	Lam Faat-kang	Independent
2007	Lam Faat-kang	Independent
2011	Lam Faat-kang	Independent
2015	Lam Faat-kang	Independent
2019	Roy Pun Long-chung→Vacant	Neo Democrats→Independent

== Election results ==
=== 2010s ===
Tsuen Wan District Council Election, 2019: Luk Yeung
Party	Candidate	Votes	%	±%
Neo Democrats	Roy Pun Long-chung	3,677	56.68	
Nonpartisan	Lam Faat-kang	2,810	43.32	
Majority		867	13.36	
Turnout		6,520	75.27	
Neo Democrats gain from Nonpartisan		Swing		
