= Sha Tin Town Centre (constituency) =

Hong Kong constituency

- 沙田市中心
- Elected constituency for the Sha Tin District Council
- Boundary of Sha Tin Town Centre in Sha Tin District
- District: Sha Tin
- Legislative Council constituency: New Territories North East
- Population: 18,825 (2019)
- Electorate: 10,345 (2019)

Current constituency
- Created: 1994
- Number of members: One
- Member: Wai Hing-cheung (Independent)

Sha Tin Town Centre
- Traditional Chinese: 沙田市中心
Transcriptions
Yue: Cantonese
- Yale Romanization: Sāa tìhn síh jūng sām
- Jyutping: Saa1 tin4 si5 zung1 sam1
- IPA: [sa˥.tʰin˩.si˩˧.tsʊŋ˥.sɐm˥]

Sha Tin Town Centre is one of the 41 constituencies of the Sha Tin District Council. The seat elects one member of the council every four years. The constituency has an estimated population of 18,825.

== Councillors represented ==
| Election | Member | Party |
|---|---|---|
| 1994 | Kong Wood-chiu | Liberal |
| 199? | Kong Wood-chiu | DAB |
| 2003 | Wai Hing-cheung | Democratic |
| 200?? | Wai Hing-cheung | Independent democrat |

== Election results ==
=== 2010s ===
Sha Tin District Council Election, 2019: Sha Tin Town Centre
| Party | Candidate | Votes | % | ±% |
|---|---|---|---|---|
| Democratic Coalition | Wai Hing-cheung | 4,960 | 67.98 | |
| Nonpartisan | Calvin Tang Siu-fung | 2,336 | 32.02 | |
| Majority | | 2,624 | 35.96 | |
| Turnout | | 7,371 | 71.25 | |
| Democratic Coalition hold | | Swing | | |
