= Cherry (constituency) =

- Elected constituency for the Yau Tsim Mong District Council
- Boundary of Cherry in Yau Tsim Mong District
- District: Yau Tsim Mong
- Legislative Council constituency: Kowloon West
- Population: 15,042 (2019)
- Electorate: 6,058 (2019)

Current constituency
- Created: 1994
- Number of members: One
- Member: Chung Chak-fai (Independent)

Cherry (Chinese: 櫻桃) is one of the 20 constituencies in the Yau Tsim Mong District. The constituency returns one district councillor to the Yau Tsim Mong District Council, with an election every four years.

== Councillors represented ==
Election	Member	Party
1994	Chan Chung-kit	Independent
2003	Lam Ho-yeung	Democratic
2011	John Wong Chung	Independent
2015	Chung Chak-fai	Independent

== Election results ==
=== 2010s ===
Yau Tsim Mong District Council Election, 2019: Cherry
Party	Candidate	Votes	%	±%
Nonpartisan	Chung Chak-fai	2,310	53.42	
Civic	Gloria Ng Hiu-man	2,014	46.58	
Majority		296	6.84	
Turnout				
Nonpartisan hold		Swing		
