= Chuk Yuen South (constituency) =

Electoral constituency in Hong Kong

- Elected constituency for the Wong Tai Sin District Council
- Boundary of Chuk Yuen South in Wong Tai Sin District
- District: Wong Tai Sin
- Legislative Council constituency: Kowloon Central
- Population: 15,466 (2019)
- Electorate: 9,300 (2019)

Current constituency
- Created: 1991
- Number of members: One
- Member: (Vacant)

Chuk Yuen South
- Traditional Chinese: 竹園南
Transcriptions
Yue: Cantonese
- Yale Romanization: Jūk yùhn nàahm
- Jyutping: Zuk1 jyun4 naam4

Chuk Yuen South is one of the 25 constituencies in the Wong Tai Sin District in Hong Kong. The constituency returns one district councillor to the Wong Tai Sin District Council, with an election every four years.

The constituency has an estimated population of 15,103.

== Councillors represented ==
Election	Member	Party
1991	Ng Ngok-shing	Independent
1994	Hui Kam-shing→vacant	ADPL

== Election results ==
=== 2010s ===
Wong Tai Sin District Council Election, 2019: Chuk Yuen South
Party	Candidate	Votes	%	±%
ADPL	Hui Kam-shing	3,838	59.84	
FTU	Lee Kin-chung	2,576	40.16	
Majority		1,262	19.68	
Turnout		6,442	69.33	
ADPL hold		Swing		
