= Yau Lai (constituency) =

Constituency of Kwun Tong District, Hong Kong

- 油麗
- Elected constituency for the Kwun Tong District Council
- Boundary of Yau Lai in Kwun Tong District
- District: Kwun Tong
- Legislative Council constituency: Kowloon East
- Population: 16,068 (2019)
- Electorate: 8,129 (2019)

Current constituency
- Created: 2011
- Number of members: One
- Member: Wang Wai-lun (Independent)

Yau Lai
- Traditional Chinese: 油麗
Transcriptions
Yue: Cantonese
- Yale Romanization: Yàuh laih
- Jyutping: Jau4 lai6

Yau Lai is one of the 40 constituencies in the Kwun Tong District of Hong Kong which was created in 2011.

The constituency has an estimated population of 16,068.

== Councillors represented ==
Election	Member	Party
2011	Patrick Lai Shu-ho	Independent
2019	Wang Wai-lun	Independent

== Election results ==
=== 2010s ===
Kwun Tong District Council Election, 2019: Yau Lai
Party	Candidate	Votes	%	±%
Nonpartisan	Wang Wai-lun	3,070	54.82	
Independent	Patrick Lai Shu-ho	2,530	45.18	
Majority		540	9.64	
Turnout		5,614	69.12	
Nonpartisan gain from Independent		Swing		
