= Lam Tin (constituency) =

Hong Kong constituency

- 藍田
- Elected constituency for the Kwun Tong District Council
- Boundary of Lam Tin in Kwun Tong District
- District: Kwun Tong
- Legislative Council constituency: Kowloon East
- Population: 20,638 (2019)
- Electorate: 11,327 (2019)

Current constituency
- Created: 1994
- Number of members: One
- Member: Kan Ming-tung (FTU)

Lam Tin
- Traditional Chinese: 藍田
Transcriptions
Yue: Cantonese
- Yale Romanization: Làahm tìhn
- Jyutping: Laam4 tin4

Lam Tin is one of the 37 constituencies in the Kwun Tong District of Hong Kong which was created in 1991 (35 years ago).

The constituency has an estimated population of 20,638.

== Councillors represented ==
Election	Member	Party
1994	Ma Lai-king	KTRA
1999	Chan Tak-ming	DAB
2003	Yu Sau-chun	Independent
2007	Kan Ming-tung	FTU/DAB

== Election results ==
=== 2010s ===
Kwun Tong District Council Election, 2019: Lam Tin
Party	Candidate	Votes	%	±%
FTU	Kan Ming-tung	4,080	50.31	
Nonpartisan	Fung Tak-sum	4,030	49.69	
Majority		50	0.62	
Turnout		8,173	72.19	
FTU hold		Swing		
