= Lai Chi Kok North (constituency) =

Hong Kong constituency

- Elected constituency for the Sham Shui Po District Council
- Boundary of Lai Chi Kok North in Sham Shui Po District
- District: Sham Shui Po
- Legislative Council constituency: Kowloon West
- Population: 15,472 (2019)
- Electorate: 5,710 (2019)

Current constituency
- Created: 2007
- Number of members: One
- Member: Chum Tak-shing (ADPL)
- Created from: Lai Chi Kok

Lai Chi Kok North (Chinese: 荔枝角北) is one of the 25 constituencies in the Sham Shui Po District of Hong Kong which was created in 2007.

The constituency loosely covers northern part of Lai Chi Kok with the estimated population of 15,472.

== Councillors represented ==
Election	Member	Party
2007	Chong Chi-tat	Democratic
2011	Bruce Li Ki-fung	Nonpartisan
2015	Chum Tak-shing	ADPL

== Election results ==
=== 2010s ===
Sham Shui Po District Council Election, 2019: Lai Chi Kok North
Party	Candidate	Votes	%	±%
ADPL	Chum Tak-shing	2,738	66.62	+11.13
KWND	Gary Chau Chun-fai	1,372	33.38	
Majority		1,366	33.24	
Turnout		4,127	72.29	
ADPL hold		Swing		

Sham Shui Po District Council Election, 2015: Lai Chi Kok North
Party	Candidate	Votes	%	±%
ADPL	Chum Tak-shing	1,173	55.49	
Independent	Wu Sai-chuen	877	41.48	
Nonpartisan	Mui Yu	64	3.03	
Majority		296	14.01	
Turnout		2,114	47.92	
ADPL gain from Nonpartisan		Swing		

Sham Shui Po District Council Election, 2011: Lai Chi Kok North
Party	Candidate	Votes	%	±%
Nonpartisan	Bruce Li Ki-fung	1,312	42.55	
Democratic	Wong Leung-hi	985	31.72	−17.59
Nonpartisan	Leung Chiu-hung	334	10.76	
Independent	Lai Chi-leung	300	9.66	
People Power	Tam Sai-kit	174	5.60	
Majority		327	10.81	
Turnout		3,105	46.97	
Nonpartisan gain from Democratic		Swing		

=== 2000s ===
Sham Shui Po District Council Election, 2007: Lai Chi Kok North
Party	Candidate	Votes	%	±%
Democratic	Chong Chi-tat	1,484	69.31	
New Forum	Ronald Lau Wai-lun	657	30.69	
Majority		827	38.62	
Democratic win (new seat)				
