= Tin Keung (constituency) =

- 天強
- Elected constituency for the Wong Tai Sin District Council
- Boundary of Tin Keung in Wong Tai Sin District
- District: Wong Tai Sin
- Legislative Council constituency: Kowloon Central
- Population: 13,761 (2019)
- Electorate: 10,167 (2019)

Current constituency
- Created: 1999
- Number of members: One
- Member: (Vacant)

Tin Keung
- Traditional Chinese: 天強
Transcriptions
Yue: Cantonese
- Yale Romanization: Tīn kèuhng
- Jyutping: Tin1 koeng4

Tin Keung is one of the 25 constituencies in the Wong Tai Sin District in Hong Kong. The constituency returns one district councillor to the Wong Tai Sin District Council, with an election every four years.

The constituency has an estimated population of 13,761.

== Councillors represented ==
Election	Member	Party
1999	Chan On-tai	Democratic
????	Chan On-tai	Independent
200?	Chan On-tai	Liberal
2019	Jay Cheng Man-kit→vacant	Civic
2021	Jay Cheng Man-kit→vacant	Independent

== Election results ==
=== 2010s ===
Wong Tai Sin District Council Election, 2019: Tin Keung
Party	Candidate	Votes	%	±%
Civic	Jay Cheng Man-kit	4,608	59.98	
Liberal	Chan On-tai	3,075	40.02	
Majority		1,533	19.96	
Turnout		7,728	76.02	
Civic gain from Liberal		Swing		
