= Shek Yue (constituency) =

Constituency in the Southern District, Hong Kong

- Elected constituency for the Southern District Council
- Boundary of Shek Yue in Southern District
- District: Southern
- Legislative Council constituency: Hong Kong Island West
- Population: 15,692 (2019)
- Electorate: 11,850 (2019)

Current constituency
- Created: 2007
- Number of members: One
- Member: Vacant

Shek Yue (Chinese: 石漁) is one of the 17 constituencies in the Southern District, Hong Kong.

The constituency returns one district councillor to the Southern District Council, with an election every four years.

Shek Yue constituency has an estimated population of 15,692.

== Councillors represented ==
Election	Member	Party
2007	Ma Yuet-har	Independent
2011	Chu Lap-wai	DAB
2019	Chan Hin-chung→Vacant (Note: Resigned on 8 July 2021.)	Independent democrat

== Election results ==
=== 2010s ===
Southern District Council Election, 2019: Shek Yue
Party	Candidate	Votes	%	±%
Ind. democrat	Chan Hin-chung	4,263	56.21	
DAB	Chu Lap-wai	3,321	43.79	
Majority		942	12.42	
Turnout		7,606	64.23	
Ind. democrat gain from DAB		Swing		
