= Hoi Chun (constituency) =

Constituency of the Sai Kung District Council of Hong Kong

- Elected constituency for the Sai Kung District Council
- Boundary of Hoi Chun in Sai Kung District
- District: Sai Kung
- Legislative Council constituency: New Territories South East
- Population: 18,223 (2019)
- Electorate: 4,680 (2019)

Current constituency
- Created: 2019
- Number of members: One
- Member: vacant
- Created from: Po Yee

Hoi Chun (Chinese: 海晉) is one of the 29 constituencies in the Sai Kung District.

Created for the 2019 District Council elections, the constituency returns one district councillor to the Sai Kung District Council, with an election every four years.

Hoi Chun loosely covers residential area in southern Tseung Kwan O. It was named by the first Chinese words of The Papillons and The Wings respectively. It has projected population of 18,223.

== Councillors represented ==
Election	Member	Party
2019	Ivan Lai Wai-tong→Vacant	Neo Democrats→Independent

== Election results ==
=== 2010s ===
Sai Kung District Council Election, 2019: Hoi Chun
Party	Candidate	Votes	%	±%
Neo Democrats	Ivan Lai Wai-tong	2,099	53.27	
Independent	Kate Lam Lok-yee	1,350	34.26	
Ind. democrat	Chiu Chi-man	240	6.09	
Independent	Ho Kam-wing	234	5.94	
Nonpartisan	Lau Wai-cheuk	17	0.43	
Majority		749	19.01	
Turnout		3,944	84.27	
Neo Democrats win (new seat)				
