= Shing Fuk (constituency) =

- Elected constituency for the North District Council
- Boundary of Shing Fuk in North District
- District: North
- Legislative Council constituency: New Territories North
- Population: 14,726 (2019)
- Electorate: 10,435 (2019)

Current constituency
- Created: 1999
- Number of members: One
- Member: Warwick Wan Wo-tat (FTU)

Shing Fuk (Chinese: 盛福), formerly called Ka Fuk, is one of the 17 constituencies in the North District, Hong Kong.

The constituency returns one district councillor to the North District Council, with an election every four years.

Shing Fuk constituency has an estimated population of 14,726.

== Councillors represented ==
Election	Member	Party
1999	Sham Wing-kun	Democratic
2007	Warwick Wan Wo-tat	DAB
2012	Warwick Wan Wo-tat	FTU

== Election results ==
=== 2010s ===
North District Council Election, 2019: Shing Fuk
Party	Candidate	Votes	%	±%
FTU	Warwick Wan Wo-tat	3,181	41.90	
Nonpartisan	Hendrick Lui Chi-hang	2,656	34.99	
Neo Democrats	Wong Leung-hi	1,754	23.11	
Majority		525	6.91	
Turnout		7,606	72.92	
FTU hold		Swing		
