= Mount Parker (constituency) =

Constituency of the Eastern District Council of Hong Kong

- 柏架山
- Elected constituency for the Eastern District Council
- Boundary of Mount Parker in Eastern District
- District: Eastern
- Legislative Council constituency: Hong Kong Island East
- Population: 12,806 (2019)
- Electorate: 7,542 (2019)

Current constituency
- Created: 1994
- Number of members: One
- Member: Annie Lee Ching-har (DAB)

Mount Parker (Chinese: 柏架山) is one of the 35 constituencies in the Eastern District.

The constituency returns one district councillor to the Eastern District Council, with an election every four years. The seat is currently held by Annie Lee Ching-har.

Mount Parker has estimated population of 12,806.

== Councillors represented ==
Election	Member	Party	%
1994	Yuen Ki-kong	Public Affairs Society→Progressive Alliance	N/A
1999	Wong King-pan	DAB	48.97
2003	Wong King-pan	DAB	55.90
2007	Wong King-pan	DAB	81.70
2011	Wong King-pan	DAB	N/A
2015	Wong King-pan	DAB	N/A
2019	Annie Lee Ching-har	DAB	51.68

== Election results ==
=== 2010s ===
Eastern District Council Election, 2019: Mount Parker
Party	Candidate	Votes	%	±%
DAB	Annie Lee Ching-har	2,664	51.68	
Nonpartisan	Lai Yik-ming	2,491	48.32	
Majority		173	3.36	
Turnout		5,178	68.67	
DAB hold		Swing		

Eastern District Council Election, 2015: Mount Parker
Party	Candidate	Votes	%	±%
DAB	Wong Kin-pan	Uncontested		
DAB hold		Swing		

Eastern District Council Election, 2011: Mount Parker
Party	Candidate	Votes	%	±%
DAB	Wong Kin-pan	Uncontested		
DAB hold		Swing		

=== 2000s ===
Eastern District Council Election, 2007: Mount Parker
Party	Candidate	Votes	%	±%
DAB	Wong Kin-pan	2,120	81.70	+25.80
Independent Democrat	Alan Leung Koon-lun	475	18.30	
Majority		1,645	63.40	
DAB hold		Swing		

Eastern District Council Election, 2003: Mount Parker
Party	Candidate	Votes	%	±%
DAB	Wong Kin-pan	1,549	55.90	+6.93
Democratic	Chris Wong Shing-fai	1,222	44.10	+21.66
DAB hold		Swing		

=== 1990s ===
Eastern District Council Election, 1999: Mount Parker
Party	Candidate	Votes	%	±%
DAB	Wong Kin-pan	1,065	48.97	
HKPA	Yuen Ki-kong	622	28.60	
Democratic	Yan Wing-lok	488	22.44	
Majority		443	20.37	
DAB gain from HKPA		Swing		

Eastern District Board Election, 1994: Mount Parker
Party	Candidate	Votes	%	±%
Public Affairs Society	Yuen Ki-kong	Uncontested		
Public Affairs Society win (new seat)				
