= Kwai Chung Estate North (constituency) =

Hong Kong constituency

- Elected constituency for the Kwai Tsing District Council
- Boundary of Kwai Chung Estate North in Kwai Tsing District
- District: Kwai Tsing
- Legislative Council constituency: New Territories South West
- Population: 20,053 (2019)
- Electorate: 10,859 (2019)

Current constituency
- Created: 2011
- Number of members: One
- Member: vacant

Kwai Chung Estate North (Chinese: 葵涌邨北) is one of the 31 constituencies of the Kwai Tsing District Council in Hong Kong. The seat elects one member of the council every four years. It was first created in the 2011 elections. Its boundary is loosely based on part of Kwai Chung Estate in Kwai Chung with estimated population of 20,053.

== Councillors represented ==
| Election | Member | Party |
|---|---|---|
| 2011 | Simon Leung Kam-wai→vacant | NWSC |
| 2018 | Simon Leung Kam-wai→vacant | Independent democrat |

== Election results ==
=== 2010s ===
Kwai Tsing District Council Election, 2019: Kwai Chung Estate North
| Party | Candidate | Votes | % | ±% |
|---|---|---|---|---|
| PfD | Simon Leung Kam-wai | 4,396 | 57.86 | |
| DAB | Leung Kong-ming | 3,169 | 41.71 | |
| Nonpartisan | Guo Sanquan | 33 | 0.43 | |
| Majority | | 1,227 | 16.15 | |
| Turnout | | 7,624 | 70.24 | |
| PfD hold | | Swing | | |
