= Ching On (constituency) =

Constituency in Wong Tai Sin District, Hong Kong

- Elected constituency for the Wong Tai Sin District Council
- Boundary of Ching On in Wong Tai Sin District
- District: Wong Tai Sin
- Legislative Council constituency: Kowloon Central
- Population: 22,446 (2019)
- Electorate: 12,072 (2019)

Current constituency
- Created: 2003
- Number of members: One
- Member: (Vacant)

Ching On
- Traditional Chinese: 正安
Transcriptions
Yue: Cantonese
- Yale Romanization: Jing ōn
- Jyutping: Zing3 on1

Ching On is one of the 25 constituencies in the Wong Tai Sin District in Hong Kong. The constituency returns one district councillor to the Wong Tai Sin District Council, with an election every four years.

The constituency has an estimated population of 22,446.

== Councillors represented ==
Election	Member	Party
2003	Wong Yat-yuk→vacant	Democratic
200?	Wong Yat-yuk→vacant	Independent

== Election results ==
=== 2010s ===
Wong Tai Sin District Council Election, 2019: Ching On
Party	Candidate	Votes	%	±%
Independent	Wong Yat-yuk	5,862	69.41	
FTU	Lau Hok-lim	2,584	30.59	
Majority		3,278	38.82	
Turnout		8,469	70.24	
Independent hold		Swing		
