= Lower Ngau Tau Kok Estate (constituency) =

Hong Kong constituency

- Elected constituency for the Kwun Tong District Council
- Boundary of Lower Ngau Tau Kok Estate in Kwun Tong District
- District: Kwun Tong
- Legislative Council constituency: Kowloon East
- Population: 17,513 (2019)
- Electorate: 10,487 (2019)

Current constituency
- Created: 2015
- Number of members: One
- Member: Li Wing-shan (Nonpartisan)
- Created from: Jordan Valley and Ngau Tau Kok

Lower Ngau Tau Kok Estate (Chinese: 牛頭角下邨) is one of the 37 constituencies in the Kwun Tong District of Hong Kong which was created in 2015.

The constituency loosely covers part of Lower Ngau Tau Kok Estate with the estimated population of 17,513.

== Councillors represented ==
Election	Member	Party
2015	Benny Cheung Yiu-pan	DAB
2019	Li Wing-shan	Nonpartisan

== Election results ==
=== 2010s ===
Kwun Tong District Council Election, 2019: Lower Ngau Tau Kok Estate
Party	Candidate	Votes	%	±%
Nonpartisan	Li Wing-shan	3,962	51.68	
DAB	Benny Cheung Yiu-pan	3,704	48.32	−6.88
Majority		258	3.36	
Turnout		7,692	73.36	
Nonpartisan hold		Swing		

Kwun Tong District Council Election, 2015: Lower Ngau Tau Kok Estate
Party	Candidate	Votes	%	±%
DAB	Benny Cheung Yiu-pan	2,441	55.2	
Democratic	Wong Ching-fung	1,979	44.8	
Majority		462	10.4	
Turnout		4,497	53.2	
DAB win (new seat)				
