= Tsim Sha Tsui West (constituency) =

- Elected constituency for the Yau Tsim Mong District Council
- Boundary of Tsim Sha Tsui West in Yau Tsim Mong District
- District: Yau Tsim Mong
- Legislative Council constituency: Kowloon West
- Population: 12,673 (2019)
- Electorate: 3,649 (2019)

Current constituency
- Created: 1994
- Number of members: One
- Member: Leslie Chan Ka-long (Independent)

Tsim Sha Tsui West (Chinese: 尖沙咀西) is one of the 20 constituencies in the Yau Tsim Mong District. The constituency returns one district councillor to the Yau Tsim Mong District Council, with an election every four years.

== Councillors represented ==
Election	Member	Party
1994	Lee King-wah	PAS
199?	Lee King-wah	Independent
2003	Chan Kin-shing	Independent democrat
2007	Hung Chiu-wah	DAB
2019	Leslie Chan Ka-long→vacant	Independent

== Election results ==
=== 2010s ===
Yau Tsim Mong District Council Election, 2019: Tsim Sha Tsui West
Party	Candidate	Votes	%	±%
Independent	Leslie Chan Ka-long	1,003	51.04	
DAB	Alex Poon King-wo	788	40.10	
Independent	Frederick Fung Kin-kee	154	7.84	
Independent	Leung Hang-fai	124	6.31	
Independent	Abdull Ghafar Khan	35	1.78	
Majority		215	10.94	
Turnout		2,109	57.80	
Independent gain from DAB		Swing		
