= Hok Yuen Laguna Verde (constituency) =

- Elected constituency for the Kowloon City District Council
- Boundary of Hok Yuen Laguna Verde in Kowloon City District
- District: Kowloon City
- Legislative Council constituency: Kowloon Central
- Population: 18,511 (2019)
- Electorate: 8,079 (2019)

Current constituency
- Created: 1991
- Number of members: One
- Member: Vacant

Hok Yuen Laguna Verde (Chinese: 鶴園海逸), previously called Hok Yuen, is one of the 25 constituencies in the Kowloon City District of Hong Kong which was created in 1991.

The constituency has an estimated population of 18,511.

== Councillors represented ==
Election	Member	Party
1991	Siu Yuen-sheung	LDF
1997	Siu Yuen-sheung	Progressive Alliance
2005	Siu Yuen-sheung	DAB
2015	Admond Yue Chee-wing	Independent
2019	Tony Kwok Tin-lap→Vacant (Note: Disqualified on 28 September 2021.)	Democratic

== Election results ==
=== 2010s ===
Kowloon City District Council Election, 2019: Hok Yuen Laguna Verde
Party	Candidate	Votes	%	±%
Democratic	Tony Kwok Tin-lap	3,054	52.63	
Independent	Admond Yue Chee-wing	2,683	46.23	
Nonpartisan	Lee Ho-pui	66	1.14	
Majority		371	6.40	
Turnout		5,841	72.30	
Democratic gain from Independent		Swing		
