= Sau Mau Ping North (constituency) =

Hong Kong constituency

- 秀茂坪北
- Elected constituency for the Kwun Tong District Council
- Boundary of Sau Mau Ping North in Kwun Tong District
- District: Kwun Tong
- Legislative Council constituency: Kowloon East
- Population: 19,055 (2019)
- Electorate: 11,047 (2019)

Current constituency
- Created: 1999
- Number of members: One
- Member: Raymond Tang Wai-man (Independent)

Sau Mau Ping North
- Traditional Chinese: 秀茂坪北
Transcriptions
Yue: Cantonese
- Yale Romanization: Sau mauh pìhng bāk
- Jyutping: Sau3 mau6 ping4 bak1

Sau Mau Ping North is one of the 37 constituencies in the Kwun Tong District of Hong Kong which was created in 1991.

The constituency has an estimated population of 19,055.

== Councillors represented ==
Election	Member	Party
1999	Mak Fu-ling	DAB
2003	Ng Siu-cheong	Independent
2011	Wong Chun-ping	Independent
2019	Raymond Tang Wai-man	Independent

== Election results ==
=== 2010s ===
Kwun Tong District Council Election, 2019: Sau Mau Ping North
Party	Candidate	Votes	%	±%
Nonpartisan	Raymond Tang Wai-man	3,993	52.84	
Nonpartisan	Wong Chun-ping	3,564	47.16	
Majority		429	5.68	
Turnout		7,596	68.82	
Nonpartisan gain from Nonpartisan		Swing		
