= Sau Mau Ping South (constituency) =

Hong Kong constituency

- 秀茂坪南
- Elected constituency for the Kwun Tong District Council
- Boundary of Sau Mau Ping South in Kwun Tong District
- District: Kwun Tong
- Legislative Council constituency: Kowloon East
- Population: 20,193 (2019)
- Electorate: 11,045 (2019)

Current constituency
- Created: 1999
- Number of members: One
- Member: Jimmy Chan Yiu-hung (Independent)

Sau Mau Ping South
- Traditional Chinese: 秀茂坪南
Transcriptions
Yue: Cantonese
- Yale Romanization: Sau mauh pìhng nàahm
- Jyutping: Sau3 mau6 ping4 naam4

Sau Mau Ping South is one of the 37 constituencies in the Kwun Tong District of Hong Kong which was created in 1991.

The constituency has an estimated population of 20,193.

== Councillors represented ==
Election	Member	Party
1999	Ng Siu-cheong	Independent
2003	Mak Fu-ling	DAB
2015	Chan Yiu-hung	Independent

== Election results ==
=== 2010s ===
Kwun Tong District Council Election, 2019: Sau Mau Ping South
Party	Candidate	Votes	%	±%
Nonpartisan	Jimmy Chan Yiu-hung	3,977	51.73	
Nonpartisan	Lei Tsz-shing	3,711	48.27	
Majority		266	3.46	
Turnout		7,723	69.98	
Nonpartisan hold		Swing		
