= Lai Chi Kok South (constituency) =

Hong Kong constituency

- Elected constituency for the Sham Shui Po District Council
- Boundary of Lai Chi Kok South in Sham Shui Po District
- District: Sham Shui Po
- Legislative Council constituency: Kowloon West
- Population: 16,785 (2019)
- Electorate: 11,207 (2019)

Current constituency
- Created: 2007
- Number of members: One
- Member: Yeung Yuk (ADPL)
- Created from: Lai Chi Kok; Un Chau

Lai Chi Kok South (Chinese: 荔枝角南) is one of the 25 constituencies in the Sham Shui Po District of Hong Kong which was created in 2007.

The constituency loosely covers Hoi Lai Estate in Lai Chi Kok and Stonecutters Island with the estimated population of 16,785.

== Councillors represented ==
Election	Member	Party
2007	Wong Chi-yung	ADPL
2015	Yeung Yuk	ADPL

== Election results ==
=== 2010s ===
Sham Shui Po District Council Election, 2019: Lai Chi Kok South
Party	Candidate	Votes	%	±%
ADPL	Yeung Yuk	5,292	62.72	−10.30
DAB	Elaine Wu Wanqiu	3,145	37.28	+12.27
Majority		2,147	25.44	
Turnout		8,455	75.48	
ADPL hold		Swing		

Sham Shui Po District Council Election, 2015: Lai Chi Kok South
Party	Candidate	Votes	%	±%
ADPL	Yeung Yuk	3,477	73.02	−5.35
DAB	Derrick Tan Wie-hon	1,191	25.01	+3.38
Nonpartisan	Mui Yu	94	1.97	
Majority		2,286	47.01	
Turnout		4,762	53.85	
ADPL hold		Swing		

Sham Shui Po District Council Election, 2011: Lai Chi Kok South
Party	Candidate	Votes	%	±%
ADPL	Wong Chi-yung	3,507	78.37	+11.31
DAB	Leung Un-shing	968	21.63	−10.57
Majority		2,539	56.74	
Turnout		4,475	49.63	
ADPL hold		Swing		

=== 2000s ===
Sham Shui Po District Council Election, 2007: Lai Chi Kok South
Party	Candidate	Votes	%	±%
ADPL	Wong Chi-yung	2,366	67.06	
FTU (DAB)	Chan Yan-chuen	1,136	32.20	
CLP	Wong Chi-yung	26	0.74	
Majority		1,230	34.86	
ADPL win (new seat)				
