= Yau Tong East (constituency) =

Constituency in the Kwun Tong District of Hong Kong

- 油塘東
- Elected constituency for the Kwun Tong District Council
- Boundary of Yau Tong East in Kwun Tong District
- District: Kwun Tong
- Legislative Council constituency: Kowloon East
- Population: 15,754 (2019)
- Electorate: 8,421 (2019)

Current constituency
- Created: 2003
- Number of members: One
- Member: Kung Chun-ki (Independent)

Yau Tong East
- Traditional Chinese: 油塘東
Transcriptions
Yue: Cantonese
- Yale Romanization: Yàuh tòhng dūng
- Jyutping: Jau4 tong4 dung1

Yau Tong East is one of the 37 constituencies in the Kwun Tong District of Hong Kong which was created in 1991.

The constituency has an estimated population of 15,754.

== Councillors represented ==
Election	Member	Party
2003	Fan Wai-kwong	Independent
2011	Jack Cheung Ki-tang	DAB
2019	Ricky Kung Chun-ki	Independent

== Election results ==
=== 2010s ===
Kwun Tong District Council Election, 2019: Yau Tong East
Party	Candidate	Votes	%	±%
Nonpartisan	Ricky Kung Chun-ki	2,997	50.21	
DAB	Jack Cheung Ki-tang	2,972	49.79	
Majority		25	0.42	
Turnout		6,003	71.35	
Nonpartisan gain from DAB		Swing		
