= Jordan West (constituency) =

- Elected constituency for the Yau Tsim Mong District Council
- Boundary of Jordan West in Yau Tsim Mong District
- District: Yau Tsim Mong
- Legislative Council constituency: Kowloon West
- Population: 16,654 (2019)
- Electorate: 7,182 (2019)

Current constituency
- Created: 2007
- Number of members: One
- Member: Natalie Tsui Wai-fong (Independent)

Jordan West (Chinese: 佐敦西) is one of the 20 constituencies in the Yau Tsim Mong District. The constituency returns one district councillor to the Yau Tsim Mong District Council, with an election every four years.

== Councillors represented ==
Election	Member	Party
2007	Chan Siu-tong	DAB
2017	Chan Siu-tong	BPA
2019	Natalie Tsui Wai-fong→vacant	Independent democrat

== Election results ==
=== 2010s ===
Yau Tsim Mong District Council Election, 2019: Jordan West
Party	Candidate	Votes	%	±%
PfD	Natalie Tsui Wai-fong	2,604	53.84	
BPA	Chan Siu-tong	2,233	46.16	
Majority		371	7.68	
Turnout		4,863	67.73	
PfD gain from BPA		Swing		
