= Po Tat (constituency) =

Hong Kong constituency

- 寶達
- Elected constituency for the Kwun Tong District Council
- Boundary of Po Tat in Kwun Tong District
- District: Kwun Tong
- Legislative Council constituency: Kowloon East
- Population: 20,490 (2019)
- Electorate: 11,430 (2019)

Current constituency
- Created: 2003
- Number of members: One
- Member: Fung Ka-lung (Nonpartisan)

Po Tat
- Traditional Chinese: 寶達
Transcriptions
Yue: Cantonese
- Yale Romanization: Bóu daaht
- Jyutping: Bou2 daat6

Po Tat is one of the 37 constituencies in the Kwun Tong District of Hong Kong which was created in 2003.

The constituency has an estimated population of 20,490.

== Councillors represented ==
Election	Member	Party
2003	So Ka-ho	Democratic
2007	Hung Kam-in	DAB
2019	Fung Ka-lung	Nonpartisan

== Election results ==
=== 2010s ===
Kwun Tong District Council Election, 2019: Po Tat
Party	Candidate	Votes	%	±%
Nonpartisan	Fung Ka-lung	4,311	52.21	
DAB	Hung Kam-in	3,946	47.79	
Majority		365	4.42	
Turnout		8,303	72.73	
Nonpartisan gain from DAB		Swing		
