= Results breakdown of the 2019 Hong Kong local elections =

2019 Hong Kong local elections
- 24 November 2019
- Turnout: 71.23% ▲
Party	Leader	Vote %	Seats	+/–
Democratic	Wu Chi-wai	12.36	91	+54
Civic	Alvin Yeung	4.83	32	+20
DAB	Starry Lee	16.78	21	−96
Neo Democrats	Yam Kai-bong & others	3.00	19	+7
ADPL	Sze Tak-loy	2.63	19	+7
Labour	Kwok Wing-kin	0.96	7	+4
FTU	Ng Chau-pei	4.39	5	−21
Liberal	Felix Chung	0.94	5	−3
NWSC	Leung Yiu-chung	0.55	4	+2
BPA	Lo Wai-kwok	2.27	3	−16
This lists parties that won seats. See the complete results below.

This is the results breakdown of the 2019 District Council elections in Hong Kong. The results are generated from the Hong Kong Registration and Electoral Office website.

== Result overview ==
Election results:

Council/ Party	CW	WC	E	S	YTM	SSP	KC	WTS	KT	TW	TM	YL	N	TP	SK	ST	KWT	I	TOTAL
Democratic	7		4	7	4	2	10	6	9	3	7	7	5			6	12	1	90
Civic			5	1	1	4		2	4	3						7	3	2	32
ND										2			3	4	9	1			19
ADPL						11		3			5								19
CST																8			8
TCHD										1	2	4							7
Labour			2							1	2				1	1			7
CGPLTKO															6				6
CM					5														5
CA														4	1				5
TMCN											4								4
NWSC												1					3		4
TSWC												4							4
TPDA														3					3
VSA	2	1																	3
Civ Passion												1		1					2
DA												2							2
DTW										2									2
TKOP															2				2
LSD			1													1			2
SKC															2				2
TKOS															2				2
PP								1											1
EHK											1								1
TYP																	1		1
LMCG											1								1
CSWWF						1													1
CKWEF			1																1
TWCN										1									1
KEC									1										1
SK							1												1
CAP									1										1
TSWLPU												1							1
Ind & others	5	8	19	7	7	4	4	13	13	3	6	13	7	7	3	16	8	4	147
Pro-democrats	14	9	32	15	17	22	15	25	28	16	28	33	15	19	26	40	27	7	388
DAB			1		1	2	4		6		1		1			1	3	1	21
FTU			1						1	1	1		1						5
Liberal	1	1	1	1			1												5
BPA							3				1					1			5
FPHE									2	1									3
Roundtable											1						1		2
Ind & others		3		1	2		2		3	2		12	5	2	5		1	10	48
Pro-Beijing	1	4	3	2	3	2	10	0	12	4	4	12	7	2	5	2	5	11	89
Others						1				1									2
Vacant																			
Councillors	15	13	35	17	20	25	25	25	40	21	32	45	22	21	31	42	32	18	479

=== Central and Western ===
Code	Constituency	Incumbent	Pro-democracy Candidate(s)	Pro-Beijing Candidate(s)	Other Candidate(s)	Results
A01	Chung Wan	Hui Chi-fung (DP)	Hui Chi-fung (DP) 55.09%	Wong Chung-wai (Ind) 44.91%		Democratic hold
A02	Mid Levels East	Ng Siu-hong (DP)	Ng Siu-hong (DP) 57.28%	Samuel Mok Kam-sum (DAB) 42.72%		Democratic hold
A03	Castle Road	Cheng Lai-king (DP)	Cheng Lai-king (DP) 51.05%	Karl Fung Kar-leung (LP) 48.95%		Democratic hold
A04	Peak	Jeremy Young Chit-on (LP)	Thomas Uruma Kuninobu (2047HKM) 31.35%	Jeremy Young Chit-on (LP) 68.65%		Liberal hold
A05	University	Stephen Chan Chit-kwai (Ind)	Yam Ka-yi (Ind) 51.35% Au Chung-yin (Ind) 2.08%	Stephen Chan Chit-kwai (Ind) 46.57%		Independent gain from Independent
A06	Kwun Lung	Yeung Hoi-wing (DAB)	Fergus Leung Fong-wai (Ind) 50.69% Chow Sai-kit (VSA) 2.19%	Yeung Hoi-wing (DAB) 47.12%		Independent gain from DAB
A07	Kennedy Town & Mount Davis	Chan Hok-fung (DAB)	Cherry Wong Kin-ching (PfD) 59.45%	Chan Hok-fung (DAB) 39.60%	Mavis Lam Suet-ying (Ind) 0.95%	PfD gain from DAB
A08	Sai Wan	Cheung Kwok-kwan (DAB)	Pang Ka-ho (Ind) 56.48% Shirley Wong Mi-hing (Ind) 0.69%	Cheung Kwok-kwan (DAB) 42.83%		Independent gain from DAB
A09	Belcher	Yip Wing-shing (Ind)	Victor Yeung Sui-yin (DP) 52.66%	Yip Wing-shing (Ind) 46.34% Fung King-yin (Ind) 1.00%		Democratic gain from Independent
A10	Shek Tong Tsui	Chan Choi-hi (Ind)	Sam Yip Kam-lung (Ind) 55.27%	Chan Choi-hi (Ind) 44.73%		Independent gain from Independent
A11	Sai Ying Pun	Lo Yee-hang (DAB)	Wong Weng-chi (Ind) 55.39%	Timothy Lau Tin-ching (DAB) 44.61%		Independent gain from DAB
A12	Sheung Wan	Kam Nai-wai (DP)	Kam Nai-wai (DP) 59.41%	Lui Hung-pan (FTU) 40.59%		Democratic hold
A13	Tung Wah	Bonnie Ng Hoi-yan (DP)	Bonnie Ng Hoi-yan (DP) 60.84%	Cheung Ka-yan (DAB) 39.16%		Democratic hold
A14	Centre Street	Sidney Lee Chi-hang (Ind)	Cheung Kai-yin (DP) 58.90%	Sidney Lee Chi-hang (Ind) 41.10%		Democratic gain from Independent
A15	Water Street	Yeung Hok-ming (DAB)	Ho Chi-wang (Ind) 59.62%	Yeung Hok-ming (DAB) 40.38%		Independent gain from DAB

=== Wan Chai ===
Code	Constituency	Incumbent	Pro-democracy Candidate(s)	Pro-Beijing Candidate(s)	Other Candidate(s)	Results
B01	Hennessy	Cheng Ki-kin (Ind)	Sabina Koo Kwok-wai (Ind) 42.23% Ha Hei-lok (Ind) 25.99%	Wong Sau-tung (Ind) 31.77%		Independent gain from Independent
B02	Oi Kwan	Anna Tang King-yung (DAB)	Law Wai-shan (Ind) 57.45%	Muk Ka-chun (DAB) 42.55%		Independent gain from DAB
B03	Canal Road	Jacqueline Chung Ka-man (DAB)	Mak King-sing (Ind) 57.76%	Jacqueline Chung Ka-man (DAB) 42.24%		Independent gain from DAB
B04	Causeway Bay	Yolanda Ng Yuen-ting (Ind)	Cathy Yau Man-shan (Ind) 54.96%	Yolanda Ng Yuen-ting (Ind) 45.04%		Independent gain from Independent
B05	Victoria Park	Jennifer Chow Kit-bing (DAB)	Li Wing-choi (PfD/VSA) 54.07%	Jennifer Chow Kit-bing (DAB) 45.93%		VSA/PfD gain from DAB
B06	Tin Hau	Joey Lee Man-lung (Ind)	Chan Yuk-lam (Ind) 52.50%	Joey Lee Man-lung (Ind) 47.50%		Independent gain from Independent
B07	Tai Hang	Clarisse Yeung Suet-ying (Ind)	Clarisse Yeung Suet-ying (Ind) 62.02%	Liu Tin-shing (Ind) 37.98%		Independent hold
B08	Jardine's Lookout	Wind Lam Wai-man (LP)	Charlton Cheung (Ind) 30.87% John Tse Wing-ling (Ind) 10.57%	Wind Lam Wai-man (LP) 58.56%		Liberal hold
B09	Broadwood	Paul Tse Wai-chun (Ind)	Yeung Tsz-chun (Ind) 47.08%	Paul Tse Wai-chun (Ind) 52.92%		Independent hold
B10	Happy Valley	Stephen Ng Kam-chun (Ind)	Clara Cheung (Ind) 49.27% Vivian Chan Wing-ha (2047HKM) 5.22%	Sam Ng Chak-sum (Ind) 45.51%		Independent gain from Independent
B11	Stubbs Road	Wong Wang-tai (Ind)	Frankie Chow Kam-kei (Ind) 45.47%	Wong Wang-tai (Ind) 54.53%		Independent hold
B12	Southorn	Lee Pik-yee (Ind)	Chris Chan Kam-shing (Ind) 48.00%	Lee Pik-yee (Ind) 52.00%		Independent hold
B13	Tai Fat Hau	Kenny Lee Kwun-yee (DAB)	Leung Pak-kin (Ind) 51.46%	Kenny Lee Kwun-yee (DAB) 48.54%		Independent gain from DAB

=== Eastern ===
Code	Constituency	Incumbent	Pro-democracy Candidate(s)	Pro-Beijing Candidate(s)	Other Candidate(s)	Results
C01	Tai Koo Shing West	Andrew Chiu Ka-yin (DP)	Andrew Chiu Ka-yin (DP) 62.87%	Kacee Ting Wong (BPA) 37.13%		Democratic hold
C02	Tai Koo Shing East	Patrick Wong Chun-sing (Ind)	Patrick Wong Chun-sing (Ind) 60.95%	Calvin Kwok Ho-king (NPP) 39.05%		Independent hold
C03	Lei King Wan	Yeung Sze-chun (Ind)	Alice Wei Siu-lik (Ind) 57.22%	Cheung Man-sung (Ind) 42.78%		Independent gain from Independent
C04	Sai Wan Ho	Mak Tak-ching (Lab)	Mak Tak-ching (Lab) 63.08%	Lam Tsz-hung (NPP) 36.92%		Labour hold
C05	Aldrich Bay	Ngan Chun-lim (DAB)	So Yat-hang (DP) 54.39%	Kwok Wing-kin (DAB) 44.59%	Simon Yuen Tak-chun (ASEA) 1.02%	Democratic gain from DAB
C06	Shaukeiwan	Lam Sum-lim (DAB)	Leung Wing-sze (Ind) 62.82%	Lam Sum-lim (DAB) 37.18%		Independent gain from DAB
C07	A Kung Ngam	George Lam Kei-tung (Ind)	Kwok Chi-chung (SKWEF) 52.71%	George Lam Kei-tung (Ind) 39.80%	Eugene Chan Yat-him (Ind) 7.49%	SKWEF gain from Independent
C08	Heng Fa Chuen	Stanley Ho Ngai-kam (FTU)	Christine Wong Yi (Ind) 56.41%	Stanley Ho Ngai-kam (FTU) 43.59%		Independent gain from FTU
C09	Tsui Wan	Ku Kwai-yiu (Ind)	Ku Kwai-yiu (Ind) 55.63%	Lau Suk-yin (DAB/FTU) 44.37%		Independent hold
C10	Yan Lam	Wong Kin-hing (Ind)	Alice Ishigami Lee Fung-king (PfD) 52.18%	Wong Kin-hing (Ind) 46.43%	Windy Tan Yi-chun (Ind) 1.39%	PfD gain from Independent
C11	Siu Sai Wan	Wong Kwok-hing (FTU)	Chan Wing-tai (Ind) 53.67%	Li Kok-yan (FTU/DAB) 41.52% Chu Yat-on (Ind) 4.81%		Independent gain from FTU
C12	King Yee	David Leung Kwok-hung (FTU)	Tsang Yan-ying (Ind) 57.14%	David Leung Kwok-hung (FTU) 35.64% Yeung Hon-sing (Ind) 7.21%		Independent gain from FTU
C13	Wan Tsui	Kung Pak-cheung (DAB)	Ng Cheuk-ip (Ind) 54.01%	Kung Pak-cheung (DAB) 45.37%	Wong Kam-yin (Ind) 0.62%	Independent gain from DAB
C14	Fei Tsui	Joseph Lai Chi-keong (Civ)	Joseph Lai Chi-keong (Civ) 56.70%	Chan Hoi-wing (DAB/FTU) 43.30%		Civic hold
C15	Mount Parker	Wong Kin-pan (DAB)	Lai Yik-ming (Ind) 48.32%	Annie Lee Ching-har (DAB) 51.68%		DAB hold
C16	Braemar Hill	Shiu Ka-fai (LP)	Matthew Lai Kwok-him (Ind) 44.77%	Kenny Yuen Kin-chung (LP) 55.23%		Liberal hold
C17	Fortress Hill	Frankie Lo Wing-kwan (Ind)	Jason Chan Ka-yau (Ind) 57.72%	Frankie Lo Wing-kwan (Ind) 42.28%		Independent gain from Independent
C18	City Garden	Hui Ching-on (Ind)	Chau Hui-yan (Ind) 47.13%	Ricky Fan Hai-tai (Ind) 42.95% Hui Ching-on (Ind) 9.93%		Independent gain from Independent
C19	Provident	Kwok Wai-keung (FTU)	Duncann Chan (Ind) 48.94%	Kwok Wai-keung (FTU) 49.68%	Andrew Lam Sze-nam (ASEA) 1.38%	FTU hold
C20	Fort Street	Hung Lin-cham (DAB)	Karrine Fu Kai-lam (Ind) 50.61%	Hung Lin-cham (DAB) 49.39%		Independent gain from DAB
C21	Kam Ping	Choy So-yuk (DAB)	Lee Yue-shun (Civ) 50.70%	Hung Chi-kit (DAB) 49.30%		Civic gain from DAB
C22	Tanner	Cheng Tat-hung (Civ)	Cheng Tat-hung (Civ) 57.65%	Tsang Cheuk-yi (LP) 42.35%		Civic hold
C23	Healthy Village	Cheng Chi-sing (DAB)	James Pui Chi-lap (Ind) 53.24%	Cheng Chi-sing (DAB) 46.76%		Independent gain from DAB
C24	Quarry Bay	Eddie Ting Kong-ho (DAB)	Chan Po-king (Ind) 55.37%	Eddie Ting Kong-ho (DAB) 44.63%		Independent gain from DAB
C25	Nam Fung	Cheung Kwok-cheong (DP)	Cheung Kwok-cheong (DP) 65.48%	Ricky Wong Sze-chin (BPA) 34.52%		Democratic hold
C26	Kornhill	Bonnie Leung Wing-man (Civ)	Derek Ngai Chi-ho (Civ) 59.12%	Nathan Chau Cheuk-yin (NPP) 40.88%		Civic hold
C27	Kornhill Garden	Leung Siu-sun (Civ)	Leung Siu-sun (Civ) 59.24%	Dana Lau Sing-she (NPP) 40.76%		Civic hold
C28	Hing Tung	Hui Lam-hing (FTU)	Cheung Chun-kit (HECG) 57.82%	Hui Lam-hing (FTU) 42.18%		HTTHECG gain from FTU
C29	Lower Yiu Tung	Dominic Wong Chi-chung (DAB)	Ho Wai-lun (Lab) 60.55%	Dominic Wong Chi-chung (DAB) 39.45%		Labour gain from DAB
C30	Upper Yiu Tung	Chiu Chi-keong (FTU)	Chow Cheuk-ki (DP) 52.78%	Ng Ching-ching (FTU) 47.22%		Democratic gain from FTU
C31	Hing Man	Lau Hing-yeung (DAB)	Tse Miu-yee (Ind) 51.44%	Lau Hing-yeung (DAB) 48.56%		Independent gain from DAB
C32	Lok Hong	Li Chun-chau (Ind)	Bull Tsang Kin-shing (LSD) 56.00%	Li Chun-chau (Ind) 44.00%		LSD gain from Independent
C33	Tsui Tak	Lee Chun-keung (LP)	Peter Choi Chi-keung (Ind) 53.41%	Lee Chun-keung (LP) 46.59%		Independent gain from Liberal
C34	Yue Wan	Chui Chi-kin (Ind)	Chui Chi-kin (Ind) 59.46%	Lau Kin (DAB/FTU) 37.01% Tsai Chui-wan (Ind) 3.06%	Woo Kin-nam (Ind) 0.47%	Independent hold
C35	Kai Hiu	Elaine Chik Kit-ling (DAB/FTU)	Lai Tsz-yan (Ind) 49.28%	Elaine Chik Kit-ling (DAB/FTU) 41.77% Enki Tan Chun-chun (Ind) 8.95%		Independent gain from DAB/FTU

=== Southern ===
Code	Constituency	Incumbent	Pro-democracy Candidate(s)	Pro-Beijing Candidate(s)	Other Candidate(s)	Results
D01	Aberdeen	Pauline Yam (Ind)	Angus Wong Yui-hei (Ind) 62.11%	Pauline Yam (Ind) 37.51%	Lee Kin-shing (Ind) 0.38%	Independent gain from Independent
D02	Ap Lei Chau Estate	Lam Yuk-chun (Ind)	Chan Po-ming (DP) 48.57%	Lam Yuk-chun (Ind) 51.43%		Independent hold
D03	Ap Lei Chau North	Cheung Sik-yung (Ind)	Chan Ping-yeung (DP) 61.88%	Cheung Sik-yung (Ind) 38.12%		Democratic gain from Independent
D04	Lei Tung I	Au Nok-hin (Ind)	Chan Yan-yi (DP) 62.89%	Albert Ng Ka-san (DAB) 37.11%		Democratic gain from Independent
D05	Lei Tung II	Lo Kin-hei (DP)	Lo Kin-hei (DP) 62.84%	Tan Jinjie (DAB/FTU) 37.16%		Democratic hold
D06	South Horizons East	Lam Kai-fai (Ind)	James Yu Chun-hei (Civ) 55.89%	Lam Kai-fai (Ind) 44.11%		Civic gain from Independent
D07	South Horizons West	Judy Kapui Chan (NPP)	Kelvin Lam Ho-por (Ind) 56.27%	Judy Kapui Chan (NPP) 43.73%		Independent gain from NPP
D08	Wah Kwai	Ada Mak Tse How-ling (DAB)	Poon Ping-hong (DP) 59.34%	Ada Mak Tse How-ling (DAB) 40.66%		Democratic gain from DAB
D09	Wah Fu South	Au Lap-sing (Ind)	Li Shee-lin (DP) 55.74%	Wong Choi-lap (DAB/FTU) 44.26%		Democratic gain from Independent
D10	Wah Fu North	Chai Man-hon (DP)	Yim Chun-ho (DP) 61.32%	Cheung Wai-nam (DAB) 38.68%		Democratic hold
D11	Pokfulam	Paulus Johannes Zimmerman (Ind)	Paulus Johannes Zimmerman (Ind) 55.97%	Danny Siu Wai-chung (DAB) 40.43% Maxine Yao Jie-ning (Ind) 3.60%		Independent hold
D12	Chi Fu	Chu Ching-hong (Ind)	Andrew Lam Tak-wo (Ind) 61.00%	Lucy Lo Siu (Ind) 39.00%		Independent gain from Independent
D13	Tin Wan	Chan Fu-ming (Ind)	Tiffany Yuen Ka-wai (Ind) 61.70%	Chan Fu-ming (Ind) 38.30%		Independent gain from Independent
D14	Shek Yue	Chu Lap-wai (DAB)	Chan Hin-chung (Ind) 56.21%	Chu Lap-wai (DAB) 43.79%		Independent gain from DAB
D15	Wong Chuk Hang	Tsui Yuen-wa (DP)	Tsui Yuen-wa (DP) 57.93%	Chan Wing-yan (FTU/DAB) 42.07%		Democratic hold
D16	Bays Area	Fergus Fung Se-goun (LP)	Ding Wai-leung (Ind) 30.01%	Jonathan Leung Chun (LP) 69.99%		Liberal hold
D17	Stanley & Shek O	Lee Pui-ying (Ind)	Michael Pang Cheuk-kei (Ind) 49.86% Chan Shun-yee (Ind) 1.92%	Lee Pui-ying (Ind) 48.22%		Independent gain from Independent

=== Yau Tsim Mong ===
Code	Constituency	Incumbent	Pro-democracy Candidate(s)	Pro-Beijing Candidate(s)	Other Candidate(s)	Results
E01	Tsim Sha Tsui West	Derek Hung Chiu-wah (DAB)	Leslie Chan Ka-long (Ind) 47.67% Frederick Fung Kin-kee (Ind) 7.32% Abdull Ghafar Khan (Ind) 1.67%	Alex Poon King-wo (DAB) 37.45% Leung Hang-fai (Ind) 5.89%		Independent gain from DAB
E02	Kowloon Station	New Seat	Cindy Li Wing-yin (DP) 47.53%	Derek Hung Chiu-wah (DAB) 50.33%	Yung Hei-chi (Ind) 2.14%	DAB gain new seat
E03	Jordan West	Chan Siu-tong (BPA)	Natalie Tsui Wai-fong (PfD) 53.84%	Chan Siu-tong (BPA) 46.16%		PfD gain from BPA
E04	Yau Ma Tei South	Benny Yeung Tsz-hei (DAB)	Suzanne Wu Sui-shan (CM) 55.10%	Benny Yeung Tsz-hei (DAB) 44.90%		Community March gain from DAB
E05	Charming	Chung Kong-mo (DAB)	Lee Wai-fung (DP) 54.75%	Chung Kong-mo (DAB) 43.53%	Wong Wai-tat (Ind) 1.72%	Democratic gain from DAB
E06	Mong Kok West	Hui Tak-leung (Ind)	Chan Yuen-pan (Ind) 45.95%	Hui Tak-leung (Ind) 54.05%		Independent hold
E07	Fu Pak	Yu Tak-po (Civ)	Yu Tak-po (Civ) 62.54%	Chan Tak-lap (Ind) 37.46%		Civic hold
E08	Olympic	James To Kun-sun (DP)	James To Kun-sun (DP) 58.13%	Lee Ka-hin (Ind) 41.87%		Democratic hold
E09	Cherry	Chung Chak-fai (Ind)	Gloria Ng Hiu-man (Civ) 46.58%	Chung Chak-fai (Ind) 53.42%		Independent hold
E10	Tai Kok Tsui South	Benjamin Choi Siu-fung (DAB)	Tsang Tsz-ming (DP) 56.00%	Benjamin Choi Siu-fung (DAB) 44.00%		Democratic gain from DAB
E11	Tai Kok Tsui North	Lau Pak-kei (DAB)	Owan Li (Ind) 52.16%	Lau Pak-kei (DAB) 47.84%		Independent gain from DAB
E12	Tai Nan	Li Sze-man (BPA/KWND)	Lee Kwok-kuen (CM) 58.32%	Li Sze-man (BPA) 40.55%	Choi Ki-lung (Ind) 1.13%	Community March gain from BPA/KWND
E13	Mong Kok North	Wong Shu-ming (BPA/KWND)	Lucifer Siu Tak-kin (Ind) 51.00%	Wong Shu-ming (BPA/KWND) 49.00%		Independent gain from BPA/KWND
E14	Mong Kok East	Wong Kin-san (BPA/KWND)	Ben Lam (CM) 59.39%	Wong Kin-san (BPA) 40.61%		Community March gain from BPA
E15	Mong Kok South	Chow Chun-fai (Ind)	Chu Kong-wai (CM) 53.09%	Chow Chun-fai (Ind) 46.91%		Community March gain from Independent
E16	Yau Ma Tei North	Lam Kin-man (Ind)	Lam Kin-man (Ind) 67.43%	Lee Man-kit (Ind) 32.57%		Independent hold
E17	East Tsim Sha Tsui & King's Park	Michelle Tang Ming-sum (Ind)	Leo Chu Tsz-lok (DP) 52.69%	Michelle Tang Ming-sum (Ind) 47.31%		Democratic gain from Independent
E18	Jordan North	Craig Jo Chun-wah (DAB)	Frank Ho Fu-wing (Ind) 56.02%	Craig Jo Chun-wah (DAB) 43.98%		Independent gain from DAB
E19	Jordan South	Chris Ip Ngo-tung (DAB)	Chan Tsz-wai (PfD) 51.10%	Chris Ip Ngo-tung (DAB) 48.90%		PfD gain from DAB
E20	Tsim Sha Tsui Central	Kwan Sau-ling (DAB)	Ho Cheuk-hin (CM) 56.78%	Kwan Sau-ling (DAB) 43.22%		Community March gain from DAB

=== Sham Shui Po ===
Code	Constituency	Incumbent	Pro-democracy Candidate(s)	Pro-Beijing Candidate(s)	Other Candidate(s)	Results
F01	Po Lai	Leung Yau-fong (ADPL)	Mak Wai-ming (ADPL) 63.96%	Tam Chun-yu (BPA) 33.82%	Foo Wai-lok (Ind) 2.22%	ADPL hold
F02	Cheung Sha Wan	Aaron Lam Ka-fai (BPA/KWND)	Leos Lee Man-ho (CSWP) 61.04%	Poon Chiu-fai (BPA) 38.22%	Yip Chi-ho (Ind) 0.75%	CSWCEP gain from BPA/KWND
F03	Nam Cheong North	Vincent Cheng Wing-shun (DAB)	Lao Ka-hang (Civ) 54.89%	Vincent Cheng Wing-shun (DAB) 43.73%	Wong Hiu-shing (Ind) 1.38%	Civic gain from DAB
F04	Shek Kip Mei	Chan Kwok-wai (BPA/KWND)	Jeffrey Sin Kam-ho (Ind) 50.08%	Chan Kwok-wai (BPA/KWND) 49.92%		Independent gain from BPA/KWND
F05	Nam Cheong East	Kalvin Ho Kai-ming (ADPL)	Kalvin Ho Kai-ming (ADPL) 60.99%	Chan Lung-kit (DAB) 39.01%		ADPL hold
F06	Nam Cheong South	Lee Wing-man (FLU)	Li Ting-fung (ADPL) 57.37%	Lee Wing-man (FLU) 42.63%		ADPL gain from FLU
F07	Nam Cheong Central	Nicole Lau Pui-yuk (DAB)	Lam Sin-tung (Ind) 48.40%	Nicole Lau Pui-yuk (DAB) 51.60%		DAB hold
F08	Nam Cheong West	Wai Woon-nam (ADPL)	Wai Woon-nam (ADPL) 63.27%	Ha Wing-ka (Ind) 36.73%		ADPL hold
F09	Fu Cheong	Leung Man-kwong (BPA/KWND)	Wong Kit-long (CSWWF) 51.10%	Leung Man-kwong (BPA/KWND) 48.90%		CSWWF gain from BPA/KWND
F10	Lai Kok	Joephy Chan Wing-yan (DAB/FTU)	Li Kwing (ADPL) 54.07%	Joephy Chan Wing-yan (FTU/DAB) 45.93%		ADPL gain from DAB/FTU
F11	Fortune	Zoe Chow Wing-heng (DP)	Ronald Tsui Yat-hin (ADPL) 50.61%	Cheung Tak-wai (DAB) 49.39%		ADPL gain from Democratic
F12	Pik Wui	New Seat	Zoe Chow Wing-heng (DP) 53.51% Ma Yu-sang (Ind) 4.39%	Wong Wing-wai (BPA) 42.09%		Democratic gain new seat
F13	Lai Chi Kok Central	Ramon Yuen Hoi-man (DP)	Ramon Yuen Hoi-man (DP) 63.54%	Bruce Li Ki-fung (BPA) 36.46%		Democratic hold
F14	Lai Chi Kok South	Yeung Yuk (ADPL)	Yeung Yuk (ADPL) 62.72%	Elaine Wu Wanqiu (DAB) 37.28%		ADPL hold
F15	Mei Foo South	Wong Tat-tung (DAB)	Chau Yuen-man (Civ) 56.33%	Wong Tat-tung (Ind) 43.67%		Civic gain from DAB
F16	Mei Foo Central	Ng Yuet-lan (Civ)	Ng Yuet-lan (Civ) 60.14%	Isaac Yip Pui-lam (NPP) 39.86%		Civic hold
F17	Mei Foo North	Ambrose Cheung Wing-sum (Ind)	Joshua Li Chun-hei (Civ) 62.06%	Law Siu-yin (Ind) 17.82%	Virginia Lee Wing-cheung (Ind) 20.12%	Civic gain from Independent
F18	Lai Chi Kok North	Chum Tak-shing (ADPL)	Chum Tak-shing (ADPL) 66.62%	Gary Chau Chun-fai (KWND) 33.38%		ADPL hold
F19	Un Chau	New Seat (previously Un Chau & So Uk)	Lee Hon-ting (ADPL) 53.61%	Chan Wai-ming (DAB) 46.39%		ADPL gain new seat
F20	So Uk	New Seat	Chan Ming-kei (ADPL) 48.29%	Ho Kwan-chau (DAB) 50.74%	Lam Pui-man (Ind) 0.98%	DAB gain new seat
F21	Lei Cheng Uk	Kong Kwai-sang (ADPL)	Kong Kwai-sang (ADPL) 61.26%	Chan Keng-chau (BPA) 36.96%	Lam Ho-nam (Ind) 1.78%	ADPL hold
F22	Lung Ping & Sheung Pak Tin	Carman Ng Mei (Ind)	Carman Ng Mei (Ind) 70.58%	Law Kwok-ho (KWND) 29.42%		Independent hold
F23	Ha Pak Tin	Yan Kai-wing (Ind)	Fong Chi-lung (Ind) 7.74% Chan Chak-shing (Ind) 0.73%	Raymond Lam Wai-man (DAB/FTU) 34.64%	Yan Kai-wing (Ind) 56.89%	Independent hold
F24	Yau Yat Tsuen	Dominic Lee Tsz-king (LP)	Lau Wai-chung (Ind) 50.98%	Dominic Lee Tsz-king (LP) 49.02%		Independent gain from Liberal
F25	Nam Shan, Tai Hang Tung & Tai Hang Sai	Tam Kwok-kiu (ADPL)	Tam Kwok-kiu (ADPL) 57.25%	Chen Lihong (Ind) 40.69%	Chui Chun-nam (Ind) 1.46% Chan Ping-fai (Ind) 0.59%	ADPL hold

=== Kowloon City ===
Code	Constituency	Incumbent	Pro-democracy Candidate(s)	Pro-Beijing Candidate(s)	Other Candidate(s)	Results
G01	Ma Tau Wai	Terence Siu Tin-hung (DAB)	Tsang Kin-chiu (Ind) 52.84%	Siu Tin-hung (DAB) 46.00%	Lam Tin-yan (Ind) 1.15%	Independent gain from DAB
G02	Sung Wong Toi	Yeung Chun-yu (Ind)	Yeung Chun-yu (Ind) 67.59%	Wu Ming-tai (FTU) 26.10% Alexander Ip Chi-wai (Ind) 6.31%		Independent hold
G03	Ma Hang Chung	Lai Kwong-wai (DP)	Lai Kwong-wai (DP) 61.14% Chan Hiu-wai (Ind) 1.29%	Tang Hou-tong (FTU/DAB) 37.57%		Democratic hold
G04	Ma Tau Kok	Kwan Ho-yeung (DAB)	Ma Hei-pang (DP) 52.79%	Kwan Ho-yeung (DAB) 46.37%	Ching Man-ki (Ind) 0.84%	Democratic gain from DAB
G05	Lok Man	Yang Wing-kit (Ind)	Vincent Lam (Ind) 44.86%	Yang Wing-kit (Ind) 55.14%		Independent hold
G06	Sheung Lok	Luk King-kwong (DAB)	Wong Wing-kit (DP) 57.63%	Luk King-kwong (DAB) 40.87%	Ng Ka-fai (Ind) 1.50%	Democratic gain from DAB
G07	Ho Man Tin	Cheng Lee-ming (Ind)	Joshua Fung Man-tao (DP) 51.41%	Cheng Lee-ming (Ind) 47.27%	Wasabi Chong Hiu-ying (Ind) 1.33%	Democratic gain from Independent
G08	Kadoorie	Siu Leong-sing (DP)	Siu Leong-sing (DP) 63.52%	Wong Man-kong (Ind) 36.48%		Democratic hold
G09	Prince	Ting Kin-wa (Ind)	Wong Kwok-tung (DP) 51.32% Tam Kit-man (Ind) 3.35%	Ting Kin-wa (Ind) 45.33%		Democratic gain from Independent
G10	Kowloon Tong	Ho Hin-ming (LP)	Matthew Wan Chung-yin (Civ) 46.51%	Ho Hin-ming (LP) 53.49%		Liberal hold
G11	Lung Shing	Ng Po-keung (DAB)	Frankie Fung Tat-chun (Ind) 47.48%	Ng Po-keung (DAB) 49.97%	Fong Ngai-yin (Ind) 2.55%	DAB hold
G12	Kai Tak North	Leung Yuen-ting (BPA/KWND)	Tsang Chun-tat (Ind) 44.88%	Leung Yuen-ting (BPA) 54.48%	Wong Tsz-chun (Ind) 0.64%	BPA hold
G13	Kai Tak East	New Seat	Tony Wong Yip-tung (Ind) 41.02%	He Huahan (BPA) 58.98%		BPA gain new seat
G14	Kai Tak Central & South	He Huahan (BPA/KWND)	Leung Wing-yan (Civ) 46.48%	Cheung King-fan (Ind) 53.52%		Independent gain from BPA
G15	Hoi Sham	Pun Kwok-wah (DAB)	Jack Tung Kai-man (Ind) 49.78%	Pun Kwok-wah (DAB) 50.22%		DAB hold
G16	To Kwa Wan North	Starry Lee Wai-king (DAB)	Leung Kwok-hung (LSD) 44.98%	Starry Lee Wai-king (DAB) 55.02%		DAB hold
G17	To Kwa Wan South	Jimmy Lam Pok (Ind)	Timothy Lee Hin-long (Ind) 50.83% Wong Yi-ting (Ind) 2.81%	Jimmy Lam Pok (Ind) 46.36%		Independent gain from Independent
G18	Hok Yuen Laguna Verde	Admond Yue Chee-wing (Ind)	Tony Kwok Tin-lap (DP) 52.63%	Admond Yue Chee-wing (Ind) 46.23%	Lee Ho-pui (Ind) 1.14%	Democratic gain from Independent
G19	Whampoa East	Leung Mei-fun (BPA/KWND)	Kwan Ka-lun (Ind) 57.66%	Lee Chiu-yu (BPA) 42.34%		Independent gain from BPA
G20	Whampoa West	Kwong Po-yin (Ind)	Kwong Po-yin (Ind) 61.84%	Cheng Hiu-ling (Ind) 38.16%		Independent hold
G21	Hung Hom Bay	Cheung Yan-hong (BPA/KWND)	Pius Yum Kwok-tung (DP) 55.36%	Wong Chi (Ind) 41.87%	Lam Tsz-yan (Ind) 2.77%	Democratic gain from BPA/KWND
G22	Hung Hom	Lam Tak-shing (DAB)	Kwan Siu-lun (Ind) 46.14%	Lam Tak-shing (DAB) 53.86%		DAB hold
G23	Ka Wai	Lo Chiu-kit (Ind)	Chau Hei-man (DP) 51.81%	Lo Chiu-kit (Ind) 47.46%	Li Chun-lung (Ind) 0.73%	Democratic gain from Independent
G24	Oi Man	Ng Fan-kam (DAB)	Mak Sui-ki (DP) 53.30%	Ng Fan-kam (DAB) 46.70%		Democratic gain from DAB
G25	Oi Chun	Cho Wui-hung (BPA/KWND)	Chan Lai-kwan (DP) 46.52% Leung Ka-lee (Ind) 6.52%	Cho Wui-hung (BPA) 46.96%		BPA hold

=== Wong Tai Sin ===
Code	Constituency	Incumbent	Pro-democracy Candidate(s)	Pro-Beijing Candidate(s)	Other Candidate(s)	Results
H01	Lung Tsui	Lee Tung-kong (Ind)	Chong Ting-wai (PfD) 52.34%	Lee Tung-kong (Ind) 47.66%		PfD gain from Independent
H02	Lung Ha	Kwok Sau-ying (Ind)	Kwok Sau-ying (Ind) 66.72%	Chung Pok-man (Ind) 33.28%		Independent hold
H03	Lung Sheung	Lam Man-fai (FTU)	Chan Chun-yue (Ind) 55.47%	Lam Man-fai (FTU) 44.53%		Independent gain from FTU
H04	Fung Wong	Joe Chan Yim-kwong (Ind)	Tang Wai-keung (DP) 61.15%	Yeung Nok-hin (Ind) 38.85%		Democratic gain from Independent
H05	Fung Tak	Kan Chi-ho (DAB)	Cheung Ka-yi (TWSCP) 56.13%	Yuet Ngai-keung (DAB) 43.87%		TWSCP gain from DAB
H06	Lung Sing	Tam Heung-man (Ind)	Tam Heung-man (Ind) 65.77%	Ivan Mok Ka-kit (Ind) 29.21% Chan Chun-hung (Ind) 3.62% Ngok King-fun (Ind) 1.40%		Independent hold
H07	San Po Kong	Wendy Lui Kai-lin (Ind)	Chan Kai-shun (Ind) 55.77%	Wendy Lui Kai-lin (Ind) 44.23%		Independent gain from Independent
H08	Tung Tau	Li Tak-hong (DAB)	Hiroko Wan Chi-chung (PP) 51.09%	Li Tak-hong (DAB) 48.91%		People Power gain from DAB
H09	Tung Mei	Sze Tak-loy (ADPL)	Sze Tak-loy (ADPL) 67.72%	Yeung Kwong-fu (DAB) 32.28%		ADPL hold
H10	Lok Fu	Andie Chan Wai-kwan (Ind)	Leung Ming-hong (Ind) 55.53%	Andie Chan Wai-kwan (Ind) 44.47%		Independent gain from Independent
H11	Wang Tau Hom	Joe Lai Wing-ho (DAB)	Lau Ka-man (Civ) 57.05%	Joe Lai Wing-ho (DAB) 42.95%		Civic gain from DAB
H12	Tin Keung	Chan On-tai (LP)	Cheng Man-kit (Civ) 59.98%	Chan On-tai (LP) 40.02%		Civic gain from Liberal
H13	Tsui Chuk & Pang Ching	Leonard Chan Ying (Ind)	Yau Hon-pong (Ind) 48.65%	Leonard Chan Ying (Ind) 48.68%	Anthony Sham Hi-ming (Ind) 5.67%	Independent gain from Independent
H14	Chuk Yuen South	Hui Kam-shing (ADPL)	Hui Kam-shing (ADPL) 59.84%	Lee Kin-chung (FTU) 40.16%		ADPL hold
H15	Chuk Yuen North	Roy Ting Chi-wai (Ind)	Cheng Tsz-kin (Ind) 55.50%	Roy Ting Chi-wai (Ind) 44.50%		Independent gain from Independent
H16	Tsz Wan West	Yuen Kwok-keung (DAB)	Cheung Mau-ching (DP) 57.91%	Yuen Kwok-keung (DAB) 42.09%		Democratic gain from DAB
H17	Ching Oi	Maggie Chan Man-ki (Ind)	Sham Yu-hin (TWSCP) 61.10%	Poon Cheuk-bun (DAB) 38.90%		TWSCP gain from Independent
H18	Ching On	Wong Yat-yuk (Ind)	Wong Yat-yuk (Ind) 69.41%	Lau Hok-lim (FTU) 30.59%		Independent hold
H19	Tsz Wan East	Ho Hon-man (DAB)	Mok Yee-ha (PfD) 56.51%	Ho Hon-man (DAB) 43.49%		PfD gain from DAB
H20	King Fu	Wu Chi-wai (DP)	Rosanda Mok Ka-han (DP) 58.75%	Wong Chun-kin (FTU) 41.25%		Democratic hold
H21	Choi Wan East	Timothy Choy Tsz-kin (DAB)	Liu Sing-lee (ADPL) 51.77%	Timothy Choy Tsz-kin (DAB) 48.23%		ADPL gain from DAB
H22	Choi Wan South	Sum Wan-wah (DP)	Sum Wan-wah (DP) 58.01%	Kong King-san (DAB) 41.99%		Democratic hold
H23	Choi Wan West	Tam Mei-po (DAB/FTU)	Chan Lee-shing (DP) 54.39%	Tam Mei-po (FTU/DAB) 45.61%		Democratic gain from DAB/FTU
H24	Chi Choi	Wu Chi-kin (DP)	Wu Chi-kin (DP) 58.67%	So Ka-lok (FTU) 41.33%		Democratic hold
H25	Choi Hung	Mok Kin-wing (FTU)	Sean Mock Ho-chit (CHESSA) 50.60%	Mok Kin-wing (FTU) 49.40%		CHESSA gain from FTU

=== Kwun Tong ===
Code	Constituency	Incumbent	Pro-democracy Candidate(s)	Pro-Beijing Candidate(s)	Other Candidate(s)	Results
J01	Kwun Tong Central	Nelson Chan Wah-yu (Ind)	Edith Leung Yik-ting (DP) 56.05%	Nelson Chan Wah-yu (Ind) 43.95%		Democratic gain from Independent
J02	Kowloon Bay	Winnie Poon Yam Wai-chun (Ind)	Winnie Poon Yam Wai-chun (Ind) 65.21% Lai Chun-man (Ind) 24.28%		Lai Yu-hing (Ind) 10.52%	Independent hold
J03	Kai Yip	Sze Lun-hung (DAB)	Wan Ka-him (DP) 53.88%	Au Yeung Kwan-nok (DAB) 46.12%		Democratic gain from DAB
J04	Lai Ching	Sheik Anthony Bux (Civ)	Sheik Anthony Bux (Civ) 68.26%	Chan Sin-ting (Ind) 31.74%		Civic hold
J05	Ping Shek	Chan Chun-kit (DAB)	Lai Po-kwai (DP) 51.14%	Chan Chun-kit (DAB) 48.86%		Democratic gain from DAB
J06	Choi Tak	Tam Siu-cheuk (DAB)	Lam Tsz-kuen (Ind) 42.79%	Tam Siu-cheuk (DAB) 57.21%		DAB hold
J07	Jordan Valley	Ngan Man-yu (DAB)	Wong Ka-lok (Ind) 49.08%	Ngan Man-yu (DAB) 50.92%		DAB hold
J08	Shun Tin	Mok Kin-shing (DP)	Mok Kin-shing (DP) 62.03%	Benjamin Kwok Bit-chun (DAB) 37.97%		Democratic hold
J09	Sheung Shun	Fu Pik-chun (Ind)	Mark Leung Hon-kei (ADPL) 36.86%	Fu Pik-chun (Ind) 51.50% Chan Cho-kwong (Ind) 11.64%		Independent hold
J10	On Lee	Choy Chak-hung (Ind)	Choy Chak-hung (Ind) 57.69%	Tsang Wing-fai (DAB) 42.31%		Independent hold
J11	Kwun Tong On Tai	New Seat	Lin Kuan-tsun (DP) 43.58%	Lam Wai (FPHE) 56.42%		FPHE gain new seat
J12	Sau Mau Ping North	Wong Chun-ping (Ind)	Raymond Tang Wai-man (Ind) 52.84%	Wong Chun-ping (Ind) 47.16%		Independent gain from Independent
J13	Sau Mau Ping Central	Cheung Pui-kong (DAB)	Danny So Wai-yeung (Ind) 48.11%	Cheung Pui-kong (DAB) 51.89%		DAB hold
J14	On Tat	New Seat	Jason Siu Ho-yin (PfD) 40.06%	Hsu Yau-wai (DAB) 58.58%	Lau Pak-yuen (Ind) 0.72% Lee Seng-chang (Ind) 0.64%	DAB gain new seat
J15	Sau Mau Ping South	Jimmy Chan Yiu-hung (Ind)	Lei Tsz-shing (Ind) 48.27%	Jimmy Chan Yiu-hung (Ind) 51.73%		Independent hold
J16	Po Tat	Hung Kam-in (DAB)	Fung Ka-lung (Ind) 52.33%	Hung Kam-in (DAB) 47.67%		Independent gain from DAB
J17	Kwong Tak	Wilson Or Chong-shing (DAB)	Tam Tak-chi (PP) 48.94%	Wilson Or Chong-shing (DAB) 51.06%		DAB hold
J18	Hing Tin	Chan Man-kin (DP)	Nelson Ip Tsz-kit (DP) 58.17%	Alan Yu Siu-lun (FTU/DAB) 41.83%		Democratic hold
J19	Lam Tin	Kan Ming-tung (FTU)	Fung Tak-sum (Ind) 49.69%	Kan Ming-tung (FTU) 50.31%		FTU hold
J20	Ping Tin	Yiu Pak-leung (Ind)	Chan Yik-shun (Ind) 52.81%	Yiu Pak-leung (Ind) 47.19%		Independent gain from Independent
J21	Pak Nga	Ho Kai-ming (FTU)	Chan Man-kin (DP) 54.42% Chan Yu-ming (Ind) 1.96%	Ho Kai-ming (FTU) 43.62%		Democratic gain from FTU
J22	Chun Cheung	New Seat	Tse Suk-chun (Ind) 62.21%	Wong Kai-san (FTU) 37.79%		Independent gain new seat
J23	Yau Tong East	Cheung Ki-tang (DAB)	Kung Chun-ki (Ind) 50.21%	Cheung Ki-tang (DAB) 49.79%		Independent gain from DAB
J24	Yau Chui	Tse Suk-chun (Ind)	Chung Sui-kwan (Ind) 42.15% Leung Ka-shing (Ind) 1.11%	Pang Chi-sang (FPHE) 46.82% Chan Fu-king (Ind) 9.91%		FPHE gain from Independent
J25	Yau Lai	Patrick Lai Shu-ho (Ind)	Wang Wai-lun (Ind) 54.82%	Patrick Lai Shu-ho (Ind) 45.18%		Independent gain from Independent
J26	Yau Tong West	Lui Tung-hai (Ind)	Michael Wong Siu-nam (Ind) 47.89%	Lui Tung-hai (Ind) 52.11%		Independent hold
J27	Laguna City	Tang Wing-chun (Ind)	William Li Wai-lam (Civ) 62.01%	Tang Wing-chun (Ind) 37.99%		Civic gain from Independent
J28	King Tin	Cheung Shun-wah (Ind)	Wong Ka-ying (Civ) 61.58%	Danny Lui Sik-kwan (Ind) 38.42%		Civic gain from Independent
J29	Tsui Ping	Cheng Keung-fung (FPHE)	Hung Chun-hin (DP) 52.37%	Cheng Keung-fung (FPHE) 47.63%		Democratic gain from FPHE
J30	Hiu Lai	So Lai-chun (Ind)	Wilson Cheung Man-fung (Ind) 60.02%	So Lai-chun (Ind) 39.98%		Independent gain from Independent
J31	Po Lok	Cheng Keng-ieong (DP)	Cheng Keng-ieong (DP) 64.38%	Rio Fung Wang-yui (FPHE) 35.62%		Democratic hold
J32	Yuet Wah	Hsu Hoi-shan (Ind)	Jannelle Rosalynne Leung (Ind) 53.73%	Hsu Hoi-shan (Ind) 46.27%		Independent gain from Independent
J33	Hip Hong	Bunny Chan Chung-bun (Ind)	Li Ka-tat (PfD) 52.86%	Bunny Chan Chung-bun (Ind) 47.14%		PfD gain from Independent
J34	Lok Wah South	Kevin So Koon-chung (Ind)	Kevin So Koon-chung (Ind) 50.73%	Lee Ka-hang (FTU) 49.27%		Independent hold
J35	Lok Wah North	Wong Chi-ken (KEC)	Wong Chi-ken (Ind) 60.73%	Liang Li (FTU) 39.27%		Independent hold
J36	Hong Lok	Ma Yat-chiu (Ind)	Chris Chan Ka-yin (Ind) 57.80%	Ma Yat-chiu (Ind) 42.20%		Independent gain from Independent
J37	Ting On	Kam Kin (Ind)	Wong Kai-ming (DP) 56.14%	Kam Kin (Ind) 43.86%		Democratic gain from Independent
J38	Upper Ngau Tau Kok Estate	Ben Chan Kok-wah (DAB)	Cheng Chun-wah (Ind) 48.79%	Leung Tang-fung (DAB) 51.21%		DAB hold
J39	Lower Ngau Tau Kok Estate	Cheung Yiu-pan (DAB)	Li Wing-shan (Ind) 51.68%	Cheung Yiu-pan (DAB) 48.32%		Independent gain from DAB
J40	To Tai	Yip Hing-kwok (Ind)	Lee Kwan-chak (Civ) 62.16%	Yip Hing-kwok (Ind) 37.84%		Civic gain from Independent

=== Tsuen Wan ===
Code	Constituency	Incumbent	Pro-democracy Candidate(s)	Pro-Beijing Candidate(s)	Other Candidate(s)	Results
K01	Tak Wah	Lo Siu-kit (Ind)	Jackson Lau (DTW) 52.80%	Lo Siu-kit (Ind) 47.20%		Deliberation TW gain from Independent
K02	Yeung Uk Road	Chan Han-pan (DAB)	Lam Sek-tim (TWCN) 50.60% Wong Man-chau (Ind) 1.96%	Ng Chun-yu (DAB) 47.44%		TWCN gain from DAB
K03	Tsuen Wan South	New Seat	Antonio Luk Ling-chung (Civ) 54.34%	William Chan Kit (DAB) 30.99% Ma Ting-hei (RT) 14.66%		Civic gain new seat
K04	Hoi Bun	Chow Ping-tim (Ind)	Lester Shum (TCHD/PfD) 56.50% Leo Chan Yue-hai (PfD) 0.24%	Chow Ping-tim (Ind) 21.81% Marcus Mok Yuen-kwan (Ind) 21.44%		Team Chu gain from Independent
K05	Tsuen Wan West	Nixie Lam Lam (DAB)	Angus Yick Shing-chung (DP) 61.85%	Nixie Lam Lam (DAB) 38.15%		Democratic gain from DAB
K06	Clague Garden	Koo Yeung-pong (DAB)	Chan Kim-kam (Ind) 50.61%	Koo Yeung-pong (DAB) 49.39%		Independent gain from DAB
K07	Tsuen Wan Centre	Li Hung-por (DP)	Li Hung-por (DP) 61.06%	Tsang Tai (DAB/FTU) 38.94%		Democratic hold
K08	Discovery Park	Michael Tien Puk-sun (RT)	Adrian Lau Cheuk-yu (DTW) 54.18%	Michael Tien Puk-sun (RT) 45.82%		Deliberation TW gain from Roundtable
K09	Fuk Loi	Kot Siu-yuen (FTU)	Wong Charm-luen (DP) 43.15% Victoria Ng Ka-yee (Ind) 4.15%	Kot Siu-yuen (FTU) 52.70%		FTU hold
K10	Luk Yeung	Lam Faat-kang (Ind)	Roy Pun Long-chung (ND) 56.68%	Lam Faat-kang (Ind) 43.32%		Neo Democrats gain from Independent
K11	Ma Wan	Tam Hoi-pong (ND)	Tam Hoi-pong (ND) 69.09% Lun Chi-wai (Ind) 1.76%		Wong Chun-yeung (Ind) 29.15%	Neo Democrats hold
K12	Tsuen Wwan Rural	Norris Ng Hin-lung (Ind)	Tam Pui-yan (DTW) 39.74%	Jackson Kwan San-wai (Ind) 15.89%	Norris Ng Hin-lung (Ind) 44.37%	Independent hold
K13	Ting Sham	Cheng Chit-pun (RT)	Lau Chi-hung (PfD) 52.97%	Cheng Chit-pun (RT) 44.50% Brian Lam (Ind) 2.26%	Samuel Wong Chuen-lun (Ind) 0.27%	PfD gain from Roundtable
K14	Lai To	Wong Wai-kit (Ind)	Tse Man-chak (Ind) 58.45%	Wong Wai-kit (Ind) 41.55%		Independent gain from Independent
K15	Allway	Lam Yuen-pun (Ind)	Chiu Yan-loy (Lab) 56.32%	Lam Yuen-pun (Ind) 43.68%		Labour gain from Independent
K16	Cheung Shek	Chan Chun-chung (DAB)	Matthew Lai Man-fai (DP) 54.48%	Chan Chun-chung (DAB) 45.52%		Democratic gain from DAB
K17	Shek Wai Kok	Man Yu-ming (NTAS/FPHE)	Liu Ho-wan (Civ) 47.86%	Man Yu-ming (FPHE/NTAS) 52.14%		FPHE/NTAS hold
K18	Lei Muk Shue West	Wong Ka-wa (Civ)	Wong Ka-wa (Civ) 66.20%	Fung Cheuk-sum (FPHE) 33.80%		Civic hold
K19	Lei Muk Shue East	Sumly Chan Yuen-sum (Civ)	Sumly Chan Yuen-sum (Civ) 68.11%	Lam Hin-fai (DAB/FTU) 31.89%		Civic hold

=== Tuen Mun ===
Code	Constituency	Incumbent	Pro-democracy Candidate(s)	Pro-Beijing Candidate(s)	Other Candidate(s)	Results
L01	Tuen Mun Town Centre	Au Chi-yuen (Ind)	Lai Chun-wing (DP) 63.19%	Au Chi-yuen (Ind) 36.81%		Democratic gain from Independent
L02	Siu Chi	Lam Chung-hoi (DP)	Lam Chung-hoi (DP) 78.13%		Wong Ka-leung (Ind) 21.87%	Democratic hold
L03	On Ting	Kong Fung-yi (ADPL)	Kong Fung-yi (ADPL) 55.93%	Fung Pui-yin (FTU/DAB) 44.07%		ADPL hold
L04	Siu Tsui	Yip Man-pan (DAB)	Yan Pui-lam (PfD/TCHD) 57.73%	Yip Man-pan (DAB) 42.27%		Team Chu/PfD gain from DAB
L05	Yau Oi South	Tsang Hin-hong (DAB)	Lam Kin-cheung (Lab) 63.44%	Tsang Hin-hong (DAB) 36.56%		Labour gain from DAB
L06	Yau Oi North	Tam Chun-yin (Lab)	Lam Ming-yan (Lab) 63.47%	Ip Chun-yuen (DAB) 36.53%		Labour hold
L07	Tsui Hing	Chu Yiu-wah (RT)	Poon Chi-kin (TMCN) 60.62%	Chu Yiu-wah (RT) 39.38%		TMCN gain from Roundtable
L08	Shan King	Ng Koon-hung (Ind)	Wong Tan-ching (TMCN) 64.31%	Ng Dip-pui (Ind) 35.69%		TMCN gain from Independent
L09	King Hing	Chan Yau-hoi (FTU)	Law Cheuk-yung (TMCN) 47.90%	Chan Yau-hoi (FTU) 50.28%	Lau Hang-yi (Ind) 1.82%	FTU hold
L10	Hing Tsak	Tsui Fan (FTU)	Tsang Chun-hing (TMCN) 52.95%	Tsui Fan (FTU) 47.05%		TMCN gain from FTU
L11	San Hui	Kwu Hon-keung (Ind)	Cheung Ho-sum (USH) 60.49%	Kwu Hon-keung (Ind) 39.51%		Unity of San Hui gain from Independent
L12	So Kwun Wat	New Seat	Ma Kee (DP) 53.23%	Jeremy Chan Ka-ching (NPP) 31.72% Peter Lau Kai-man (RT) 15.05%		Democratic gain new seat
L13	Sam Shing	So Shiu-shing (NPP)	Michael Mo Kwan-tai (Ind) 56.32%	So Shiu-shing (NPP) 43.68%		Independent gain from NPP
L14	Hanford	Beatrice Chu Shun-nga (DP)	Beatrice Chu Shun-nga (DP) 66.07%	Fong Shun-yan (Ind) 33.93%		Democratic hold
L15	Yuet Wu	Cheung Hang-fai (DAB)	Wong Hung-ming (ADPL) 63.35% Kwun Tung-wing (Ind) 2.02%	Cheung Hang-fai (DAB) 34.62%		ADPL gain from DAB
L16	Siu Hei	Yan Siu-nam (ADPL)	Yan Siu-nam (ADPL) 68.51%	Tsoi Shing-hin (DAB) 31.49%		ADPL hold
L17	Wu King	Leung Kin-man (DAB)	Chow Kai-lim (ADPL) 67.83%	Leung Kin-man (DAB) 32.17%		ADPL gain from DAB
L18	Butterfly	Yeung Chi-hang (ADPL)	Yeung Chi-hang (ADPL) 60.37%	Chung Kin-fung (DAB) 39.63%		ADPL hold
L19	Fu Sun	Kam Man-fung (NPP)	Lee Ka-wai (FSG) 60.39%	Kam Man-fung (NPP) 39.61%		Fu Sun Generation gain from NPP
L20	Lok Tsui	Ho Kwan-yiu (Ind)	Lo Chun-yu (DP) 58.87%	Ho Kwan-yiu (Ind) 40.27%	Chiang Ching-man (Ind) 0.86%	Democratic gain from Independent
L21	Lung Mun	Lung Shui-hing (DAB)	Tsang Kam-wing (LMCG) 60.07%	Lung Shui-hing (DAB) 39.93%		LMCG gain from DAB
L22	San King	Catherine Wong Lai-sheung (DP)	Catherine Wong Lai-sheung (DP) 69.72%	Chan Tsim-heng (DAB) 30.28%		Democratic hold
L23	Leung King	Ching Chi-hung (DAB)	Wong Tak-yuen (TMCN) 57.59% Tang Man-kit (Civ Passion) 4.28%	Ching Chi-hung (DAB) 38.13%		TMCN gain from DAB
L24	Tin King	Lothar Lee Hung-sham (FTU)	Leung Ho-man (Ind) 52.60% Leung Yat-long (Civ Passion) 9.37%	Lothar Lee Hung-sham (FTU) 37.57%	Lui Mei-yuk (Ind) 0.46%	Independent gain from FTU
L25	Po Tin	So Ka-man (RT)	Cheung Tsan-wa (Ind) 42.39%	So Ka-man (RT) 57.61%		Roundtable hold
L26	Kin Sang	Chan Man-wah (DAB)	Law Pei-lee (PfD/TCHD) 60.44%	Chan Man-wah (DAB) 39.56%		Team Chu/PfD gain from DAB
L27	Siu Hong	Mo Shing-fung (DAB)	Josephine Chan Shu-ying (DP) 56.28%	Mo Shing-fung (DAB) 43.72%		Democratic gain from DAB
L28	Yan Tin	New Seat	Lo Wai-ming (DP) 39.86%	Apple Lai Ka-man (DAB) 47.08% Wong Chi-chun (RT) 13.06%		DAB gain new seat
L29	Tuen Mun Rural	To Sheck-yuen (Ind)	Kenneth Cheung Kam-hung (Ind) 60.17%	To Sheck-yuen (Ind) 39.83%		Independent gain from Independent
L30	Fu Tai	Manwell Chan (FTU)	Ho Kwok-ho (EHK) 61.76%	Manwell Chan (FTU) 38.24%		Empowering HK gain from FTU
L31	Prime View	Ho Hang-mui (DP)	Ho Hang-mui (DP) 67.63%	Kwong Man-tik (NPP) 32.37%		Democratic hold

=== Yuen Long ===
Code	Constituency	Incumbent	Pro-democracy Candidate(s)	Pro-Beijing Candidate(s)	Other Candidate(s)	Results
M01	Fung Nin	Lui Kin (DAB)	Kisslan Chan King-lun (Ind) 53.65%	Lui Kin (DAB) 46.35%		Independent gain from DAB
M02	Yuen Long Centre	Siu Long-ming (DAB)	Shek King-ching (DA) 59.47%	Siu Long-ming (DAB) 40.53%		Democratic Alliance gain from DAB
M03	Fung Cheung	Mak Ip-sing (DA)	Mak Ip-sing (DA) 61.02%	Chong Chin-ming (DAB) 38.98%		Democratic Alliance hold
M04	Yuen Lung	Wong Wai-shun (BPA)	Cheung Sau-yin (Ind) 58.13% Eric Chow Lok-ning (Ind) 0.13%	Wong Wai-shun (BPA) 41.74%		Independent gain from BPA
M05	Shap Pat Heung Central	Leung Ming-kin (Ind)	Willis Fong Ho-hin (Action 18) 60.57%	Leung Ming-kin (Ind) 37.33%	Chow Yip-ming (Ind) 2.10%	Action 18 gain from Independent
M06	Shui Pin	Yuen Man-yee (Ind)	Lai Kwok-wing (TCHD/PfD) 51.68% Ivaline Poon Sin-man (Ind) 1.17%	Yuen Man-yee (Ind) 47.15%		Team Chu gain from Independent
M07	Nam Ping	Zachary Wong Wai-yin (DP)	Zachary Wong Wai-yin (DP) 62.59%	Lam Wai-ming (DAB) 35.30% Chan Wai-yi (Ind) 2.12%		Democratic hold
M08	Pek Long	Kwong Chun-yu (DP)	Kwong Chun-yu (DP) 62.91%	August Tam Wai-lam (DAB) 37.09%		Democratic hold
M09	Yuen Long Tung Tau	New Seat	Lam Ting-wai (DP) 59.56%	Riben Li Kai-lap (DAB) 40.44%		Democratic gain new seat
M10	Shap Pat Heung North	New Seat	Adrian Lau Chun-yu (Action 18) 45.80%	Shum Ho-kit (Ind) 54.20%		Independent gain new seat
M11	Shap Pat Heung East	Shum Ho-kit (Ind)	Lee Chun-wai (PfD) 48.04%	Lam Tim-fook (Ind) 39.21% Wong Pak-yan (Ind) 12.75%		PfD gain from Independent
M12	Shap Pat Heung West	Leung Fuk-yuen (Ind)	Szeto Pok-man (Action 18/PfD) 49.76%	Leung Fuk-yuen (Ind) 45.19% Chan Yau-hung (Ind) 5.05%		Action 18/PfD gain from Independent
M13	Ping Shan South	Cheung Muk-lam (NTAS)	Leung Tak-ming (TCHD/PfD) 52.96% Wong Chung-ming (Ind) 0.30%	Cheung Wai-sum (Ind) 37.90% Tang Lung-wai (Ind) 8.83%		Team Chu/PfD gain from NTAS
M14	Hung Fuk	New Seat	Eddie Chan Shu-fai (PfD/TCHD) 52.08% Poon Sin-yan (Ind) 0.35%	Chui Kwan-siu (DAB) 47.57%		Team Chu/PfD gain new seat
M15	Ha Tsuen	Tang Ka-leung (Ind)	Tung Ching-kon (PfD) 41.59%	Tang Ka-leung (Ind) 58.41%		Independent hold
M16	Ping Shan Central	Tang Hing-ip (Ind)	Felix Cheung Chi-yeung (Ind) 51.94%	Tang Tat-sin (Ind) 48.06%		Independent gain from Independent
M17	Shing Yan	New Seat	Au Kwok-kuen (TCHD/PfD) 55.67% Ng Ka-chun (Ind) 0.96%	Lam Wai-ming (Ind) 23.58% Chong Ho-fung (RT) 18.85%	Wong Kwok-hung (Ind) 0.95%	Team Chu/PfD gain new seat
M18	Tin Shing	Chan Sze-ching (RT)	Hau Man-kin (TSWC) 54.18%	Chan Sze-ching (RT) 45.82%		TSW Connection gain from Roundtable
M19	Tin Yiu	Leung Che-cheung (DAB/NTAS)	Ho Wai-pan (NWSC) 55.34% Leung Chin-hang (Ind) 5.86%	Szeto Chun-hin (DAB/NTAS) 37.93%	Chan For-yi (Ind) 0.87%	NWSC gain from DAB/NTAS
M20	Yiu Yau	Ma Shuk-yin (DAB)	Ng Hin-wang (DP) 62.23%	Ma Shuk-yin (DAB) 37.77%		Democratic gain from DAB
M21	Tsz Yau	Chan Mei-lin (Ind)	Chan Mei-lin (Ind) 64.08%	So Yuen (DAB/NTAS) 35.92%		Independent hold
M22	Kingswood South	Cham Ka-hung (Ind)	Katy Ng Yuk-ying (DP) 55.13%	Cham Ka-hung (Ind) 44.87%		Democratic gain from Independent
M23	Shui Oi	Kwok Keung (DAB)	Lai Po-wa (DP) 53.73%	Tong Tak-chun (DAB) 35.06%	Wong Chi-fai (Ind) 11.20%	Democratic gain from DAB
M24	Shui Wah	Chow Wing-kan (Ind)	Lam Chun (TSWC) 58.62%	Chow Wing-kan (Ind) 33.56% Wong Chi-ngai (Ind) 7.83%		TSW Connection gain from Independent
M25	Chung Wah	Wong Wai-ling (DAB)	Chan Sze-nga (Ind) 57.72%	Wong Wai-ling (DAB) 42.28%		Independent gain from DAB
M26	Chung Pak	Wong Cheuk-kin (Ind)	Lee Wai-fung (Ind) 55.63% Cheung Kwok-tung (Ind) 3.21%	Christy Kwok Ching-yin (Ind) 41.16%		Independent gain from Independent
M27	Kingswood North	Lee Yuet-man (Ind)	Ng Kin-wai (TSWC) 49.93% Gavin To Ho-shun (Ind) 2.02%	Lee Yuet-man (Ind) 48.05%		TSW Connection gain from Independent
M28	Yuet Yan	Chiu Sau-han (Ind)	Hong Chin-wah (Ind) 54.63%	Fennie Lai Yuet-kwan (Ind) 45.37%		Independent gain from Independent
M29	Ching King	Tang Cheuk-him (FTU)	Kwok Man-ho (DP) 54.70%	Tang Cheuk-him (FTU) 45.30%		Democratic gain from FTU
M30	Fu Yan	Lau Kwai-yung (FTU)	Kwan Chun-sang (TSWC) 54.87%	Lau Kwai-yung (FTU) 45.13%		TSW Connection gain from FTU
M31	Yat Chak	Kwok Hing-ping (Ind)	Wong Wing-sze (Civ Passion) 58.14%	Kwok Hing-ping (Ind) 34.03% Regine Fan Hui-yu (Ind) 7.83%		Civic Passion gain from Independent
M32	Tin Heng	Michael Luk Chung-hung (FTU)	Wong Pak-yu (Ind) 61.21% Chan Ka-chun (Ind) 0.38%	Michael Luk Chung-hung (FTU) 38.04%	Stanley Chan Chi-shing (Ind) 0.38%	Independent gain from FTU
M33	Wang Yat	Yiu Kwok-wai (FTU)	Mo Kai-hong (Ind) 62.16% Kwan Ka-lai (Ind) 0.62%	Yiu Kwok-wai (FTU) 34.73% Cho Kin-for (Ind) 2.49%		Independent gain from FTU
M34	Ping Shan North	Young Ka-on (Ind)	Law Ting-fai (Ind) 49.98%	Young Ka-on (Ind) 50.02%		Independent hold
M35	Fairview Park	To Ka-lun (Ind)	To Ka-lun (Ind) 55.41%	Cheung Kung-fat (BPA) 41.10% Allan Wong Wing-ho (Ind) 2.50%	Chan Sang-fat (Ind) 0.99%	Independent hold
M36	San Tin	Man Ka-koy (Ind)	Tsui Kai-lung (Ind) 44.08%	Man Fu-wan (Ind) 48.96% Chau Chun-kun (Ind) 3.49% Man Kwai-ki (Ind) 3.47%		Independent gain from Independent
M37	Kam Tin	Tang Cheuk-yin (Ind)	Chris Li Chung-chi (Ind) 52.84%	Tang Cheuk-yin (Ind) 47.16%		Independent gain from Independent
M38	Pat Heung North	Ronnie Tang Yung-yiu (Ind)	Lee Kan-ming (Ind) 33.91%	Ronnie Tang Yung-yiu (Ind) 34.19% Tang Chi-kwong (Ind) 31.90%		Independent hold
M39	Pat Heung South	Lai Wai-hung (Ind)	Eddie Chu Hoi-dick (TCHD/PfD) 47.22% Jo Chui Cheuk-yin (TCHD) 0.56%	Lai Wing-tim (Ind) 52.22%		Independent gain from Independent

=== North ===
Code	Constituency	Incumbent	Pro-democracy Candidate(s)	Pro-Beijing Candidate(s)	Other Candidate(s)	Results
N01	Luen Wo Hui	Tsang Hing-lung (DAB)	Chow Kam-ho (LWU) 55.97% Kong Mei-ting (Ind) 0.52%	Tsang Hing-lung (DAB) 43.51%		Luen Wo United gain from DAB
N02	Fanling Town	George Pang Chun-sing (Ind)	Wong Hoi-ying (DP) 56.57%	George Pang Chun-sing (Ind) 37.49% Chris Yip Yiu-shing (Ind) 5.94%		Democratic gain from Independent
N03	Cheung Wah	Chan Yuk-ming (DP)	Chan Yuk-ming (DP) 52.28% Wong ka-ho (Ind) 16.24%	Lam Chi-yeung (DAB) 31.49%		Democratic hold
N04	Wah Do	Yiu Ming (DAB)	Cheung Chun-wai (NDB) 58.68%	Yiu Ming (DAB) 41.32%		NDB gain from DAB
N05	Wah Ming	Chan Wai-tat (ND)	Chan Wai-tat (ND) 61.42% Lau Ka-ho (Ind) 2.47%	Pun Hau-man (DAB) 36.11%		Neo Democrats hold
N06	Yan Shing	Lau Kwok-fan (DAB)	Lam Shuk-ching (ND) 57.84%	Lau Kwok-fan (DAB) 42.16%		Neo Democrats gain from DAB
N07	Fanling South	Raymond Ho Shu-kwong (Ind)	Franco Cheung Ching-ho (Ind) 46.28% Almustafa Lee Lap-hong (Ind) 11.30%	Raymond Ho Shu-kwong (Ind) 42.42%		Independent gain from Independent
N08	Shing Fuk	Warwick Wan Wo-tat (FTU)	Hendrick Lui Chi-hang (Ind) 34.99% Wong Leung-hi (ND) 23.11%	Warwick Wan Wo-tat (FTU) 41.90%		FTU hold
N09	Ching Ho	Larm Wai-leung (Ind)	Yuen Ho-lun (Ind) 53.83%	Larm Wai-leung (FPHE/NTAS) 39.18% Cheng Shi-lan (Ind) 6.99%		Independent gain from Independent
N10	Yu Tai	Kent Tsang King-chung (FTU)	Vincent Chan Chi-fung (Ind) 53.12%	Kent Tsang King-chung (FTU) 46.88%		Independent gain from FTU
N11	Sheung Shui Rural	Simon Hau Fuk-tat (Ind)	Hau Hiu-tung (Ind) 43.44%	Simon Hau Fuk-tat (Ind) 56.56%		Independent hold
N12	Choi Yuen	So Sai-chi (DAB)	Lam Tsz-king (DP) 55.23%	So Sai-chi (DAB) 42.50%	Wong Sing-chi (Ind) 2.27%	Democratic gain from DAB
N13	Shek Wu Hui	Lam Cheuk-ting (DP)	Lam Cheuk-ting (DP) 55.46% Clarence Ronald Leung Kam-shing (Ind) 6.63%	Hung Wing-yip (NPP/CF) 37.91%		Democratic hold
N14	Tin Ping West	Wong Wang-to (FTU)	Kwok Long-fung (DP) 60.45%	Wong Wang-to (FTU) 39.55%		Democratic gain from FTU
N15	Fung Tsui	Liu Hing-hung (DAB)	Chiang Man-ching (Ind) 55.06%	Liu Hing-hung (DAB) 44.94%		Independent gain from DAB
N16	Sha Ta	Wan Wo-fai (DAB)	Lester John Choy Yuk-wai (Ind) 41.63%	Ko Wai-kei (DAB) 58.37%		DAB hold
N17	Tin Ping East	Lau Ki-fung (ND)	Lau Ki-fung (ND) 63.07%	Windy Or Sin-yi (DAB) 34.94% Lui Yuk-shan (Ind) 2.00%		Neo Democrats hold
N18	Queen's Hill	Tony Tang Kun-nin (DAB)	Law Ting-tak (Ind) 53.28%	Tony Tang Kun-nin (DAB) 36.86%	Tang Chun-kin (Ind) 9.85%	Independent gain from DAB

=== Tai Po ===
Code	Constituency	Incumbent	Pro-democracy Candidate(s)	Pro-Beijing Candidate(s)	Other Candidate(s)	Results
P01	Tai Po Hui	Li Kwok-ying (DAB)	Lam Ming-yat (TPDA) 56.66%	William Cheung Kwok-wai (Ind) 43.34%		TPDA gain from DAB
P02	Chung Ting	Eric Tam Wing-fun (DAB)	Man Nim-chi (CA) 64.02%	Eric Tam Wing-fun (DAB) 35.98%		Community Alliance gain from DAB
P03	Tai Po Central	Au Chun-wah (Ind)	Au Chun-wah (CA) 66.70%	Mui Siu-fung (DAB) 33.30%		Community Alliance hold
P04	Tai Yuen	Cheng Chun-ping (DAB)	Au Chun-ho (CA) 57.81%	Cheng Chun-ping (DAB) 33.42% So Ma-tsun (Ind) 6.92%	Wong Ting-yan (Ind) 1.85%	Community Alliance gain from DAB
P05	Fu Heng	Yam Man-chuen (Ind)	Ho Wai-lam (Ind) 41.41% Yam Man-chuen (Ind) 26.05%	Wu Cheuk-him (DAB) 32.55%		Independent gain from Independent
P06	Yee Fu	Yam Kai-bong (ND)	Yam Kai-bong (ND) 70.86%	Lo Chi-ping (Ind) 29.14%		Neo Democrats hold
P07	Fu Ming Sun	Kwan Wing-yip (ND)	Kwan Wing-yip (ND) 70.42%	Ng Cheuk-wing (FTU) 29.58%		Neo Democrats hold
P08	Kwong Fuk & Plover Cove	Wong Pik-kiu (DAB)	Dalu Lin Kok-cheung (TPDA) 57.06% Kwok Shu-yan (Ind) 0.47%	Wong Pik-kiu (DAB) 42.47%		TPDA gain from DAB
P09	Wang Fuk	Clement Woo Kin-man (DAB)	Yiu Kwan-ho (CA) 56.73%	Clement Woo Kin-man (DAB) 43.27%		Community Alliance gain from DAB
P10	Tai Po Kau	Chan Siu-kuen (Ind)	Patrick Mo Ka-chun (TPDA) 53.55%	Chan Siu-kuen (Ind) 46.45%		TPDA gain from Independent
P11	Wan Tau Tong	Ken Yu Chi-wing (Ind)	Wong Siu-kin (Civ Passion) 60.60%	Ken Yu Chi-wing (Ind) 39.40%		Civic Passion gain from Independent
P12	San Fu	Lo Hiu-fung (BPA)	Wu Yiu-cheong (ND) 56.43%	Lo Hiu-fung (BPA) 43.57%		Neo Democrats gain from BPA
P13	Lam Tsuen Valley	Chan Cho-leung (BPA)	Richard Chan Chun-chit (TPDA) 52.05%	Chan Cho-leung (BPA) 47.95%		TPDA gain from BPA
P14	Po Nga	Chow Yuen-wai (ND)	Chow Yuen-wai (ND) 66.86%	Yip Chun-kit (DAB) 33.14%		Neo Democrats hold
P15	Tai Wo	Cheng Chun-wo (Ind)	Olive Chan Wai-ka (Ind) 58.56%	Cheng Chun-wo (Ind) 41.44%		Independent gain from Independent
P16	Old Market & Serenity	Lau Yung-wai (Ind)	Lau Yung-wai (Ind) 69.97%	Lau Man-kit (NPP/CF) 30.03%		Independent hold
P17	Hong Lok Yuen	Patrick Tang Ming-tai (Ind)	Zero Yiu Yeuk-sang (Ind) 57.72%	Patrick Tang Ming-tai (Ind) 42.28%		Independent gain from Independent
P18	Shuen Wan	Lau Chee-sing (Ind)	So Tat-leung (Ind) 50.99%	Lau Chee-sing (Ind) 49.01%		Independent gain from Independent
P19	Sai Kung North	David Ho Tai-wai (BPA)	Tam Yi-pui (Ind) 58.16%	Rex Li Wah-kwong (BPA) 41.84%		Independent gain from BPA

=== Sai Kung ===
Code	Constituency	Incumbent	Pro-democracy Candidate(s)	Pro-Beijing Candidate(s)	Other Candidate(s)	Results
Q01	Sai Kung Central	Ng Sze-fuk (DAB)	Zoe Leung Hin-yan (PfD/SKC) 54.41%	Ng Sze-fuk (DAB) 45.59%		Sai Kung Commons/PfD gain from DAB
Q02	Pak Sha Wan	Hiew Moo-siew (DAB)	Stanley Ho Wai-hong (Lab/PfD/SKC) 57.08%	Chan Kuen-kwan (DAB) 42.92%		Labour/PfD/SKC gain from DAB
Q03	Sai Kung Islands	Philip Li Ka-leung (DAB)	Debby Chan Ka-lam (PfD/SKC) 57.81%	Philip Li Ka-leung (DAB) 42.19%		Sai Kung Commons/PfD gain from DAB
Q04	Hang Hau East	Peter Lau Wai-cheung (Ind)	Ryan Lee Yin-ho (Ind) 49.57%	Peter Lau Wai-cheung (Ind) 41.77% Newman Lau Man-choi (Ind) 8.65%		Independent gain from Independent
Q05	Hang Hau West	Yau Yuk-lun (DAB)	Yu Tsun-ning (TKOS) 59.78%	Yau Yuk-lun (DAB) 40.22%		TKO Shining gain from DAB
Q06	Choi Kin	Raymond Ho Man-kit (Ind)	Chan Wai-lit (TKOP) 55.31% Adam Wong Ping-hung (Ind) 5.08%	Raymond Ho Man-kit (Ind) 23.29% Richie Tai Ka-chu (DAB) 15.29% Wong Yan-ket (Ind) 1.03%		TKO Pioneers gain from Independent
Q07	Kin Ming	Leung Li (ND)	Leung Li (ND) 73.49%	Rocco Ho Pok-ho (DAB) 26.51%		Neo Democrats hold
Q08	Do Shin	Cheung Chin-pang (Ind)	Winfield Chong Wing-fai (DP) 33.28% Li Pak-tong (Ind) 17.67%	Cheung Chin-pang (Ind) 49.05%		Independent hold
Q09	Wai King	Chan Kai-wai (Ind)	Brandon Kenneth Yip (Ind) 50.86%	Chan Kai-wai (Ind) 48.03%	Jack Wong Shing-kwong (Ind) 1.11%	Independent gain from Independent
Q10	Hoi Chun	New Seat	Ivan Lai Wai-tong (ND) 53.27% Chiu Chi-man (Ind) 6.09%	Lam Lok-yee (Ind) 34.26% Ho Kam-wing (Ind) 5.94%	Lau Wai-cheuk (Ind) 0.44%	Neo Democrats gain new seat
Q11	Po Yee	Tse Ching-fung (CGPLTKO)	Tse Ching-fung (Ind) 60.11%	Chu Lam (FTU) 36.17% Wong Heung-yin (Ind) 3.72%		Independent hold
Q12	Fu Kwan	Luk Ping-choi (CGPLTKO)	Luk Ping-choi (Ind) 61.31%	Wong Yuen-hong (FTU) 38.69%		Independent hold
Q13	O Tong	Lui Man-kwong (ND)	Lui Man-kwong (ND) 63.09%	Lam So-wai (Ind) 36.91%		Neo Democrats hold
Q14	Sheung Tak	Kan Siu-kei (FTU)	Lee Ka-yui (Ind) 61.29%	Kan Siu-kei (FTU) 38.71%		Independent gain from FTU
Q15	Kwong Ming	Chong Yuen-tung (DAB)	Ricky Or Yiu-lam (Ind) 56.80%	Chong Yuen-tung (DAB) 43.20%		Independent gain from DAB
Q16	Hong King	Frankie Lam Siu-chung (ND)	Frankie Lam Siu-chung (ND) 65.36%	Ken Chan King-chun (NPP/CF) 34.64%		Neo Democrats hold
Q17	Tsui Lam	Lanny Tam (Ind)	Choi Ming-hei (Ind) 55.47%	Lanny Tam (Ind) 44.53%		Independent gain from Independent
Q18	Po Lam	Alfred Au Ning-fat (NPP/CF)	Fung Kwan-on (ND) 57.60%	Tam Chuk-kwan (NPP/CF) 42.40%		Neo Democrats gain from NPP/CF
Q19	Yan Ying	Ben Chung Kam-lun (ND)	Ben Chung Kam-lun (ND) 63.81%	Lee Kwok-pong (Ind) 36.19%		Neo Democrats hold
Q20	Wai Yan	New Seat	Chun Hoi-shing (ND) 61.24%	Andrew Ng Ka-chun (Ind) 38.76%		Neo Democrats gain new seat
Q21	Wan Hang	Gary Fan Kwok-wai (ND)	Gary Fan Kwok-wai (ND) 65.16%	Lau Chi-shing (Ind) 1.84%	Yeung Chung (Ind) 32.26% Tai Cheuk-yin (Ind) 0.75%	Neo Democrats hold
Q22	King Lam	Wan Kai-ming (DAB)	Cheung Wai-chiu (TKOP) 51.47% Lam Wing-yin (Ind) 9.51%	Wan Kai-ming (DAB) 39.02%		TKO Pioneers gain from DAB
Q23	Hau Tak	Ling Man-hoi (DAB)	Wong Cheuk-nga (Ind) 59.44%	Ruby Mok (DAB) 40.56%		Independent gain from DAB
Q24	Fu Nam	Chan Pok-chi (DAB)	Andrew Chan Yiu-chor (Ind) 56.81%	Chan Pok-chi (DAB) 43.19%		Independent gain from DAB
Q25	Tak Ming	Wan Yuet-cheung (NPP/CF)	Cheng Chung-man (Ind) 56.24%	Chan Chi-ho (NPP/CF) 43.76%		Independent gain from NPP/CF
Q26	Nam On	Francis Chau Yin-ming (Ind)	Francis Chau Yin-ming (Ind) 67.92%	Chen Yuting (FTU) 32.08%		Independent hold
Q27	Kwan Po	Lai Ming-chak (ND)	Lai Ming-chak (ND) 62.40%	Li Ka-yan (Ind) 37.60%		Neo Democrats hold
Q28	Wan Po North	Christine Fong Kwok-shan (Ind)	Ho Tsz-chung (Ind) 41.78% Cyrus Chan Chin-chun (CA) 13.93%	Christine Fong Kwok-shan (Ind) 44.29%		Independent hold
Q29	Wan Po South	Chris Cheung Mei-hung (Ind)	David Kan Sun-wah (CGPLTKO) 30.43% Ng Ho-kei (Ind) 16.80%	Chris Cheung Mei-hung (Ind) 52.77%		Independent hold

=== Sha Tin ===
Code	Constituency	Incumbent	Pro-democracy Candidate(s)	Pro-Beijing Candidate(s)	Other Candidate(s)	Results
R01	Sha Tin Town Centre	Wai Hing-cheung (Ind)	Wai Hing-cheung (Ind) 67.98%	Calvin Tang Siu-fung (Ind) 32.02%		Independent hold
R02	Lek Yuen	Wong Yue-hon (CF)	Jimmy Sham Tsz-kit (LSD) 57.33%	Wong Yue-hon (CF) 42.67%		LSD gain from Civic Force
R03	Wo Che Estate	Anna Yue Shin-man (DAB)	Li Chi-wang (Ind) 59.09%	Anna Yue Shin-man (DAB) 38.79% Lau Wai-lam (Ind) 2.13%		Independent gain from DAB
R04	City One	Wong Ka-wing (NPP)	Wong Man-huen (Civ) 65.04%	Wong Ka-wing (NPP) 34.96%		Civic gain from NPP
R05	Yue Shing	Leung Ka-fai (NPP/CF)	William Shek (Ind) 62.28%	Leung Ka-fai (NPP/CF) 37.72%		Independent gain from NPP/CF
R06	Wong Uk	Lai Tsz-yan (Ind)	Lai Tsz-yan (CST) 66.72%	Leung Chi-wai (Ind) 33.28%		Community Sha Tin hold
R07	Sha Kok	Billy Chan Shiu-yeung (Ind)	Billy Chan Shiu-yeung (Ind) 59.25% Cheung Yuen-ying (Ind) 0.58%	Ha Kim-kwan (CF/NPP) 40.18%		Independent hold
R08	Pok Hong	Chiu Chu-pong (Ind)	Chiu Chu-pong (CST) 73.61%	Guo Xuantong (Ind) 26.39%		Community Sha Tin hold
R09	Shui Chuen O	New Seat	Lo Tak-ming (Ind) 50.15%	Tang Ka-piu (FTU/DAB) 49.63%	Lui Yick-fong (Ind) 0.22%	Independent gain new seat
R10	Jat Chuen	Yau Man-chun (Ind)	Yau Man-chun (Ind) 66.39%	Leung Ho-kai (NPP/CF) 33.61%		Independent hold
R11	Chun Fung	Chan Nok-hang (Civ)	Chan Nok-hang (Civ) 68.10%	Ngai Chi-wai (CF) 31.29%	Lee Sze-wing (Ind) 0.62%	Civic hold
R12	Sun Tin Wai	Ching Cheung-ying (DP)	Ching Cheung-ying (DP) 60.61%	Ho Wai-chun (FTU) 39.39%		Democratic hold
R13	Chui Tin	Hui Yui-yu (Ind)	Hui Yui-yu (Ind) 64.97%	Lam Yuk-wa (Ind) 35.03%		Independent hold
R14	Hin Ka	Lam Chung-yan (CF)	Chan Wang-tung (Ind) 43.26% Cheung Yu-tim (Ind) 17.38%	Lam Chung-yan (CF) 35.53%	Bonnie Tze Yuk-mui (Ind) 2.83% Luen Kwok-fai (Ind) 1.00%	Independent gain from Civil Force
R15	Lower Shing Mun	Tong Hok-leung (NPP/CF)	Ken Wong Ho-fung (CST) 55.49%	Tong Hok-leung (CF/NPP) 44.51%		Community Sha Tin gain from NPP/CF
R16	Wan Shing	Ho Hau-cheung (NPP/CF)	Cheung Hing-wa (ND) 56.68% Cheung Tak-wing (2047HKM) 3.11%	Law Kin-kan (CF/NPP) 40.21%		Neo Democrats gain from NPP/CF
R17	Keng Hau	Ng Kam-hung (Ind)	Ng Kam-hung (Ind) 60.11%	Cheung Pak-yuen (NPP/CF) 37.95% Lok Chung-yau (Ind) 1.94%		Independent hold
R18	Tin Sum	Pun Kwok-shan (NPP/CF)	Tsang Kit (Ind) 52.48%	Pun Kwok-shan (NPP/CF) 47.52%		Independent gain from NPP/CF
R19	Chui Ka	Li Sai-hung (Ind)	Li Sai-hung (Ind) 58.68% Oscar Lo Chun-man (Ind) 0.40%	Lam Yu-sing (CF/NPP) 40.92%		Independent hold
R20	Tai Wai	Tung Kin-lei (DAB)	Kudama Ng Ting-lam (DP/PfD) 46.06% Owen Chow Ka-shing (Ind) 8.21%	Tung Kin-lei (DAB) 45.14%	Yuen Kwai-hei (ASEA) 0.59%	Democratic gain from DAB
R21	Chung Tin	Wong Hok-lai (STCN)	Wong Hok-lai (CST) 60.51%	Yiu Ho-yee (DAB) 39.49%		Community Sha Tin hold
R22	Sui Wo	Thomas Pang Cheung-wai (DAB)	Mak Tsz-kin (Civ) 58.47%	Chan Tan-tan (DAB) 41.53%		Civic gain from DAB
R23	Fo Tan	Scarlett Pong Oi-lan (Ind)	Lui Kai-wing (Civ) 56.65%	Scarlett Pong Oi-lan (Ind) 43.35%		Civic gain from Independent
R24	Chun Ma	Siu Hin-hong (Ind)	Felix Chow Hiu-laam (DP/PfD) 50.43%	Siu Hin-hong (Ind) 26.17% Ho Wai-lok (LP) 23.39%		Democratic gain from Independent
R25	Hoi Nam	New Seat	Chan Pui-ming (Civ) 65.15%	Natasha Yu (Ind) 34.85%		Civic gain new seat
R26	Chung On	Yip Wing (Lab)	Yip Wing (Lab) 60.92%	Kung Mei-chi (DAB) 39.08%		Labour hold
R27	Kam To	James Chan Kwok-keung (Ind)	Hui Lap-san (Ind) 39.61% Mio Chan Tin-chun (Ind) 20.40%	Ng Kai-tai (DAB) 38.99%	Ng Chi-hung (Ind) 1.01%	Independent gain from Independent
R28	Ma On Shan Town Centre	Alvin Lee Chi-wing (Ind)	Chung Lai-him (Ind) 60.54% Yau Man-king (Ind) 2.11% Ng Wai-ling (Ind) 0.47%	Alvin Lee Chi-wing (Ind) 35.62% Lee Kai-hung (Ind) 1.26%		Independent gain from Independent
R29	Wu Kai Sha	Li Wing-shing (Ind)	Li Wing-shing (Ind) 60.51% Anderson Choi Kai-hang (Ind) 3.63%	Ng Cheuk-king (DAB) 35.86%		Independent hold
R30	Lee On	Chris Mak Yun-pui (Ind)	Chris Mak Yun-pui (Ind) 65.61%	Li Lam-cheong (Ind) 33.43%	Kwan Yu-fung (Ind) 0.96%	Independent hold
R31	Fu Lung	Tsang So-lai (DP)	Tsang So-lai (DP) 62.83%	Michael Liu Tsz-chung (NPP/CF) 37.17%		Democratic hold
R32	Kam Ying	Ting Tsz-yuen (Ind)	Ting Tsz-yuen (CST) 53.46%	Choi Wai-shing (DAB) 38.08%	Lee Kin-hang (Ind) 5.93% Law Siu-chung (Ind) 2.53%	Community Sha Tin hold
R33	Yiu On	Li Sai-wing (DAB)	Sin Cheuk-nam (DP/PfD) 61.50%	Li Sai-wing (DAB/NTAS) 38.50%		Democratic/PfD gain from DAB/NTAS
R34	Heng On	Cheng Tsuk-man (DP)	Cheng Tsuk-man (DP) 63.22%	Fang Hao-liang (FTU) 36.78%		Democratic hold
R35	Tai Shui Hang	Michael Yung Ming-chau (Civ)	Michael Yung Ming-chau (Civ) 58.72%	Chu Wun-chiu (DAB) 41.28%		Civic hold
R36	On Tai	Chiu Man-leung (DAB)	Cheng Chung-hang (Ind) 57.88% Leroy Tong Chi-pui (Ind) 0.69%	Chiu Man-leung (DAB) 41.43%		Independent gain from DAB
R37	Yu Yan	Yiu Ka-chun (NPP/CF)	Lo Yuet-chau (STCV/PfD) 56.73%	Yiu Ka-chun (CF/NPP) 43.27%		STCV/PfD gain from NPP/CF
R38	Di Yee	New Seat	Tse Kit-wing (CST) 37.70% Liu Qing (DP) 18.78%	Lam Kong-kwan (DAB) 43.52%		DAB win new seat
R39	Bik Woo	Wong Ping-fan (DAB)	Luk Tsz-tung (Civ) 55.32%	Wong Ping-fan (DAB) 44.68%		Civic gain from DAB
R40	Kwong Hong	Wong Fu-sang (DAB)	Ricardo Liao Pak-hong (PfD) 57.32%	Wong Fu-sang (DAB) 35.79% Paul Choi Chun-chiu (Ind) 6.90%		PfD gain from DAB
R41	Kwong Yuen	Chan Man-kuen (NPP/CF)	Yeung Sze-kin (PfD) 57.74%	Chan Man-kuen (CF/NPP) 42.26%		PfD gain from NPP/CF

=== Kwai Tsing ===
Code	Constituency	Incumbent	Pro-democracy Candidate(s)	Pro-Beijing Candidate(s)	Other Candidate(s)	Results
S01	Kwai Hing	Leung Chi-shing (NWSC)	Leung Chi-shing (NWSC) 71.50%	Lee Wai-lok (FTU) 28.50%		NWSC hold
S02	Kwai Luen	New Seat	Ng Kim-sing (DP) 57.11%	Lok Siu-luen (Ind) 42.27%	Wu Pik-lung (Ind) 0.63%	Democratic gain new seat
S03	Kwai Shing East Estate	Rayman Chow Wai-hung (Ind)	Rayman Chow Wai-hung (PfD) 62.63%	Ng Chi-wah (DAB) 36.62%	Cherrie Lai Chung-yan (Ind) 0.74%	PfD hold
S04	Upper Tai Wo Hau	Hui Kei-cheung (DP)	Hui Kei-cheung (DP) 57.21%	Chan On-ni (FTU) 42.79%		Democratic hold
S05	Lower Tai Wo Hau	Wong Bing-kuen (DP)	Wong Bing-kuen (DP) 69.73%	Huang Si-hong (FTU) 30.27%		Democratic hold
S06	Kwai Chung Estate South	Wong Yun-tat (Ind)	Wong Yun-tat (PfD) 55.60%	Lee Wang-fung (DAB) 43.06%	Cheung Ching-hing (Ind) 1.34%	PfD hold
S07	Kwai Chung Estate North	Leung Kam-wai (Ind)	Leung Kam-wai (PfD) 57.86%	Leung Kong-ming (DAB) 41.71%	Guo Sanquan (Ind) 0.43%	PfD hold
S08	Shek Yam	Li Sai-lung (DAB)	Andrew Wan Siu-kin (DP) 56.73%	Li Sai-lung (DAB) 43.27%		Democratic gain from DAB
S09	Tai Pak Tin West	New Seat (previously Tai Pak Tin)	Szeto Kong-sun (Ind) 41.30% Ho Cheuk-wai (Ind) 10.67%	Kwok Fu-yung (DAB) 48.03%		DAB gain new seat
S10	Tai Pak Tin East	New Seat	Lau Kwai-mui (DP) 53.92%	Lillian Kwok Ling-lai (DAB) 44.72% Lau Hin-ming (Ind) 1.36%		Democratic gain new seat
S11	On Yam	Dennis Leung Tsz-wing (FTU)	Leung Wing-kuen (DP) 52.01%	Dennis Leung Tsz-wing (FTU) 47.99%		Democratic gain from FTU
S12	Shek Lei North	Lam Siu-fai (DP)	Lam Siu-fai (DP) 62.36%	Yuen Yun-hung (DAB) 37.64%		Democratic hold
S13	Shek Lei South	Ng Ka-chiu (RT)	Leung Kwok-wah (DP) 58.93%	Ng Ka-chiu (RT) 41.07%		Democratic gain from Roundtable
S14	Kwai Fong	Leung Yiu-chung (NWSC)	Leung Yiu-chung (NWSC) 59.10%	Lam Ying-wai (DAB) 37.17%	Tsang Tsz-lun (Ind) 3.73%	NWSC hold
S15	Hing Fong	Ng Kim-sing (DP)	Tong Ho-man (DP) 58.47%	Tang Lai-ling (DAB) 41.04%	Wong Hon-chi (Ind) 0.49%	Democratic hold
S16	Wah Lai	Wong Yiu-chung (BPA)	Sin Chung-kai (DP) 51.93% Tam Yam-chi (Ind) 2.28%	Wong Yiu-chung (BPA) 44.88% Yuen Kwok-ki (Ind) 0.66% Christabel Donna Tai Pui-shan (Ind) 0.25%		Democratic gain from BPA
S17	Lai Wah	Chu Lai-ling (DAB)	Steve Cheung Kwan-kiu (Civ/PfD) 56.18%	Chu Lai-ling (DAB) 43.82%		Civic/PfD gain from DAB
S18	Cho Yiu	Pau Ming-hong (DAB)	Choi Nga-man (Ind) 51.48%	Pau Ming-hong (DAB) 48.52%		Independent gain from DAB
S19	Lai King	Chow Yick-hay (Ind)	Wong Tin-yan (Ind) 51.51%	Chow Yick-hay (Ind) 48.49%		Independent gain from Independent
S20	Kwai Shing West Estate	Lau Mei-lo (FTU)	Leung Ching-shan (NWSC) 57.15%	Lau Mei-lo (FTU) 42.85%		NWSC gain from FTU
S21	On Ho	Tam Wai-chun (BPA)	Warren Tam Ka-chun (Civ) 59.57%	Tam Wai-chun (BPA) 38.22%	So Chi-shing (Ind) 1.59% Ng Ka-fai (Ind) 0.62%	Civic gain from BPA
S22	Wai Ying	Alice Mak Mei-kuen (FTU)	Sin Ho-fai (Civ) 59.88%	Alice Mak Mei-kuen (FTU) 40.12%		Civic gain from FTU
S23	Tsing Yi Estate	Simon Chan Siu-man (Ind)	Wong Pit-man (TYP/PfD) 59.68%	Simon Chan Siu-man (Ind) 40.32%		Tsing Yi People/PfD gain from Independent
S24	Greenfield	Clarice Cheung Wai-ching (Ind)	Wong Chun-tat (Ind) 52.52%	Philip Tam Sai-wah (Ind) 18.44%	Clarice Cheung Wai-ching (Ind) 29.04%	Independent gain from Independent
S25	Cheung Ching	Alan Lee Chi-keung (BPA)	Hon Chun-yin (DP/PfD) 57.57%	Alan Lee Chi-keung (BPA) 42.43%		Democratic/PfD gain from BPA
S26	Cheung Hong	Tsui Hiu-kit (RT)	Wong Chun-lam (Ind) 46.25%	Tsui Hiu-kit (RT) 53.75%		Roundtable hold
S27	Shing Hong	Leung Wai-man (DAB)	Lucia Chiu Po-kam (PfD/DA) 49.18%	Leung Kar-ming (DAB) 50.82%		DAB hold
S28	Tsing Yi South	Poon Chi-shing (DAB)	Kwok Tsz-kin (PfD) 54.46%	Poon Chi-shing (DAB) 45.54%		Independent gain from DAB
S29	Cheung Hang	Lo Yuen-ting (DAB)	Yim Ho-yuen (Civ Passion) 46.52%	Lo Yuen-ting (DAB) 53.48%		DAB hold
S30	Ching Fat	Nancy Poon Siu-ping (Ind)	Lau Chi-kit (DP) 56.55%	Lam Chui-ling (Ind) 38.75%	Wong Pui-shan (Ind) 3.03% Chau Hon-sum (Ind) 1.34% Ho Wing-chi (Ind) 0.32%	Democratic gain from Independent
S31	Cheung On	Law King-shing (DAB)	Cheung Man-lung (PfD) 53.14%	Law King-shing (DAB) 42.72%	Tong Yik-chun (Ind) 4.14%	PfD gain from DAB

=== Islands ===
Code	Constituency	Incumbent	Pro-democracy Candidate(s)	Pro-Beijing Candidate(s)	Other Candidate(s)	Results
T01	Lantau	Randy Yu Hon-kwan (Ind)	Fung Siu-tin (PfD) 47.64% Ho Yan-ching (Ind) 0.38%	Randy Yu Hon-kwan (Ind) 51.98%		Independent hold
T02	Mun Yat	Kwok Ping (Ind)	Kwok Ping (Ind) 67.62%	Wong Chun-kit (FTU/DAB) 32.38%		Independent hold
T03	Yat Tung Estate North	Tang Ka-piu (DAB/FTU)	Fong Lung-fei (PfD) 61.80%	Lau Chin-pang (FTU/DAB) 38.20%		PfD gain from DAB/FTU
T04	Tung Chung South	Holden Chow Ho-ding (DAB)	Sheep Wong Chun-yeung (Ind) 56.49%	Holden Chow Ho-ding (DAB) 40.49%	Andy Lai Wing-on (Ind) 2.05% Lau Wing-yin (Ind) 0.97%	Independent gain from DAB
T05	Tung Chung Central	New Seat	Lee Ka-ho (Civ/PfD) 53.44%	Sammi Fu Hiu-lam (NPP) 46.56%		Civic/PfD gain new seat
T06	Tung Chung North	Sammi Fu Hiu-lam (NPP)	Sammy Tsui Sang-hung (DP) 39.56%	Yip Pui-kei (DAB) 31.04% Poon Chun-yan (RT) 29.40%		Democratic gain from NPP
T07	Discovery Bay	Amy Yung Wing-sheung (Civ)	Amy Yung Wing-sheung (Civ/PfD) 64.67%	Jonathan Chow Yuen-kuk (Ind) 35.33%		Civic/PfD hold
T08	Peng Chau & Hei Ling Chau	Josephine Tsang Sau-ho (Ind)	Tsui Yat-long (Ind) 42.17%	Josephine Tsang Sau-ho (Ind) 57.83%		Independent hold
T09	Lamma & Po Toi	Yu Lai-fan (DAB)	Caan Chui Jing-ching (PfD) 49.22%	Lau Shun-ting (DAB) 50.78%		DAB hold
T10	Cheung Chau	New Seat (merging from Cheung Chau South & Cheung Chau North)	Leung Kwok-ho (Ind) 61.40%	Mealoha Kwok Wai-man (DAB) 38.60%		Independent gain new seat

== See also ==
- 2019 Hong Kong local elections
