= Tsui Hing (constituency) =

Hong Kong constituency

- 翠興
- Elected constituency for the Tuen Mun District Council
- Boundary of Tsui Hing in Tuen Mun District
- District: Tuen Mun
- Legislative Council constituency: New Territories North West
- Population: 18,150 (2019)
- Electorate: 13,349 (2019)

Current constituency
- Created: 1999
- Number of members: One
- Member: Vacant

Tsui Hing (Chinese: 翠興) is one of the 31 constituencies in the Tuen Mun District.

Created for the 1999 District Council elections, the constituency returns one district councillor to the Tuen Mun District Council, with an election every four years.

Tsui Hing loosely covers areas surrounding Chelsea Heights, Greenland Garden, Hong Tak Gardens and Tai Hing Gardens in Tuen Mun with an estimated population of 18,150.

== Councillors represented ==
Election	Member	Party
1999	Chu Yiu-wah	Independent
201?	Chu Yiu-wah	NPP
2017	Chu Yiu-wah	Roundtable
2019	Poon Chi-kin→Vacant	TMCN

== Election results ==
=== 2010s ===
Tuen Mun District Council Election, 2019: Tsui Hing
Party	Candidate	Votes	%	±%
TMCN	Poon Chi-kin	4,662	60.62	
Roundtable	Chu Yiu-wah	3,028	39.38	
Majority		1,634	21.24	
Turnout		7,716	75.74	
TMCN gain from Roundtable		Swing		

Tuen Mun District Council Election, 2015: Tsui Hing
Party	Candidate	Votes	%	±%
NPP	Chu Yiu-wah	Uncontested		
NPP hold		Swing		

Tuen Mun District Council Election, 2011: Tsui Hing
Party	Candidate	Votes	%	±%
Independent	Chu Yiu-wah	1,895	61.73	
Democratic	Ng Siu-hong	1,175	38.27	
Majority		720	23.46	
Turnout		3,070	38.24	
Independent hold		Swing		

=== 2000s ===
Tuen Mun District Council Election, 2007: Tsui Hing
Party	Candidate	Votes	%	±%
Independent	Chu Yiu-wah	Uncontested		
Independent hold		Swing		

Tuen Mun District Council Election, 2003: Tsui Hing
Party	Candidate	Votes	%	±%
Independent	Chu Yiu-wah	1,987	69.94	
Independent	Li Tsau-ha	854	30.06	
Majority		1,133	39.88	
Independent hold		Swing		

=== 1990s ===
Tuen Mun District Council Election, 1999: Tsui Hing
Party	Candidate	Votes	%	±%
Independent	Chu Yiu-wah	Uncontested		
Independent win (new seat)				
