= Yuen Long Tung Tau (constituency) =

Hong Kong constituency

- 元朗東頭
- Elected constituency for the Yuen Long District Council
- Boundary of Yuen Long Tung Tau in Yuen Long District
- District: Yuen Long
- Legislative Council constituency: New Territories North West
- Population: 13,186 (2019)
- Electorate: 5,130 (2019)

Current constituency
- Created: 2019
- Number of members: One
- Member: Vacant
- Created from: Pek Long, Yuen Long Centre

Yuen Long Tung Tau (Chinese: 元朗東頭) is one of the 39 constituencies in the Yuen Long District.

Created for the 2019 District Council elections, the constituency returns one district councillor to the Yuen Long District Council, with an election every four years.

Yuen Long Tung Tau loosely covers areas surrounding Tung Tau Industrial Area in Yuen Long. It has projected population of 13,186.

== Councillors represented ==
Election	Member	Party
2019	Lam Ting-wai→Vacant	Democratic

== Election results ==
=== 2010s ===
Yuen Long District Council Election, 2019: Yuen Long Tung Tau
Party	Candidate	Votes	%	±%
Democratic	Lam Ting-wai	2,377	59.56	
DAB	Riben Li Kai-lap	1,614	40.44	
Majority		763	19.12	
Turnout		4,001	78.04	
Democratic win (new seat)				
