= Yuet Wu (constituency) =

Hong Kong electoral district

- 悅湖
- Elected constituency for the Tuen Mun District Council
- Boundary of Yuet Wu in Tuen Mun District
- District: Tuen Mun
- Legislative Council constituency: New Territories North West
- Population: 13,428 (2019)
- Electorate: 9,099 (2019)

Current constituency
- Created: 1999
- Number of members: One
- Member: Cheung Hang-fai (DAB)

Yuet Wu (Chinese: 悅湖) is one of the 31 constituencies in the Tuen Mun District.

Created for the 1999 District Council elections, the constituency returns one district councillor to the Tuen Mun District Council, with an election every four years.

Yuet Wu loosely covers areas surrounding Tuen Mun Wu Hong Police Quarters and Yuet Wu Villa in Tuen Mun with an estimated population of 13,428.

== Councillors represented ==
Election	Member	Party
1999	Kwun Tung-wing	ADPL
2007	Cheung Hang-fai	DAB
2019	Ian Wong Hung-ming	ADPL

== Election results ==
=== 2010s ===
Tuen Mun District Council Election, 2019: Shan King
Party	Candidate	Votes	%	±%
ADPL	Ian Wong Hung-ming	4,419	63.35	
DAB	Cheung Hang-fai	2,415	34.62	
Nonpartisan	Kwun Tung-wing	141	2.02	
Majority		2,004	28.73	
Turnout		6,996	76.89	
ADPL gain from DAB		Swing		
