= Cheung Hong (constituency) =

Hong Kong constituency

- Elected constituency for the Kwai Tsing District Council
- Boundary of Cheung Hong in Kwai Tsing District
- District: Kwai Tsing
- Legislative Council constituency: New Territories South West
- Population: 14,099 (2019)
- Electorate: 9,326 (2019)

Current constituency
- Created: 1994
- Number of members: One
- Member: Tsui Hiu-kit (Roundtable)

Cheung Hong (Chinese: 長康) is one of the 31 constituencies of the Kwai Tsing District Council in Hong Kong. The seat elects one member of the council every four years. It was first created in the 1994 elections. Its boundary is loosely based on part of Cheung Hong Estate and Ching Wah Court in Tsing Yi with estimated population of 14,099.

== Councillors represented ==
Election	Member	Party
1994	Ting Yin-wah	ADPL/TYCG
199?	Ting Yin-wah	Nonpartisan
2007	Jonathan Tsui Hiu-kit	Independent
201?	Jonathan Tsui Hiu-kit	NPP
2017	Jonathan Tsui Hiu-kit	Roundtable

== Election results ==
=== 2010s ===
Kwai Tsing District Council Election, 2019: Cheung Hong
Party	Candidate	Votes	%	±%
Roundtable	Jonathan Tsui Hiu-kit	3,427	53.75	
Nonpartisan	Wong Chun-lam	2,949	46.25	
Majority		478	7.50	
Turnout		6,398	68.63	
Roundtable hold		Swing		
