= Leung King (constituency) =

Hong Kong constituency

- 良景
- Elected constituency for the Tuen Mun District Council
- Boundary of Leung King in Tuen Mun District
- District: Tuen Mun
- Legislative Council constituency: New Territories North West
- Population: 12,881 (2019)
- Electorate: 10,366 (2019)

Current constituency
- Created: 1994
- Number of members: One
- Member: Vacant

Leung King (Chinese: 良景) is one of the 31 constituencies in the Tuen Mun District.

Created for the 1994 District Board elections, the constituency returns one district councillor to the Tuen Mun District Council, with an election held every four years.

Leung King loosely covers areas surrounding Siu Ling Court and part of Leung King Estate in Tuen Mun, with an estimated population of 12,881.

== Councillors represented ==
Election	Member	Party
2019	Wong Tak-yuen→Vacant	TMCN

== Election results ==
=== 2010s ===
Tuen Mun District Council Election, 2019: Shan King
Party	Candidate	Votes	%	±%
TMCN	Wong Tak-yuen	4,073	57.59	
DAB	Ching Chi-hung	2,697	38.13	
Civic Passion	Tang Man-kit	303	4.28	
Majority		1,376	19.46	
Turnout		7,082	68.37	
TMCN gain from DAB		Swing		
