= Ting Sham (constituency) =

- Elected constituency for the Tsuen Wan District Council
- Boundary of Ting Sham in Tsuen Wan District
- District: Tsuen Wan
- Legislative Council constituency: New Territories South West
- Population: 17,611 (2019)
- Electorate: 8,513 (2019)

Current constituency
- Created: 2015
- Number of members: One
- Member: Vacant
- Created from: Lai Hing

Ting Sham (Chinese: 汀深) is one of the 18 constituencies in the Tsuen Wan District of Hong Kong which was created in 2015.

The constituency loosely covers the Sham Tseng Village and Ting Kau with the estimated population of 17,611.

== Councillors represented ==
Election	Member	Party
2015	Cheng Chit-pun	NPP
2017	Cheng Chit-pun	Roundtable
2019	Lau Chi-hung→Vacant	Nonpartisan

== Election results ==
=== 2010s ===
Tsuen Wan District Council Election, 2019: Ting Sham
Party	Candidate	Votes	%	±%
Roundtable	Wyran Cheng Chit-pun	2,931	44.50	
Nonpartisan	Lau Chi-hung	3,489	52.97	
Nonpartisan	Brian Lam	149	2.26	
Nonpartisan	Samuel Wong Chuen-lun	18	0.27	
Majority		558	8.47	
Turnout				
Nonpartisan win (new seat)				

Tsuen Wan District Council Election, 2015: Ting Sham
Party	Candidate	Votes	%	±%
NPP	Wyran Cheng Chit-pun	1,799	46.6	
Labour	Ha Hei-lok	1,606	41.6	
Nonpartisan	Cheng Shing-lung	454	11.8	
Majority		193	5.0	
Turnout		3,901	56.2	
NPP win (new seat)				
