= Siu Chi (constituency) =

Constituency in Tuen Mun, Hong Kong

- 兆置
- Elected constituency for the Tuen Mun District Council
- Boundary of Siu Chi in Tuen Mun District
- District: Tuen Mun
- Legislative Council constituency: New Territories North West
- Population: 19,954 (2019)
- Electorate: 11,868 (2019)

Current constituency
- Created: 1994
- Number of members: One
- Member: Lam Chung-hoi (Independent)

Siu Chi (Chinese: 兆置) is one of the 31 constituencies in the Tuen Mun District.

Created for the 1994 District Board elections, the constituency returns one district councillor to the Tuen Mun District Council, with an election every four years.

Siu Chi loosely covers areas surrounding Siu On Court and Chi Lok Fai Yuen in Tuen Mun with an estimated population of 19,954.

== Councillors represented ==
Election	Member	Party
1994	Chan Kan-kam	Democratic
1999	Lam Chung-hoi	Democratic
2020	Lam Chung-hoi	Independent

== Election results ==
=== 2010s ===
Tuen Mun District Council Election, 2019: Siu Chi
Party	Candidate	Votes	%	±%
Democratic	Lam Chung-hoi	5,798	78.13	+11.32
Nonpartisan	Wong Ka-leung	1,623	21.87	
Majority		4,175	56.26	
Turnout		7,572	63.81	
Democratic hold		Swing		

Tuen Mun District Council Election, 2015: Siu Chi
Party	Candidate	Votes	%	±%
Democratic	Lam Chung-hoi	3,551	66.81	−7.98
DAB	Li Ching-yee	1,532	28.82	
Independent	Wong Ka-leung	232	4.37	−1.86
Majority		2,019	37.99	
Turnout		5,315	48.05	
Democratic hold		Swing		

Tuen Mun District Council Election, 2011: Siu Chi
Party	Candidate	Votes	%	±%
Democratic	Lam Chung-hoi	2,854	74.79	+2.88
Independent	Tiger Law Yiu-chun	648	16.98	
Independent	Wong Ka-leung	314	8.23	+1.52
Majority		2,206	5.26	
Turnout		3,816	35.96	
Democratic hold		Swing		

=== 2000s ===
Tuen Mun District Council Election, 2007: Siu Chi
Party	Candidate	Votes	%	±%
Democratic	Lam Chung-hoi	2,690	71.91	−13.36
DAB	Liu Chun-kuen	800	21.38	
Independent	Wong Ka-leung	251	6.71	−8.02
Majority		1,890	50.53	
Democratic hold		Swing		

Tuen Mun District Council Election, 2003: Siu Chi
Party	Candidate	Votes	%	±%
Democratic	Lam Chung-hoi	2,819	85.27	+16.25
Independent	Wong Ka-leung	487	14.73	
Majority		2,332	70.54	
Democratic hold		Swing		

=== 1990s ===
Tuen Mun District Council Election, 1999: Siu Chi
Party	Candidate	Votes	%	±%
Democratic	Lam Chung-hoi	1,388	69.02	+7.38
DAB	Wong Chan-fat	623	30.98	
Majority		765	18.04	
Democratic hold		Swing		

Tuen Mun District Board Election, 1994: Siu Chi
Party	Candidate	Votes	%	±%
Democratic	Chan Kan-kam	1,477	61.64	
ADPL	Lee Yiu-hung	918	38.33	
Majority		559	23.31	
Democratic win (new seat)				
