= Shan King (constituency) =

Hong Kong constituency

- 山景
- Elected constituency for the Tuen Mun District Council
- Boundary of Shan King in Tuen Mun District
- District: Tuen Mun
- Legislative Council constituency: New Territories North West
- Population: 16,817 (2019)
- Electorate: 11,279 (2019)

Current constituency
- Created: 1988
- Number of members: One
- Member: Wong Tan-ching (TMCN)

Shan King (Chinese: 山景) is one of the 31 constituencies in the Tuen Mun District.

Created for the 1988 District Board elections for the first time and 2003 District Council elections for the second time, the constituency returns one district councillor to the Tuen Mun District Council, with an election every four years.

Shan King loosely covers areas surrounding Shan King Estate in Tuen Mun with an estimated population of 16,817.

== Councillors represented ==
=== 1988 to 1994 ===
Election	First Member	First Party	Second Member	Second Party
1988	Yim Tin-sang	ADPL	Lee Yiu-hung	Independent
19??	Yim Tin-sang	ADPL	Lee Yiu-hung	TMP

=== 1994 to present ===
Election	Member	Party
1994	Chan Yiu-fat	ADPL
1999	Constituency abolished	
2003	Ng Koon-hung	Independent
2019	Wong Tan-ching	TMCN

== Election results ==
=== 2010s ===
Tuen Mun District Council Election, 2019: Shan King
Party	Candidate	Votes	%	±%
TMCN	Wong Tan-ching	4,780	64.31	
Independent	Ng Koon-hung	2,653	35.69	−17.90
Majority		2,127	28.62	
Turnout		7,457	66.18	
TMCN gain from Independent		Swing		

Tuen Mun District Council Election, 2015: Shan King
Party	Candidate	Votes	%	±%
Independent	Ng Koon-hung	1,853	53.59	−21.65
TMC	Hon Lai-yin	1,605	46.41	
Majority		248	7.18	
Turnout		3,458	57.69	
Independent hold		Swing		

Tuen Mun District Council Election, 2011: Shan King
Party	Candidate	Votes	%	±%
Independent	Ng Koon-hung	2,373	75.24	+1.62
Independent	Leung Man-pun	781	24.76	−1.62
Majority		1,592	50.48	
Turnout		3,154	29.70	
Independent hold		Swing		

=== 2000s ===
Tuen Mun District Council Election, 2007: Shan King
Party	Candidate	Votes	%	±%
Independent	Ng Koon-hung	2,252	63.62	−9.27
Independent	Leung Man-pun	1,288	36.38	
Majority		964	7.24	
Independent hold		Swing		

Tuen Mun District Council Election, 2003: Shan King
Party	Candidate	Votes	%	±%
Independent	Ng Koon-hung	2,278	54.35	
ADPL	Law Hau-king	1,589	37.91	
Independent	Yau Siu-leung	324	7.73	
Majority		689	16.44	
Independent win (new seat)				

=== 1990s ===
Tuen Mun District Board Election, 1994: Shan King
Party	Candidate	Votes	%	±%
ADPL	Chan Yiu-fat	793	45.86	+3.01
123DA	Lau Chan-kwong	473	27.36	
NTWRA	Chan Yin-kwan	463	26.78	+12.43
Majority		320	18.50	
ADPL hold		Swing		

Tuen Mun District Board Election, 1991: Shan King
Party	Candidate	Votes	%	±%
ADPL	Yim Tin-sang	3,559	42.85	−5.07
TMP	Lee Yiu-hung	2,786	33.55	−2.60
Independent	Chan Yin-kwan	1,192	14.35	−1.58
LDF	Ng Koon-hung	768	9.25	
ADPL hold		Swing		
Independent hold		Swing		

=== 1980s ===
Tuen Mun District Board Election, 1988: Shan King
Party	Candidate	Votes	%	±%
ADPL	Yim Tin-sang	2,747	47.92	
Independent	Lee Yiu-hung	2,072	36.15	
Independent	Chan Yin-kwan	913	15.93	
ADPL win (new seat)				
Independent win (new seat)				
