= King Hing (constituency) =

Hong Kong constituency

- 景興
- Elected constituency for the Tuen Mun District Council
- Boundary of King Hing in Tuen Mun District
- District: Tuen Mun
- Legislative Council constituency: New Territories North West
- Population: 14,921 (2019)
- Electorate: 11,279 (2019)

Current constituency
- Created: 1994
- Number of members: One
- Member: Chan Yau-hoi (FTU)

King Hing (Chinese: 景興), previously Tai Hing South, is one of the 31 constituencies in the Tuen Mun District.

Created for the 1994 District Board elections, the constituency returns one district councillor to the Tuen Mun District Council, with an election every four years.

King Hing loosely covers areas surrounding part of Shan King Estate and part of Tai Hang Estate in Tuen Mun with an estimated population of 14,921.

== Councillors represented ==
Election	Member	Party
1994	Tony Chan Yau-hoi	DAB
2012	Tony Chan Yau-hoi	FTU

== Election results ==
=== 2010s ===
Tuen Mun District Council Election, 2019: King Hing
Party	Candidate	Votes	%	±%
FTU	Tony Chan Yau-hoi	2,893	50.28	
TMCN	Law Cheuk-yung	2,756	47.90	
Independent	Lau Hang-yi	105	1.82	
Majority		137	2.38	
Turnout		5,782	67.16	
FTU hold		Swing		
