= Tai Pak Tin East (constituency) =

Constituency in Kwai Tsing, Hong Kong

- 大白田東
- Elected constituency for the Kwai Tsing District Council
- Boundary of Tai Pak Tin East in Kwai Tsing District
- District: Kwai Tsing
- Legislative Council constituency: New Territories South West
- Population: 16,560 (2019)
- Electorate: 7,858 (2019)

Current constituency
- Created: 2019
- Number of members: One
- Member: Lau Kwai-mui (Democratic)
- Created from: Shek Yam, Tai Pak Tin

Tai Pak Tin East (Chinese: 大白田東) is one of the 31 constituencies in the Kwai Tsing District of Hong Kong.

Created for the 2019 District Council elections, the constituency sends one district councillor to the Kwai Tsing District Council, with an election every four years.

Tai Pak Tin East loosely covers area surrounding Shek Lei (II) Estate in Kwai Chung. It has an estimated population of 16,560.

== Councillors represented ==
Election	Member	Party
2019	Lau Kwai-mui	Democratic

== Election results ==
=== 2010s ===
Kwai Tsing District Council Election, 2019: Tai Pak Tin East
Party	Candidate	Votes	%	±%
Democratic	Lau Kwai-mui	2,902	53.92	
DAB	Lillian Kwok Ling-lai	2,407	44.72	
Nonpartisan	Lau Hin-ming	73	1.36	
Majority		495	9.20	
Turnout		5,400	68.75	
Democratic win (new seat)				
