= Hanford (constituency) =

Hong Kong constituency

- Elected constituency for the Tuen Mun District Council
- Boundary of Hanford in Tuen Mun District
- District: Tuen Mun
- Legislative Council constituency: New Territories North West
- Population: 14,473 (2019)
- Electorate: 8,022 (2019)

Current constituency
- Created: 2003
- Number of members: One
- Member: Vacant
- Created from: Sam Shing; Tsui Fook

Hanford (Chinese: 恆福) is one of the 31 constituencies in the Tuen Mun District.

Created for the 2003 District Council elections, the constituency returns one district councillor to the Tuen Mun District Council, with an election every four years.

Hanford loosely covers areas surrounding Hanford Garden, Seaview Garden and Aegean Coast in Tuen Mun with an estimated population of 14,473.

== Councillors represented ==
Election	Member	Party
2003	Li Kwai-fong	Democratic
2004	Li Kwai-fong	Independent
2011	Beatrice Chu Shun-nga→Vacant	Democratic
2019	Beatrice Chu Shun-nga→Vacant	Independent

== Election results ==
=== 2010s ===
Tuen Mun District Council Election, 2019: Hanford
Party	Candidate	Votes	%	±%
Democratic	Beatrice Chu Shun-nga	3,857	66.07	+7.19
Nonpartisan	Fong Shun-yan	1,981	33.93	
Majority		1,876	32.14	
Turnout		5,860	73.05	
Democratic hold		Swing		

Tuen Mun District Council Election, 2015: Hanford
Party	Candidate	Votes	%	±%
Democratic	Beatrice Chu Shun-nga	2,597	58.88	+18.12
Independent	Ngai Ka-ho	1,021	23.15	
Independent	Li Kwai-fong	697	15.80	−16.31
Independent	Wong Chak-wah	96	2.18	
Majority		1,576	35.73	
Turnout		4,411	49.11	
Democratic hold		Swing		

Tuen Mun District Council Election, 2011: Hanford
Party	Candidate	Votes	%	±%
Democratic	Beatrice Chu Shun-nga	1,447	40.76	−7.61
Independent	Li Kwai-fong	1,140	32.11	−19.52
Independent	Keung Kai-pong	963	27.13	
Majority		307	8.65	
Turnout		3,550	44.60	
Democratic gain from Independent		Swing		

=== 2000s ===
Tuen Mun District Council Election, 2007: Hanford
Party	Candidate	Votes	%	±%
Independent	Li Kwai-fong	1,695	51.63	−21.51
Democratic	Beatrice Chu Shun-nga	1,588	48.37	
Majority		107	3.26	
Independent hold		Swing		

Tuen Mun District Council Election, 2003: Hanford
Party	Candidate	Votes	%	±%
Democratic	Li Kwai-fong	2,023	73.14	
Independent	Choi Lung-wai	743	26.86	
Majority		1,280	46.28	
Democratic win (new seat)				
