= Hing Tsak (constituency) =

Hong Kong constituency

- Elected constituency for the Tuen Mun District Council
- Boundary of Hing Tsak in Tuen Mun District
- District: Tuen Mun
- Legislative Council constituency: New Territories North West
- Population: 15,167 (2019)
- Electorate: 10,386 (2019)

Current constituency
- Created: 1994
- Number of members: One
- Member: Vacant

Hing Tsak (Chinese: 興澤), previously called Tai Hing North, is one of the 31 constituencies in the Tuen Mun District.

Created for the 1994 District Board elections, the constituency returns one district councillor to the Tuen Mun District Council, with an election every four years.

Hing Tsak loosely covers areas surrounding Affluence Garden and part of Tai Hang Estate in Tuen Mun with an estimated population of 15,167.

== Councillors represented ==
| Election | Member | Party |
|---|---|---|
| 1994 | Chan Man-wah | DAB |
| 1994 | Tsui Fan | DAB |
| 2012 | Tsui Fan | FTU |
| 2019 | Tsang Chun-hing→Vacant | TMCN |

== Election results ==
=== 2010s ===
Tuen Mun District Council Election, 2019: Hing Tsak
| Party | Candidate | Votes | % | ±% |
|---|---|---|---|---|
| TMCN | Tsang Chun-hing | 3,815 | 52.95 | |
| FTU | Tsui Fan | 3,390 | 47.05 | |
| Majority | | 425 | 5.10 | |
| Turnout | | 7,235 | 69.71 | |
| TMCN gain from FTU | | Swing | | |
