= Fu Sun (constituency) =

Hong Kong constituency in Tuen Mun district

- Elected constituency for the Tuen Mun District Council
- Boundary of Fu Sun in Tuen Mun District
- District: Tuen Mun
- Legislative Council constituency: New Territories North West
- Population: 18,387 (2019)
- Electorate: 12,232 (2019)

Current constituency
- Created: 1999
- Number of members: One
- Member: Vacant

Fu Sun (Chinese: 富新) is one of the 31 constituencies in the Tuen Mun District of Hong Kong.

Created for the 1999 District Council elections, the constituency returns one district councillor to the Tuen Mun District Council, with an election every four years.

Fu Sun loosely covers areas surrounding Glorious Garden and Sun Tuen Mun Centre in Tuen Mun with an estimated population of 18,387.

== Councillors represented ==
Election	Member	Party
2019	Lee Ka-wai→Vacant	Fu Sun Generation

== Election results ==
=== 2010s ===
Tuen Mun District Council Election, 2019: Fu Sun
Party	Candidate	Votes	%	±%
Fu Sun Generation	Lee Ka-wai	5,486	60.39	
NPP	Kam Man-fung	3,599	39.61	
Majority		1,887	20.78	
Turnout		9,114	74.52	
Fu Sun Generation gain from NPP		Swing		
