= On Ting (constituency) =

Hong Kong constituency

- 安定
- Elected constituency for the Tuen Mun District Council
- Boundary of On Ting in Tuen Mun District
- District: Tuen Mun
- Legislative Council constituency: New Territories North West
- Population: 15,819 (2019)
- Electorate: 10,705 (2019)

Current constituency
- Created: 1994
- Number of members: One
- Member: Kong Fung-yi (ADPL)

On Ting (Chinese: 安定) is one of the 31 constituencies in the Tuen Mun District.

Created for the 1994 District Board elections, the constituency returns one district councillor to the Tuen Mun District Council, with an election every four years.

On Ting loosely covers areas surrounding On Ting Estate and part of Siu Lun Court in Tuen Mun with an estimated population of 15,819.

== Councillors represented ==
Election	Member	Party
1994	Kong Fung-yi	ADPL

== Election results ==
=== 2010s ===
Tuen Mun District Council Election, 2019: On Ting
Party	Candidate	Votes	%	±%
ADPL	Kong Fung-yi	4,204	55.93	+4.11
FTU (DAB)	Ken Fung Pui-yin	3,313	44.07	−4.11
Majority		891	11.86	
Turnout		7,547	70.56	
ADPL hold		Swing		

Tuen Mun District Council Election, 2015: On Ting
Party	Candidate	Votes	%	±%
ADPL	Kong Fung-yi	2,383	51.82	−16.13
FTU	Ken Fung Pui-yin	2,216	48.18	+16.13
Majority		167	3.64	
Turnout		4,599	45.89	
ADPL hold		Swing		

Tuen Mun District Council Election, 2011: On Ting
Party	Candidate	Votes	%	±%
ADPL	Kong Fung-yi	2,639	67.95	+5.88
FTU (DAB)	Leung Chi-ho	1,245	32.05	−5.88
Majority		1,394	35.90	
Turnout		3,884	36.57	
ADPL hold		Swing		

=== 2000s ===
Tuen Mun District Council Election, 2007: On Ting
Party	Candidate	Votes	%	±%
ADPL	Kong Fung-yi	2,181	62.07	−8.18
DAB	Lee Wai-lam	1,333	37.93	+8.18
Majority		848	24.14	
ADPL hold		Swing		

Tuen Mun District Council Election, 2003: On Ting
Party	Candidate	Votes	%	±%
ADPL	Kong Fung-yi	2,914	70.25	+8.87
DAB	Chan Shiu-ling	1,234	29.75	−8.87
Majority		1,680	40.50	
ADPL hold		Swing		

=== 1990s ===
Tuen Mun District Council Election, 1999: On Ting
Party	Candidate	Votes	%	±%
ADPL	Kong Fung-yi	1,570	61.38	−2.19
DAB	Connie Tsang Yin-ling	988	38.62	
Majority		582	2.76	
ADPL hold		Swing		

Tuen Mun District Board Election, 1994: On Ting
Party	Candidate	Votes	%	±%
ADPL	Kong Fung-yi	1,368	63.57	
Nonpartisan	Lee Ying	784	36.43	
Majority		584	7.14	
ADPL win (new seat)				
