= Butterfly (constituency) =

Hong Kong constituency

- Elected constituency for the Tuen Mun District Council
- Boundary of Butterfly in Tuen Mun District
- District: Tuen Mun
- Legislative Council constituency: New Territories North West
- Population: 15,982 (2019)
- Electorate: 10,234 (2019)

Current constituency
- Created: 1991
- Number of members: One
- Member: Vacant

Butterfly (Chinese: 蝴蝶) is one of the 31 constituencies in the Tuen Mun District.

Created for the 1991 District Board elections, the constituency returns one district councillor to the Tuen Mun District Council, with an election every four years.

Butterfly loosely covers areas surrounding Butterfly Estate and Siu Shan Court in Tuen Mun with an estimated population of 15,982.

== Councillors represented ==
| Election | Member | Party |
|---|---|---|
| 1991 | Yeung Mei-kwong | TMP |
| 1994 | So Oi-kwan | NTWRA |
| 199? | So Oi-kwan | DAB |
| 2015 | Yeung Chi-hang→Vacant | ADPL |

== Election results ==
=== 2010s ===
Tuen Mun District Council Election, 2019: Butterfly
| Party | Candidate | Votes | % | ±% |
|---|---|---|---|---|
| ADPL | Yeung Chi-hang | 4,279 | 60.37 | +4.13 |
| DAB | Chung Kin-fung | 2,809 | 39.63 | −4.13 |
| Majority | | 1,470 | 30.74 | |
| Turnout | | 7,125 | 69.64 | |
| ADPL hold | | Swing | | |

Tuen Mun District Council Election, 2015: Butterfly
| Party | Candidate | Votes | % | ±% |
|---|---|---|---|---|
| ADPL | Yeung Chi-hang | 2,505 | 56.24 | |
| DAB | So Oi-kwan | 1,949 | 43.76 | −8.60 |
| Majority | | 556 | 12.48 | |
| Turnout | | 4,454 | 45.57 | |
| ADPL gain from DAB | | Swing | | |

Tuen Mun District Council Election, 2011: Butterfly
| Party | Candidate | Votes | % | ±% |
|---|---|---|---|---|
| DAB | So Oi-kwan | 1,934 | 52.36 | −2.05 |
| Nonpartisan | Tai Yin-chiu | 1,342 | 36.33 | |
| People Power | Wan Sui-kei | 418 | 11.32 | |
| Majority | | 592 | 16.03 | |
| Turnout | | 3,694 | 36.38 | |
| DAB hold | | Swing | | |

=== 2000s ===
Tuen Mun District Council Election, 2007: Butterfly
| Party | Candidate | Votes | % | ±% |
|---|---|---|---|---|
| DAB | So Oi-kwan | 2,097 | 54.41 | −6.59 |
| ADPL | Yeung Chi-hang | 1,757 | 45.59 | +6.59 |
| Majority | | 340 | 8.82 | |
| DAB hold | | Swing | | |

Tuen Mun District Council Election, 2003: Butterfly
| Party | Candidate | Votes | % | ±% |
|---|---|---|---|---|
| DAB | So Oi-kwan | 1,508 | 61.00 | |
| ADPL | Cheng Ka-lok | 964 | 39.00 | |
| Majority | | 544 | 22.00 | |
| DAB hold | | Swing | | |

=== 1990s ===
Tuen Mun District Council Election, 1999: Butterfly
| Party | Candidate | Votes | % | ±% |
|---|---|---|---|---|
| DAB | So Oi-kwan | Unopposed | | |
| DAB hold | | Swing | | |

Tuen Mun District Board Election, 1994: Butterfly
| Party | Candidate | Votes | % | ±% |
|---|---|---|---|---|
| NTWRA | So Oi-kwan | 1,079 | 55.82 | |
| ADPL | Cheung Cho-ying | 854 | 44.18 | |
| Majority | | 225 | 11.04 | |
| Independent gain from Independent | | Swing | | |

Tuen Mun District Board Election, 1991: Butterfly
| Party | Candidate | Votes | % | ±% |
|---|---|---|---|---|
| TMP | Yeung Mei-kwong | 2,226 | 57.73 | |
| NTAS | Wong Kin-hong | 1,630 | 42.27 | |
| Majority | | 596 | 15.46 | |
| Independent win (new seat) | | | | |
