= Wu King (constituency) =

Hong Kong constituency

- 湖景
- Elected constituency for the Tuen Mun District Council
- Boundary of Wu King in Tuen Mun District
- District: Tuen Mun
- Legislative Council constituency: New Territories North West
- Population: 13,434 (2019)
- Electorate: 8,429 (2019)

Current constituency
- Created: 1991
- Number of members: One
- Member: Chow Kai-lim (ADPL)

Wu King (Chinese: 湖景) is one of the 31 constituencies in the Tuen Mun District.

Created for the 1991 District Board elections, the constituency returns one district councillor to the Tuen Mun District Council, with an election every four years.

Wu King loosely covers areas surrounding Wu King Estate in Tuen Mun with an estimated population of 13,434.

== Councillors represented ==
Election	Member	Party
1991	Leung Kin-man	NTAS
199?	Leung Kin-man	NTWRA
199?	Leung Kin-man	DAB
2019	Chow Kai-lim	ADPL

== Election results ==
=== 2010s ===
Tuen Mun District Council Election, 2019: Wu King
Party	Candidate	Votes	%	±%
ADPL	Chow Kai-lim	3,724	67.83	
DAB	Leung Kin-man	1,766	32.17	
Majority		1,958	35.66	
Turnout		5,501	65.29	
ADPL gain from DAB		Swing		
