= Fung Nin (constituency) =

Hong Kong constituency

- Elected constituency for the Yuen Long District Council
- Boundary of Fung Nin in Yuen Long District
- District: Yuen Long
- Legislative Council constituency: New Territories North West
- Population: 19,006 (2019)
- Electorate: 9,495 (2019)

Current constituency
- Created: 1994
- Number of members: One
- Member: Vacant

Fung Nin (Chinese: 豐年) is one of the 39 constituencies in the Yuen Long District of Hong Kong.

The constituency returns one district councillor to the Yuen Long District Council, with an election every four years. Fung Nin constituency is loosely based on Chi King House, Crystal Park, Ho Shun Tai Building, Manhattan Plaza, Po Shing Building, Tsing Yu Terrace, and Yee Fung Garden with an estimated population of 19,006.

== Councillors represented ==
| Election | Member | Party |
|---|---|---|
| 1994 | Mak Wing-shing | Democratic |
| 1999 | Phyllis Wong Choi-mei | Nonpartisan |
| 2003 | Phyllis Wong Choi-mei | YLTSWDA |
| 2007 | Lui Kin | DAB |
| 2019 | Kisslan Chan King-lun→Vacant | Nonpartisan |

== Election results ==
=== 2010s ===
Yuen Long District Council Election, 2019: Fung Nin
| Party | Candidate | Votes | % | ±% |
|---|---|---|---|---|
| Nonpartisan | Kisslan Chan King-lun | 3,476 | 53.65 | |
| DAB | Lui Kin | 3,003 | 46.35 | |
| Majority | | 473 | 7.30 | |
| Turnout | | 6,503 | 68.53 | |
| Nonpartisan gain from DAB | | Swing | | |
