= Yuen Long Centre (constituency) =

Hong Kong constituency

- Elected constituency for the Yuen Long District Council
- Boundary of Yuen Long Centre in Yuen Long District
- District: Yuen Long
- Legislative Council constituency: New Territories North West
- Population: 15,542 (2019)
- Electorate: 6,741 (2019)

Current constituency
- Created: 1994
- Number of members: One
- Member: Vacant

Yuen Long Centre (Chinese: 元朗中心) is one of the 39 constituencies in the Yuen Long District of Hong Kong. This constituency was named "Tai Kiu" before 2007 District Council election.

The constituency returns one district councillor to the Yuen Long District Council, with an election every four years. Yuen Long Centre constituency is loosely based on Chek Wing Court, Cheong Yu Building, Chun Chu House, Fook On Building, Ho Shun Fuk Building, Hop Yick Plaza, Kui Fat Building, Kwong Wah Centre and Opulence Height in Yuen Long with estimated population of 15,542.

== Councillors represented ==
Election	Member	Party
1994	Lo Yuk-fun	DAB
2003	Tse Hoi-chau	YLTSWDA
2007	Siu Long-ming	DAB
2019	Shek King-ching→Vacant	Democratic Alliance

== Election results ==
=== 2010s ===
Yuen Long District Council Election, 2019: Yuen Long Centre
Party	Candidate	Votes	%	±%
Democratic Alliance	Shek King-ching	2,637	59.47	+20.09
DAB	Siu Long-ming	1,797	40.53	−20.09
Majority		840	18.94	
Turnout		4,446	66.00	+29.44
Democratic Alliance gain from DAB		Swing	+20.09	

Yuen Long District Council Election, 2015: Yuen Long Centre
Party	Candidate	Votes	%	±%
DAB	Siu Long-ming	1,615	60.62	–11.04
Democratic Alliance	Lam Ting-wai	1,049	39.38	N/a
Majority		566	21.24	
Turnout		2,661	36.56	
DAB hold		Swing	N/a	

Yuen Long District Council Election, 2011: Yuen Long Centre
Party	Candidate	Votes	%	±%
DAB	Siu Long-ming	1,912	71.66	
People Power	Hui Chiu-fan	756	28.34	N/a
Majority		1,156	43.33	
DAB hold		Swing	N/a	

=== 2000s ===
Yuen Long District Council Election, 2007: Yuen Long Centre
Party	Candidate	Votes	%	±%
DAB	Siu Long-ming	1,132	42.67	
Democratic Alliance	Mak Wing-kwong, Anthony	892	33.62	
Liberal	Wong Man-kin, Ken	629	23.71	
Majority		240	9.05	
DAB gain from Democratic Alliance		Swing		

Yuen Long District Council Election, 2003: Tai Kiu
Party	Candidate	Votes	%	±%
Democratic Alliance	Tse Hoi-chau	1,489	59.46	
DAB	Lo Yuk-fun	1,015	40.54	
Majority		474	18.92	
Democratic Alliance gain from DAB		Swing		

=== 1990s ===
Yuen Long District Council Election, 1999: Tai Kiu
Party	Candidate	Votes	%	±%
DAB	Lo Yuk-fun	1,483	59.42	
123DA	Tse Hoi-chau	1,013	40.58	
Majority		470	18.84	
DAB hold		Swing		
