= Tuen Mun Community Network =

Tuen Mun Community Network 屯門社區網絡
- Convenor: Wong Tan-ching
- Spokesman: Wong Tak-yuen
- Founded: 2015
- Dissolved: 7 October 2021
- Ideology: Localism (HK); Liberalism (HK); Tuen Mun regionalism
- Regional affiliation: Pro-democracy camp
- Colours: Blue

Tuen Mun Community Network (Chinese: 屯門社區網絡) was a local political group based in Tuen Mun founded in 2015. In a historic pro-democracy landslide in 2019 District Council election, the group won a total of four seats in the Tuen Mun District Council.

== History ==
The group was formed in 2015 as a Tuen Mun-based community group by a group of young people in their 20s to early 30s. It was notable for their involvement in revealing the scandal of the high repairing cost of the elevators in Leung King Estate and a protest caused by hawkers issue in 2016.

It was part of the Community Network Union, a localist political alliance of six community groups led by pro-independence Ventus Lau. Due to its association with independence movement, its convenor Wong Tan-ching was deported from Macau in May 2017. The Tuen Mun Community Network later quit the Union in 2018.

Tuen Mun Community Network was also active in social activism. In 2017, it organised more than 13,000 people signing a petition demanding pro-Beijing legislator Junius Ho who was a member Tuen Mun District Council to resign over his remarks on killing independence advocates. In the 2019 anti-extradition bill protests, the group also arranged coaches to drive residents to Hong Kong Island to join the June 9 protest.

Tuen Mun Community Network filled five candidates in the 2019 District Council election, with Poon Chi-kin in Tsui Hing, Wong Tan-ching in Shan King, Law Cheuk-yung in King Hing, Tsang Chun-hing in Hing Tsak and Wong Tak-yuen in Leung King. Four of the five candidates were elected in the pro-democracy historic landslide victory except for Law Cheuk-yung who lost in King Hing, which saw the pro-democrats gaining control of the Tuen Mun District Council and the group becoming the third largest grouping.

On 7 October 2021, Tuen Mun Community Network was officially dissolved, citing the belief that Hong Kong has lost the ability and space to continue to adhere to the original intention of the Sino-British Joint Declaration, and announced its dissolution with all members resigning.

== Electoral performance ==
=== Tuen Mun District Council elections ===
Election	Number of popular votes	% of popular votes	Total elected seats	+/−
2019	20,086	9.61	4 / 31	4▲
