= Clarisse Yeung =

Hong Kong politician (born 1986)

Clarisse Yeung Suet-ying
- 楊雪盈
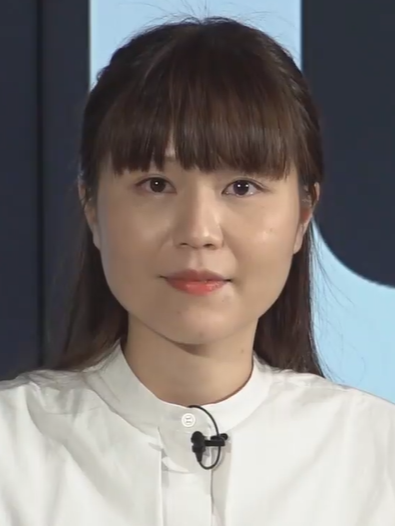

Chairwoman of the Wan Chai District Council
- In office 1 January 2020 – 15 September 2021
- Preceded by: Stephen Ng
- Succeeded by: Ivan Wong

Member of the Wan Chai District Council
- In office 1 January 2016 – 15 September 2021
- Preceded by: Wong Chor-fung
- Constituency: Tai Hang

Personal details
- Born: November 14, 1986 (age 39) British Hong Kong
- Party: Good Day Wanchai; Kickstart Wan Chai (2019-2021)
- Occupation: Politician, lecturer

Clarisse Yeung Suet-ying (Chinese: 楊雪盈; born 14 November 1986) is a Hong Kong politician. She is a former chairwoman of the Wan Chai District Council, representing Tai Hang.

== Biography ==
Yeung is a graduate of fine arts at the Chinese University of Hong Kong and a holder of a master's degree in visual arts from the Hong Kong Baptist University. She was a part-time post-secondary institute lecturer specialising in arts, culture and policy research.

Yeung first stepped in politics when she joined the failed campaign of local artist Chow Chun-fai in the 2012 Legislative Council election in Sports, Performing Arts, Culture and Publication functional constituency. Subsequently, they established the Hong Kong Culture Monitor, publishing studies and articles regarding local cultural policy and development.

During the 2014 Hong Kong protests, Yeung called for the setting up of the Umbrella Movement Visual Archive to gather art installations, photographs and other artworks related to the movement, of which she became co-founder. She ran in the 2015 District Council election in Tai Hang against the pro-Beijing New People's Party. She grabbed 1,398 votes, beating her nearest rival by 250 votes, becoming one of the few "umbrella soldiers" who were elected. In 2016, she formed a pro-democracy group named "ARTicipants" together with 14 other candidates, running for seats in the Culture sub-sector in the 2016 Hong Kong Election Committee Subsector elections. The ARTicipants list, including Yeung, lost to a pro-Beijing 15-member list which included actress Liza Wang.

In the 2019 District Council election, she initiated a group of fresh faces called Kickstart Wan Chai running in the Wan Chai District Council. The group won six seats in total with Yeung re-elected with 2,340 votes. With the pro-democrats seizing control of the council, Yeung was elected the chairwoman of the Wan Chai District Council. Yeung participated in the 2020 Hong Kong pro-democracy primaries, running for a seat in the Hong Kong Island constituency. She was unsuccessful in her bid, receiving 5,707 votes out of 90,247 voters in Hong Kong Island.

On 6 January 2021, Yeung was arrested with 52 other pro-democracy politicians for criminal charges under Hong Kong national security law. Later that day, her party Kickstart Wan Chai, which she co-founded in 2019, announced on Facebook the party would disband, effective immediately. Yeung was released on bail on 7 January. A bail hearing of Yeung and 46 other defendants from the 6 January swoop, which had begun on 1 March, was adjourned after midnight, with Yeung and three other defendants being sent to hospital for exhaustion; Yeung appeared to have fainted in the courtroom, with a post on her Facebook page saying that she had not received food in the preceding 12 hours and was treated in hospital for low blood pressure. On 5 March, Yeung together with three other defendants secured an extension of bail, with conditions including a prohibition of directly or indirectly contacting any foreign officials, members of parliament and their staff, and a curfew from midnight to 7:00 a.m. On 12 March 2021, her bail was upheld by High Court judge Esther Toh.

On 15 September 2021, Yeung was disqualified along with six other district councillors after a deadline to submit information for authorities to determine the validity of their oath-taking expired, and after she was charged for participating in the last year pro-democracy primaries. At the same time, she resigned from her position as Wan Chai District Council chairwoman.

Political offices
Preceded by Wong Chor-fung	Member of Wan Chai District Council; Representative for Tai Hang; 2016–2021	Vacant
Preceded by Stephen Ng	Chairwoman of Wan Chai District Council; 2020–2021	Succeeded by Ivan Wong
