= Tai Pak Tin West (constituency) =

Hong Kong constituency

- Elected constituency for the Kwai Tsing District Council
- Boundary of Tai Pak Tin West in Kwai Tsing District
- District: Kwai Tsing
- Legislative Council constituency: New Territories South West
- Population: 15,123 (2019)
- Electorate: 7,031 (2019)

Current constituency
- Created: 1994
- Number of members: One
- Member: Kwok Fu-yung (DAB)

Tai Pak Tin West (Chinese: 大白田西), previously Tai Pak Tin, is one of the 31 constituencies of the Kwai Tsing District Council in Hong Kong. The seat elects one member of the council every four years. It was first created in the 1994 elections. Its boundary is loosely based on the industrial part of Kwai Chung with estimated population of 15,123.

== Councillors represented ==
Election	Member	Party
1994	Sammy Tsui Sang-hung	Democratic
2015	Kwok Fu-yung	DAB

== Election results ==
=== 2010s ===
Kwai Tsing District Council Election, 2019: Tai Pak Tin West
Party	Candidate	Votes	%	±%
DAB	Kwok Fu-yung	2,449	48.03	−11.06
Ind. democrat	Szeto Kong-sun	2,106	41.30	
Nonpartisan	Ho Cheuk-wai	544	10.67	
Majority		343	6.73	
Turnout		5,111	72.73	
DAB hold		Swing		

Kwai Tsing District Council Election, 2015: Tai Pak Tin
Party	Candidate	Votes	%	±%
DAB	Kwok Fu-yung	2,284	59.09	+14.05
Democratic	Sammy Tsui Sang-hung	1,997	40.91	−9.03
Majority		287	18.18	
Turnout		4,881	51.8	
DAB gain from Democratic		Swing	+11.54	

Kwai Tsing District Council Election, 2011: Tai Pak Tin
Party	Candidate	Votes	%	±%
Democratic	Sammy Tsui Sang-hung	1,650	49.94	−5.45
DAB	Lui Hok-nang	1,488	45.04	+0.43
People Power	Lui Hok-nang	166	5.02	
Majority		162	4.90	
Turnout		3,304	38.61	
Democratic hold		Swing	−2.94	

=== 2000s ===
Kwai Tsing District Council Election, 2007: Tai Pak Tin
Party	Candidate	Votes	%	±%
Democratic	Tsui Sang-hung	1,429	55.39	−3.66
DAB	Tso Lap-ho	1,151	44.61	+3.66
Majority		278	10.78	
Democratic hold		Swing	−3.66	

Kwai Tsing District Council Election, 2003: Tai Pak Tin
Party	Candidate	Votes	%	±%
Democratic	Tsui Sang-hung	1,872	59.05	
DAB	Tang Chi-chiu	1,298	40.95	
Majority		574	18.10	
Democratic hold		Swing		

=== 1990s ===
Kwai Tsing District Council Election, 1999: Tai Pak Tin
Party	Candidate	Votes	%	±%
Democratic	Tsui Sang-hung	Unopposed		
Democratic hold		Swing		

Kwai Tsing District Board Election, 1994: Tai Pak Tin
Party	Candidate	Votes	%	±%
Democratic	Tsui Sang-hung	705	55.82	
ADPL	Wong Tsui-yee	558	44.18	
Majority		147	11.64	
Democratic win (new seat)				
