= Roundtable (Hong Kong) =

Roundtable 實政圓桌
- Convenor: Michael Tien
- Founded: 7 May 2017; 9 years ago
- Split from: New People's Party
- Ideology: Conservatism (HK); Moderate conservatism
- Regional affiliation: Pro-Beijing camp
- Colours: Blue
- Legislative Council: 1 / 90
- District Councils: 0 / 470
- NPC (HK deputies): 1 / 36
- CPPCC (HK members): 0 / 124

Roundtable
- Traditional Chinese: 實政圓桌
- Simplified Chinese: 实政圆桌
- Literal meaning: real political circle table
Transcriptions
Standard Mandarin
- Hanyu Pinyin: Shízhèng Yuánzhuō
Yue: Cantonese
- Jyutping: Sat6 Zing3 Jyun4 Coek3

Roundtable is a Hong Kong political organisation founded in 2017 by Michael Tien after he quit the New People's Party. The group currently holds one seat in the Legislative Council, occupied by Mark Chong.

The organization was founded after Tien complained that the New People's Party was becoming too close to Beijing.

Although it is aligned with the pro-Beijing camp, Roundtable has found itself at odds the camp on certain issues. One such example is when Tien supported scrapping the pro-Beijing extradition law. Another example is when he supported an independent inquiry into police abuses. The group has been considered one of the more moderate members of the pro-Beijing camp.

== Performance in elections ==
=== Legislative Council elections ===
Election	Number of popular votes	% of popular votes	GC seats	FC seats	EC seats	Total seats	+/−	Position
2021	40,009	3.02	1	0	0	1 / 90	1	8th
2025	34,756▼	2.72▼	1	0	0	1 / 90	0	8th

=== District Council elections ===
Election	Number of popular votes	% of popular votes	Total elected seats	+/−
2019	26,055	0.89	2 / 452	5▼
2023	7,149▼	0.61▼	0 / 470	2▼

== Representatives ==
=== Legislative Council ===
Constituency	Member
New Territories North West	Michael Tien

== See also ==
- United Front Work Department
- United Front (China)
- Conservatism in Hong Kong
- Centrist camp
- New People's Party (Hong Kong)
