= New Territories North West (2021 constituency) =

Geographical constituency in Hong Kong

- Geographical constituency for the Legislative Council of Hong Kong
- Boundary of New Territories North West in Hong Kong
- District: Tuen Mun District; Southern part of Yuen Long District
- Region: New Territories
- Population: 791,700
- Electorate: 468,752

Current constituency
- Created: 2021
- Number of members: Two
- Members: Holden Chow (DAB/NTAS); Michael Tien (Roundtable)
- Created from: New Territories West (1998)

The New Territories North West geographical constituency is one of the ten geographical constituencies in the elections for the Legislative Council of Hong Kong which elects two members of the Legislative Council using the single non-transferable vote (SNTV) system. The constituency covers Tuen Mun District and southern part of Yuen Long District in New Territories.

== History ==
The constituency was created under the overhaul of the electoral system imposed by the Beijing government in 2021, replacing Tuen Mun District and the southern part of Yuen Long District (all District Council constituencies not covered by New Territories North) of the New Territories West used from 1998 to 2021. A constituency with the same name were also created for the 1995 Legislative Council election in the late colonial period.

== Returning members ==
Election	Member	Party	Member	Party
2021	Holden Chow	DAB/NTAS	Michael Tien	Roundtable
2025	Holden Chow	DAB/NTAS	Mark Chong	Roundtable

== Election results ==
=== 2020s ===
2025 Legislative Council election: New Territories North West
Party	Candidate	Votes	%	±%
DAB	Holden Chow Ho-ding	42,347	30.64	−37.25
Roundtable	Chong Ho-fung	34,756	25.15	−4.0
FTU	Luk Chung-hung	23,282	16.84	+16.84
NPP	Kam Man-fung	11,893	8.6	+8.6
Independent	Leung Ming-kin	25,936	18.77	+18.77
Total valid votes		138,214	100.00	
Rejected ballots				
Turnout				
Registered electors		436,796		
DAB hold		Swing		
Roundtable hold		Swing		

Vote share
1. DAB (67.9%)
2. Roundtable (29.1%)
3. Third Side (2.96%)

2021 Legislative Council election: New Territories North West
Party	Candidate	Votes	%	±%
DAB (NTAS)	Holden Chow Ho-ding	93,195	67.89	
Roundtable	Michael Tien Puk-sun	40,009	29.15	
Third Side	Wong Chun-long	4,066	2.96	
Total valid votes		137,270	100.00	
Rejected ballots		2,582		
Turnout		139,852	29.83	
Registered electors		468,752		
DAB win (new seat)				
Roundtable win (new seat)				
