= Shing Yan (constituency) =

Hong Kong constituency

- 盛欣
- Elected constituency for the Yuen Long District Council
- Boundary of Shing Yan in Yuen Long District
- District: Yuen Long
- Legislative Council constituency: New Territories North
- Population: 12,903 (2019)
- Electorate: 8,628 (2019)

Current constituency
- Created: 2019
- Number of members: One
- Member: Vacant
- Created from: Ping Shan Central, Tin Shing

Shing Yan (Chinese: 盛欣) is one of the 39 constituencies in the Yuen Long District.

Created for the 2019 District Council elections, the constituency returns one district councillor to the Yuen Long District Council, with an election every four years.

Shing Yan loosely covers housing estates including part of Tin Shing Court and Ping Yan Court in Tin Shui Wai. It has projected population of 12,903.

== Councillors represented ==
Election	Member	Party
2019	Au Kwok-kuen→Vacant	TCHDNTW→Nonpartisan

== Election results ==
=== 2010s ===
Yuen Long District Council Election, 2019: Shing Yan
Party	Candidate	Votes	%	±%
Team Chu (PfD)	Au Kwok-kuen	3,530	55.67	
Nonpartisan	Lam Wai-ming	1,495	23.58	
Roundtable	Chong Ho-fung	1,195	18.85	
Nonpartisan	Ng Ka-chun	61	0.96	
Nonpartisan	Wong Kwok-hung	60	0.95	
Majority		2,035	32.09	
Turnout		6,356	71.72	
win (new seat)				
