= Tin Wah Estate =

Public housing estate in Tin Shui Wai, Hong Kong

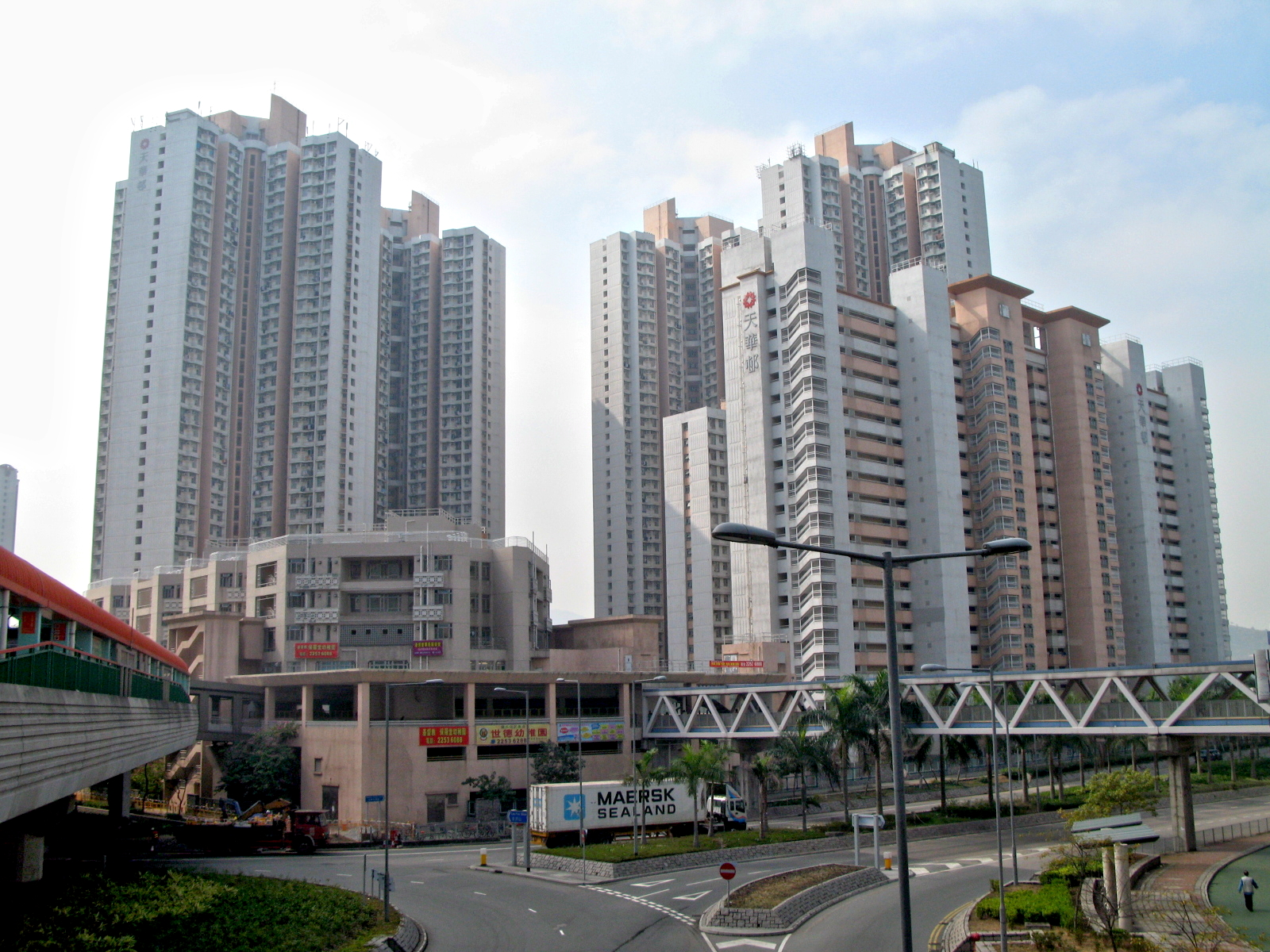
- Tin Wah Estate
- Interactive map of Tin Wah Estate

General information
- Location: 21 Tin Tan Street, Tin Shui Wai; New Territories, Hong Kong
- Coordinates: 22.46097°N 113.99577°E
- Status: Completed
- Category: Public rental housing
- Population: 12,366 (2016)
- No. of blocks: 7
- No. of units: 3,719

Construction
- Constructed: 1999; 27 years ago
- Authority: Hong Kong Housing Authority

Tin Wah Estate (Chinese: 天華邨) is a public housing estate in Tin Shui Wai, New Territories, Hong Kong, near Tin Chung Court, Tin Fu Court, Tin Yan Estate and Light Rail Chung Fu stop. It consists of seven residential buildings completed in 1999.

== Houses ==
Name	Chinese name	Building type	Completed
Wah Choi House	華彩樓	Single Aspect Building	1999
Wah Long House	華朗樓	Single Aspect Building	1999
Wah Sui House	華萃樓	Harmony 1	1999
Wah Yuet House	華悅樓	Harmony 1	1999
Wah Yat House	華逸樓	Harmony 1	1999
Wah Yau House	華祐樓	Harmony 1	1999
Ancillary Facilities Block	服務設施大樓	Non-standard	1999

== Demographics ==
According to the 2016 by-census, Tin Wah Estate had a population of 12,366. The median age was 37.2 and the majority of residents (97.8 per cent) were of Chinese ethnicity. The average household size was 3.4 people. The median monthly household income of all households (i.e. including both economically active and inactive households) was HK$26,400.

== Politics ==
For the 2019 District Council election, the estate fell within two constituencies. Most of the estate is located in the Chung Wah constituency, which was formerly represented by Chan Sze-nga until October 2021, while Wah Sui House and Wah Yau House falls within the Shui Wah constituency, which was formerly represented by Lam Chun until July 2021.

== See also ==
- Public housing estates in Tin Shui Wai
