= Ken Chow Wing Kan =

Hong Kong politician

Chow Wing Kan, Ken
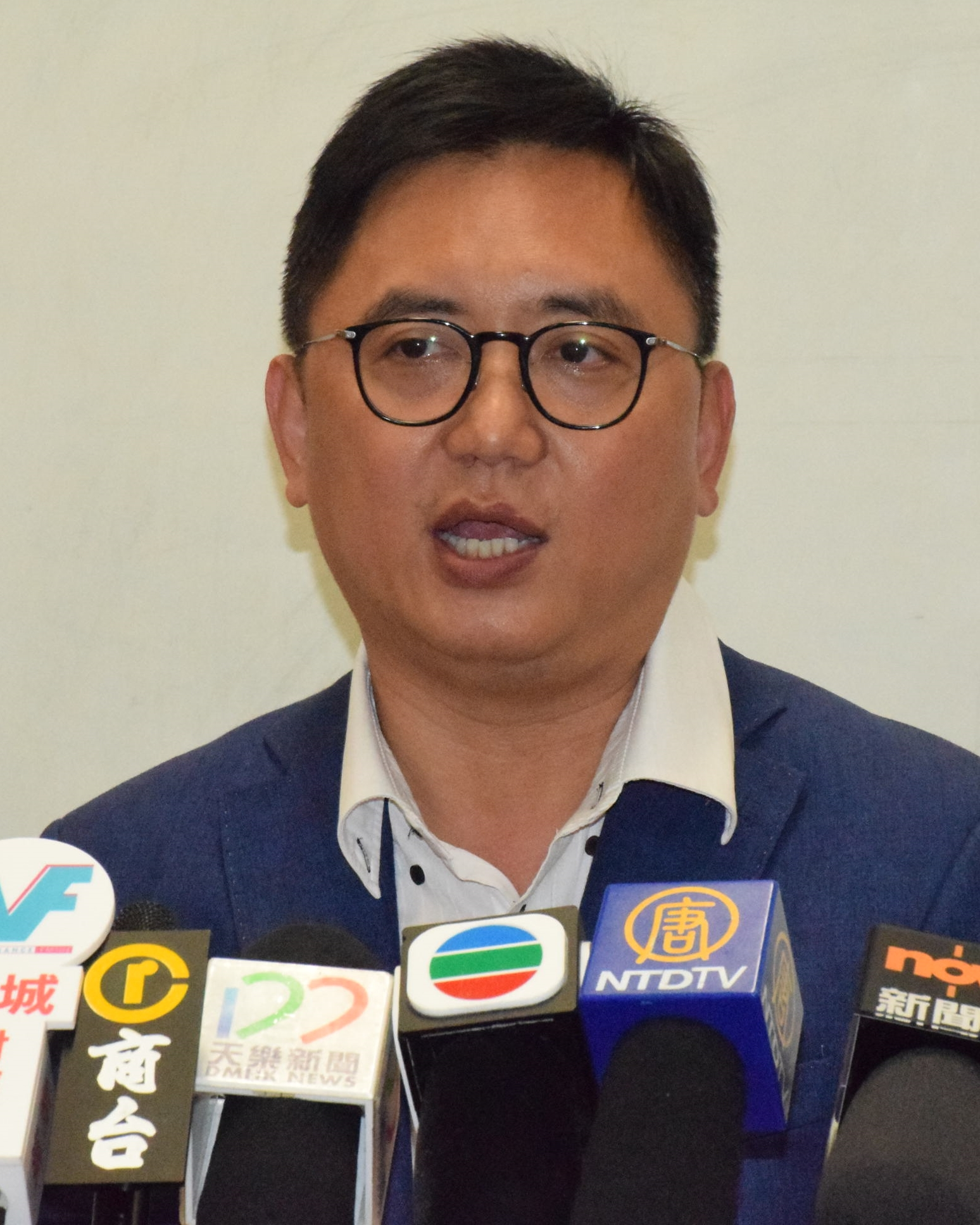
- 香港自由黨成員周永勤

Yuen Long District Councilcouncillor
- In office 1 October 1994 – 31 December 2019
- Preceded by: Constituency Creation
- Succeeded by: Lam Chun
- Constituency: Tin Shui Constituency（1994－2003） Shui Wah Constituency（2003－2019）

Personal details
- Party: HKPA（1994－2004） LIBP（2004－2016）
- Education: The Open University of Hong Kong; City University of Hong Kong; The Hong Kong Polytechinic University; Chinese University of Hong Kong
- Occupation: Political figure
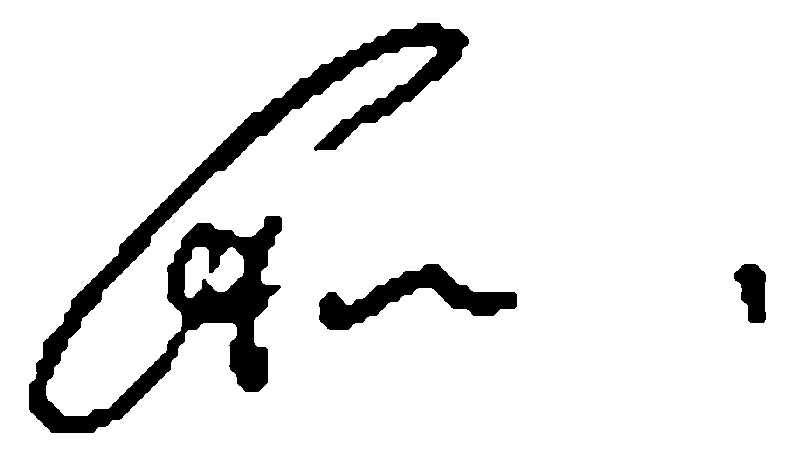
- Signature

Chow Wing Kan (Ken) (born 26 October 1966), was a member of the Hong Kong Progressive Alliance and the Liberal Party, and is a political figure of the Hong Kong Pro-Beijing camp. He has worked in the district of Tin Shui Wai, Yuen Long District for many years. He served as a member of the Yuen Long District Council from October 1994, being re-elected five times until he failed in 2019, amid a sweeping Pan-democrat victory.

Chow Wing Kan and Chow Liang Shuk-yee jointly formed the list to represent the Liberal Party in the 2008 Hong Kong Legislative Council election in the New Territories West Constituency, but both failed. In the 2016 Hong Kong Legislative Council election, he once again competed for the New Territories West seat on a one-person list, but withdrew from all election activities after he reported receiving threats from persons in China, in an incident that was widely reported.

== Early life ==
Chow Wing Kan was born in the Tuen Mun District of Hong Kong with ancestry in the New Territories. Chow lived in Leung Tin Village, Tuen Mun when he was small. When he was young, he and Junius Ho attended the Leung Tin Kindergarten operated by Ho's mother and maintained friendly exchanges. When Chow was in elementary school, he was enrolled in the Chinese Christian Church's Watson Elementary School, and became a Christian under the influence of the school. When Chow was in middle school, his family moved to Yuen Long to live. After graduating from university, Chow served as a corrections officer in the Hong Kong Correctional Services Department. He also stopped working in the church due to the need to work overnight shifts.

Chow earlier assisted Tang's parliamentary work in the Tang Sui-tong office of the Rural Committee. The two joined the Hong Kong Progressive Alliance. Finally, Chow became Tang's assistant. In the early 1990s, the development of Tin Shui Wai New Town began to take shape. Tang commissioned Chow to represent the rural party in the election of the newly added Tin Shui constituency seats in the 1994 Hong Kong Local elections, and Chow also started his political career.

=== British Hong Kong ===
In the 1994 District Council election,. The Yuen Long District Council, in response to the increase in the population of Tin Shui Village in Tin Shui Wai, delineated the new Tin Shui Constituency. In the new village, Pro-Beijing camp (Hong Kong), which have traditional power, are competing with foreign parties. Chow Wing Kan finally won 2,093 votes with the support of Tang Siu-tong. The opponent Liberal Party Yeung Yan-fai received only 100 votes. Chow won 96% of the votes and was elected as a member of the Yuen Long District Council at the age of 27.

He actively explored the Tin Shui Wai area for work after and afterwards. He believed that Hong Kong's good economy has enabled nuclear families to actively invest in the community after moving into new towns and the society is thriving. After he took office in October 1994, a series of sex crimes occurred in Tin Shui Wai. A female victim notified him of the identity of a person involved and Chow lured him to the office for police to arrest on the spot. Since then, Chow has repeatedly attacked crimes in Tin Shui Wai.

At this time, some local people were very dissatisfied with the British Hong Kong government. In the 1995 Hong Kong Legislative election, Governor of Hong Kong Chris Patten adopted direct elections, so that the New Territories West Constituency, which has been dominated by the rural party, was also replaced by the Pro-democracy camp (Hong Kong). After the election, the Registration and Electoral Office announced that about 6,000 out of a total of 110,000 voters in Tuen Mun and Yuen Long districts had failed to vote. Chow, who was Tang Siu-tong ’s deputy, personally submitted an election petition to the High Court. Chow found 108 victims who made mistakes in registration in 1996, hoping to rush to re-election before returning, but the High Court ruled that voter registration is not an election procedure and cannot overturn the results of the election. Chow, who lost the case, still thinks the case was unfair.

Following the Handover of Hong Kong, a large number of Gurkha soldiers of the British Forces Overseas Hong Kong settled with their families in Hong Kong in retirement. Chow Wing Kan recognised their difficulty adapting to Hong Kong society, so he decided to serve as a consultant for many South Asian ethnic groups to help them integrate into Hong Kong society. At the same time, new immigrants from Mainland China have also moved into Tin Shui Wai one after another, which is also not suitable for Culture of Hong Kong. The new residents, together with the original Tin Shui Wai residents, have greatly increased the population and density of the district, which has caused many community problems such as insufficient school degrees. In the early days of the reunification, Tin Shui Wai Jumper happened frequently, and Chow personally persuaded at least 13 people to give up suicide.

In 1999, Chow and his engineers revealed the Tin Chung Court short pile case, forcing the Hong Kong Housing Authority to pay HK $250 million for reinforcement works. Chow has always been concerned about the quality of the reinforcement works during the reinforcement works. At the same time, he also questioned whether the Housing Authority has properly monitored the construction works on other issues of Tin Chung Court.

Chow pointed out that increasing attention to promote community building requires the support of different channels. He organized various activities in the Tin Shui Wai District, such as singing activities such as Cantonese opera and Cantopop music, organized volunteer networks, and youth groups such as Scouting and Taekwondo teams in order to make the community more harmonious. Chow said that the Tin Hang Village and the subsequent mass destruction in 2004, the Hong Kong government began to adjust the development strategy of the new town in Tin Shui Wai.

As a Christian, Chow expressed concern about the crime of church organization. In 2004, he also provided information to the Hong Kong police Force on the incident of hydrogen peroxide drinking promoted by members of the Hong Kong Church of Zion, including church members, meeting places, audio tapes and victim cases. Eventually, the missionary activities of the Church of Zion disappeared on the streets of Tin Shui Wai. In the same year, he was invited by the CCC Fong Yun Wah Secondary School to serve as the school manager and returned to the church at the invitation of the pastor.

After the reunification, Chow was re-elected for many terms in Yuen Long District Council. He won again in the Tin Shui Constituency with an 84% vote in the 1999 Hong Kong local elections. Although the constituencies in the 2003 Hong Kong local elections changed, the original Shui Wah constituency merged with the 1999 Tin Wah Village to form the Shui Wah constituency, but Chow did not challenge his opponent in this election, and was automatically re-elected as a member of the Hong Kong Progressive Alliance. After Tang Siu-tong retired, Chow, who worked well in the region, was favored by Lau wong-fat and invited by Lau to join the Liberal Party. In 2004, he became Lau ’s manager and became a representative of the rural and institutional factions in Yuen Long.

After joining the Liberal Party in 2004, Chow Wing Kan continued to work in the district of Tin Shui Wai, and was re-elected in the Shui Wah Constituency with an 81% vote in the 2007 Hong Kong local elections. In the 2008 Hong Kong Legislative election, he was nominated by the Liberal Party for the New Territories West Constituency. He joined the list of Selina Chow who has been a member of the legislature since 1981, and she was behind her to help her re-elect. However, because the Liberal Party did not support Hong Kong Basic Law Article 23 to offend the Hong Kong Liaison Office, he and other members of the rural party voted with other formed political parties, and he also joined the Liberal Party member Lau Wong-fat on the election day for the Democratic Alliance for the Betterment and Progress of Hong Kong Entering the league to solicit votes, Serena Chow failed to be re-elected, and Chow Wing Kan also failed to be elected. The Liberal Party's defeat triggered Chow Liang Shuk-yee's resignation as vice chairman and a large-scale withdrawal from the party. After joining the party, Lau joined the Business and Professionals Alliance and invited Chow Wing Kan to join, but Chow refused.

Although Chow Wing Kan still maintains a good relationship with Lau Wong-fat in private, Chow remains in the Liberal Party and is no longer a political ally of Lau. In the 2011 Hong Kong local elections, Chow faced challenges from the Civic Party Lau Koon-Hang and the institutional independent Ko Chun-Kit in the Shui Wah constituency. In the end, Chow was re-elected with more than half of the votes. However, in the 2012 Hong Kong Legislative election, the Liberal Party did not nominate Chow to be elected. Instead, he fully supported James Tien’s return to the Legislative Council in the New Territories East constituency.

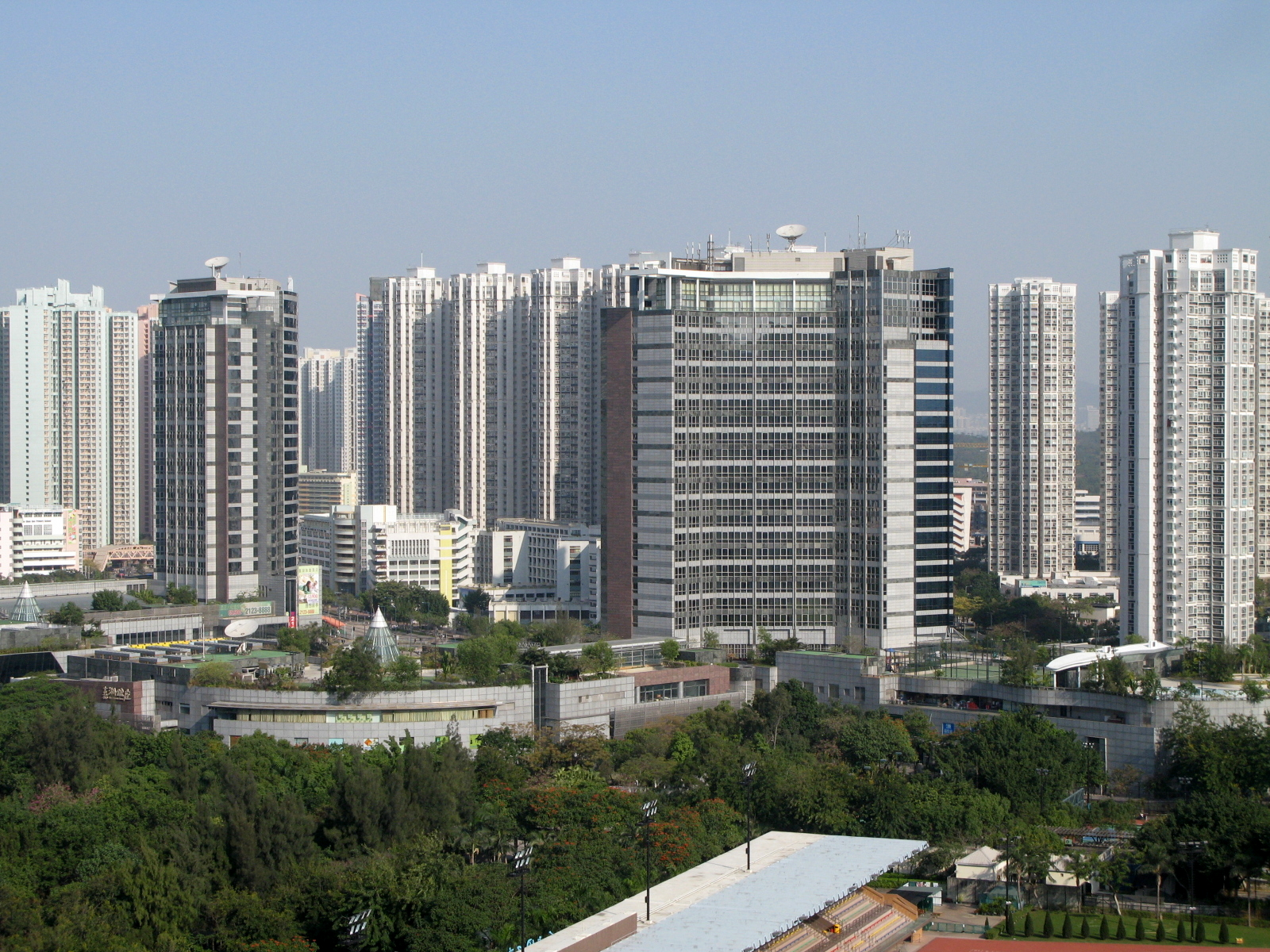
Changjiang Industrial holds a majority stake in Fujiahu, the shopping mall where the former Deyi Kindergarten is located.

In 2014, the Tin Shui Wai shopping mall increased the rent of Fortune Kingswood, which led to the closure of Topkids International Pre-School. Chow found that the Li Ka-shing family's Cheung Kong Holdings owned more than half of the mall's equity, which caused the public to put pressure on Li's. He even attended the forum as a guest to protest the rent increase without being invited by the city forum. Although in the end, kindergartens could not change the results of the suspension, but in the District Council report later that week, kindergartens lacked government support and believed that the government needs to take more responsibility for early childhood education.
