= Kingswood North (constituency) =

Hong Kong constituency

- Elected constituency for the Yuen Long District Council
- Boundary of Kingswood North in Yuen Long District
- District: Yuen Long
- Legislative Council constituency: New Territories North
- Population: 22,036 (2019)
- Electorate: 11,794 (2019)

Current constituency
- Created: 1999
- Number of members: One
- Member: Vacant

Kingswood North (Chinese: 嘉湖北) is one of the 39 constituencies in the Yuen Long District of Hong Kong.

The constituency returns one district councillor to the Yuen Long District Council, with an election every four years. The Kingswood North constituency is loosely based on part of Kingswood Villas in Tin Shui Wai, with an estimated population of 22,036.

== Councillors represented ==
Election	Member	Party
1999	Lee Yuet-man	DAB→Independent
2003	Lee Yuet-man	Independent
2007	Lee Yuet-man	Independent
2011	Lee Yuet-man	Independent
2015	Lee Yuet-man	Independent
2019	Ng Kin-wai→Vacant (Note: Resigned on 9 May 2021 after being arrested under national security law.)	TSW Connection

== Election results ==
=== 2010s ===
Yuen Long District Council Election, 2019: Kingswood North
Party	Candidate	Votes	%	±%
TSW Connection	Ng Kin-wai	4,371	49.93	
Independent	Lee Yuet-man	4,206	48.05	
Nonpartisan	To Ho-shun	177	2.02	
Majority		165	1.88	
Turnout		8,779	74.45	
TSW Connection hold		Swing		
