= 2021 population census in Hong Kong =

Population census in Hong Kong

2021 population census in HK

General information
- Country: Hong Kong
- Authority: Census and Statistics Department

The 2021 population census (21C) in Hong Kong was conducted by the Census and Statistics Department (C&SD) of the HKSAR Government during 23 June to 4 August 2021. The 21C was conducted under the Census and Statistics (2021 Population Census) Order, which was made by the Chief Executive in Council under Section 9 of the Census and Statistics Ordinance (Cap 316). The Order, published in the Gazette on 16 October 2020, provided statutory backing for the conduct of the 21C.

The 21C comprised a simple enumeration on about nine-tenths of households in Hong Kong to provide basic information (e.g. year and month of birth and sex) and a detailed enquiry on the remaining one-tenth on a broad range of demographic and socio-economic characteristics. Therefore, two types of questionnaire, namely the "Short Form" and the "Long Form", were used.

The "Short Form", which was used in the simple enumeration, covered only some basic questions. On the other hand, the "Long Form", which was used in the detailed sample enquiry, included not only those questions covered in the "Short Form", but also additional ones related to the socio-economic characteristics of the population and the characteristics of households and quarters. Taking together the common information collected in both the "Short Form" and "Long Form" would give the complete enumeration results on the basic characteristics of the population. It would also form the basis for estimation of the detailed socio-economic characteristics collected through the "Long Form".

== Slogans and mascots ==
Two slogans were adopted to promote the importance of the 21C and encourage households to use online questionnaires:

2021 Census: Provide Data for Hong Kong's Future

Online Census: Convenient, Secure and Green

Two mascots were also created to help disseminate publicity messages to the public, "Paul", and "Charlotte".

Paul: Charlotte:

== Data topics ==
Demographic and social characteristics

- Year and month of birth*
- Sex*
- Marital status
- Usual spoken language
- Ability to speak other languages / dialects
- Ability to read / write languages
- Nationality
- Ethnicity*
- Place of birth*
- Elderly persons requiring care

Economic characteristics

- Economic activity status
- Industry
- Occupation
- Whether having secondary employment
- Earnings from main employment
- Earnings from other employment
- Other cash income
- Hours of work
- Place of work
- Mode of transport to place of work

Educational characteristics

- School attendance
- Educational attainment (highest level attended)
- Educational attainment (highest level completed)
- Field of education
- Place of study
- Mode of transport to place of study

Housing characteristics

- Type of quarters*
- Type of accommodation
- Whether the quarters is used as usual or occasional residence*
- Whether the quarters is a subdivided unit*
- Number of rooms in the residence
- Floor area of accommodation*
- No. of households in quarters*(derived)
- No. of occupants in quarters*(derived)
- Tenure of accommodation
- Rent
- Mortgage payment or loan payment

Internal migration characteristics

- Whereabouts at census reference moment*
- Duration of residence in Hong Kong
- Place of residence 5 years ago

Household characteristics

- Type of household
- Relationship to head of household
- Whether a member of household*
- Household size*(derived)
- Household composition（derived）
- Household income（derived）

Notes

Items with * are those included in the "Short-Form" questionnaire. For the "Long-Form" questionnaire, all the above data topics are included (a total of 46 items).

== Data collection methods ==
A multi-modal data collection approach was used in the 21C.

In the first phase, all households might provide the required information through the following means:

1. online questionnaire;
2. postal questionnaire with pre-paid return envelope ("Short Form" only); and
3. telephone interview via the hotline 18 2021.

In the second phase of data collection, C&SD would arrange census officers to visit households that had not yet provided their information, and use mobile tablets to collect the required information.

Besides, for households residing on fishing boats, their number was estimated based on aerial photos of all anchorages in Hong Kong Waters and their characteristics estimated based on information provided by the Agriculture, Fisheries and Conservation Department. As for households residing on pleasure craft, notification letters were sent to the sampled households to invite them to complete and submit the online questionnaires.

Special arrangements were made to enumerate some special groups of persons (called the special classes) who stayed in places with restriction or difficulty of access.

In light of the COVID-19 epidemic, C&SD had encouraged households to provide data through online questionnaire or telephone interview so as to reduce face-to-face contact. The census officers would not visit those households that had submitted the questionnaires.

== Confidentiality ==
C&SD will not release respondents' personal data to any unauthorised persons, including other Government departments. Under the Census and Statistics Ordinance, it is an offence to disclose the particulars of individual persons or households to unauthorised persons. All Temporary Field Workers had taken an oath of secrecy, and had been stressed the importance of protecting data confidentiality and the legal consequence of improper handling of the data in their training. All collected data, including those provided by households through the Internet and collected by census officers using mobile tablets, were encrypted during transmission, and would only be stored and processed in designated area of C&SD. The transient data in mobile tablets were also encrypted and then deleted once uploaded. Besides, all completed questionnaires, in both paper and electronic forms, would be destroyed within 12 months after the completion of the survey.

== Pilot survey ==
C&SD conducted the Pilot Survey for the 21C from 23 June to 4 August 2020 to test the questionnaire design and the operational arrangements for the 21C. The Pilot Survey covered some 40 000 quarters in four selected District Council districts namely Wan Chai, Sham Shui Po, Kwai Tsing, and Sha Tin. All households and people staying in the selected quarters were enumerated.

== Comparison between last census ==
Compared with the 2011 population census in Hong Kong, the 21C has the following changes:

- The number of data topics has increased from 41 in 2011 to 46 in 2021, including elderly persons requiring care (included in 2021), ability to read/write languages, hours of work, whether the quarters is a subdivided unit and floor area of accommodation (included in 2016).
- As in the 2016 Population By-census, census officers had used mobile tablets to conduct face-to-face interviews in the 21C, and telephone interview had been added as an additional data collection mode.

== History ==
History
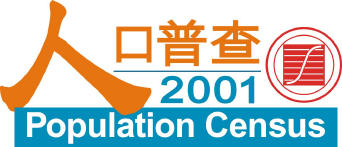
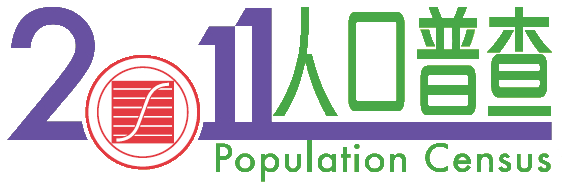
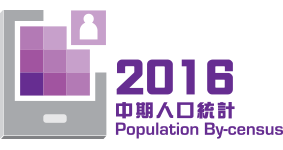
- 2001 Population Census 2006 Population By-census 2011 Population Census 2016 Population By-census

Since 1961, a population census has been conducted in Hong Kong every 10 years and a by-census in the middle of the intercensal period.

Population censuses were conducted in 1961, 1971, 1981, 1991, 2001 and 2011 while population by-censuses in 1966, 1976, 1986, 1996, 2006 and 2016.

For more information about the past population censuses / by-censuses, please visit the following websites:

- 2001 Population Census
- 2006 Population By-census
- 2011 Population Census
- 2016 Population By-census

== See also ==
- Population census in Hong Kong
- Census and Statistics Department, HKSAR
