= Tin Shing Court =

Public housing estate in Hong Kong

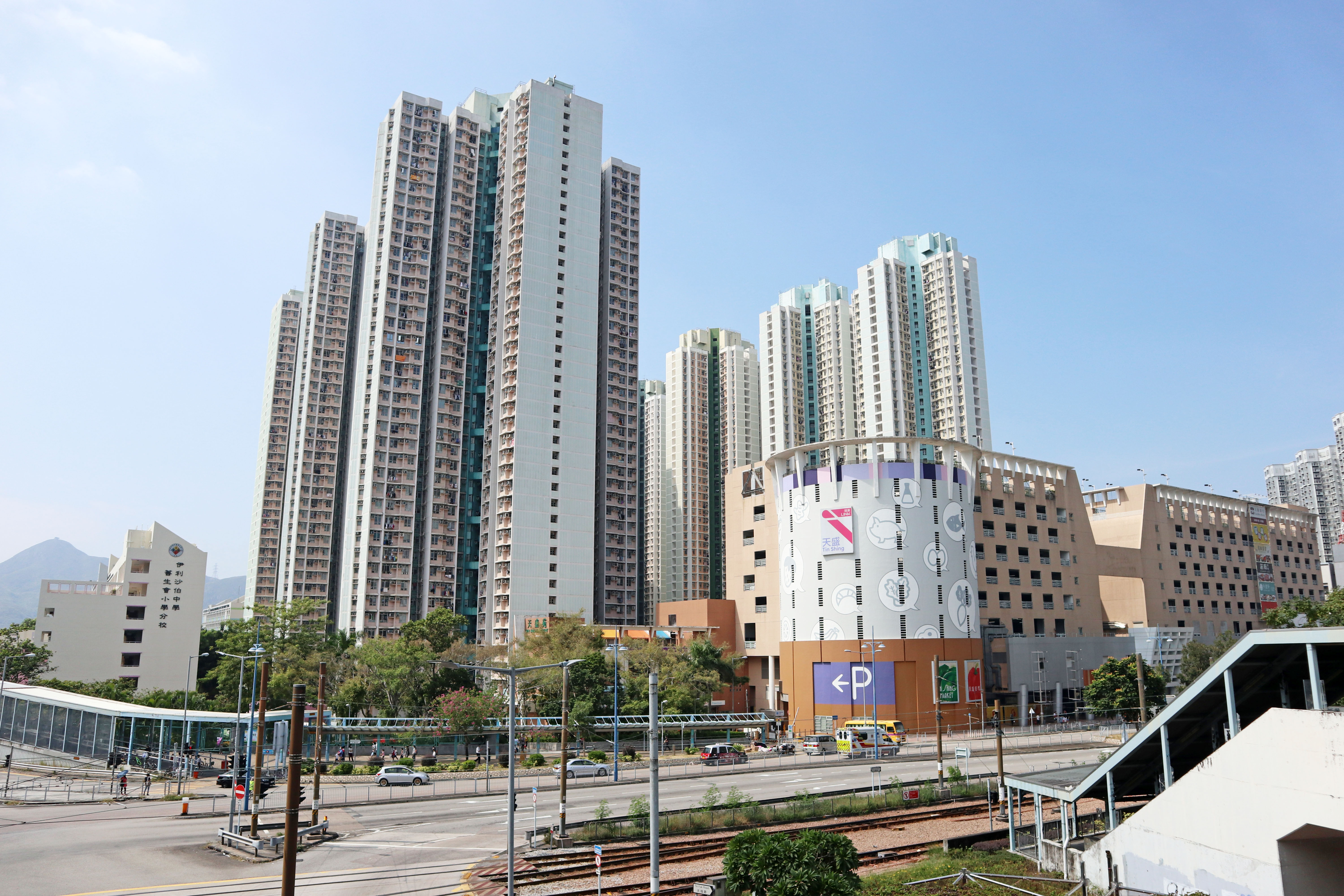
- Tin Shing Court
- Interactive map of Tin Shing Court

General information
- Location: 3 Tin Ching Street, Tin Shui Wai; New Territories, Hong Kong
- Coordinates: 22.4482023°N 114.0006215°E
- Status: Completed
- Category: Home Ownership Scheme
- Population: 20,664 (2016)
- No. of blocks: 17
- No. of units: 6,580

Construction
- Constructed: 1999; 27 years ago
- Authority: Hong Kong Housing Authority

Tin Shing Court (Chinese: 天盛苑) is a Home Ownership Scheme court developed by the Hong Kong Housing Authority in Tin Shui Wai, New Territories, Hong Kong, near Tin Yiu Estate, Light Rail Tin Yiu stop and Tin Shui Wai stop as well as MTR Tin Shui Wai station. It has totally 17 residential buildings completed in 1999.

== Houses ==
Name	Chinese name	Building type	Completed
Shing Choi House (Block A)	盛彩閣	Harmony 1 Option 7 (3.5 Generation)	1999
Shing Chiu House (Block B)	盛昭閣	Harmony 1 Option 7 (3.5 Generation)	1999
Shing Yi House (Block C)	盛頤閣	Harmony 1 Option 7 (3.5 Generation)	1999
Shing Yin House (Block D)	盛賢閣	Harmony 1 Option 7 (3.5 Generation)	1999
Shing Kan House (Block E)	盛勤閣	Concord 1 Option 1	1999
Shing Chi House (Block F)	盛志閣	Concord 1 Option 1	1999
Shing Wui House (Block G)	盛匯閣	Concord 2 Option 2	1999
Shing Him House (Block H)	盛謙閣	Concord 1 Option 1	1999
Shing Yuet House (Block J)	盛悅閣	Concord 1 Option 1	1999
Shing Ting House (Block K)	盛鼎閣	Concord 1 Option 2	1999
Shing Hang House (Block L)	盛亨閣	Concord 1 Option 2	1999
Shing Yuk House (Block M)	盛旭閣	Concord 1 Option 2	1999
Shing Chun House (Block N)	盛珍閣	Concord 1 Option 2	1999
Shing Chuen House (Block O)	盛泉閣	Concord 1 Option 1	1999
Shing Yu House (Block P)	盛譽閣	Concord 1 Option 1	1999
Shing Kwan House (Block Q)	盛坤閣	Concord 1 Option 1	1999
Shing Lai House (Block R)	盛麗閣	Concord 1 Option 1	1999

== Demographics ==
According to the 2016 by-census, Tin Shing Court had a population of 20,664. The median age was 43.4 and the majority of residents (96.5 per cent) were of Chinese ethnicity. The average household size was 3.3 people. The median monthly household income of all households (i.e. including both economically active and inactive households) was HK$30,000.

== Politics ==
For the 2019 District Council election, the estate fell within two constituencies. Most of the estate is located in the Tin Shing constituency, which is represented by Hau Man-kin. The remainder falls within the Shing Yan constituency, which is represented by Au Kwok-kuen.

== See also ==
- Public housing estates in Tin Shui Wai
- List of Home Ownership Scheme Courts in Hong Kong
