= Tin Shui Estate =

Public housing estate in Tin Shui Wai, Hong Kong

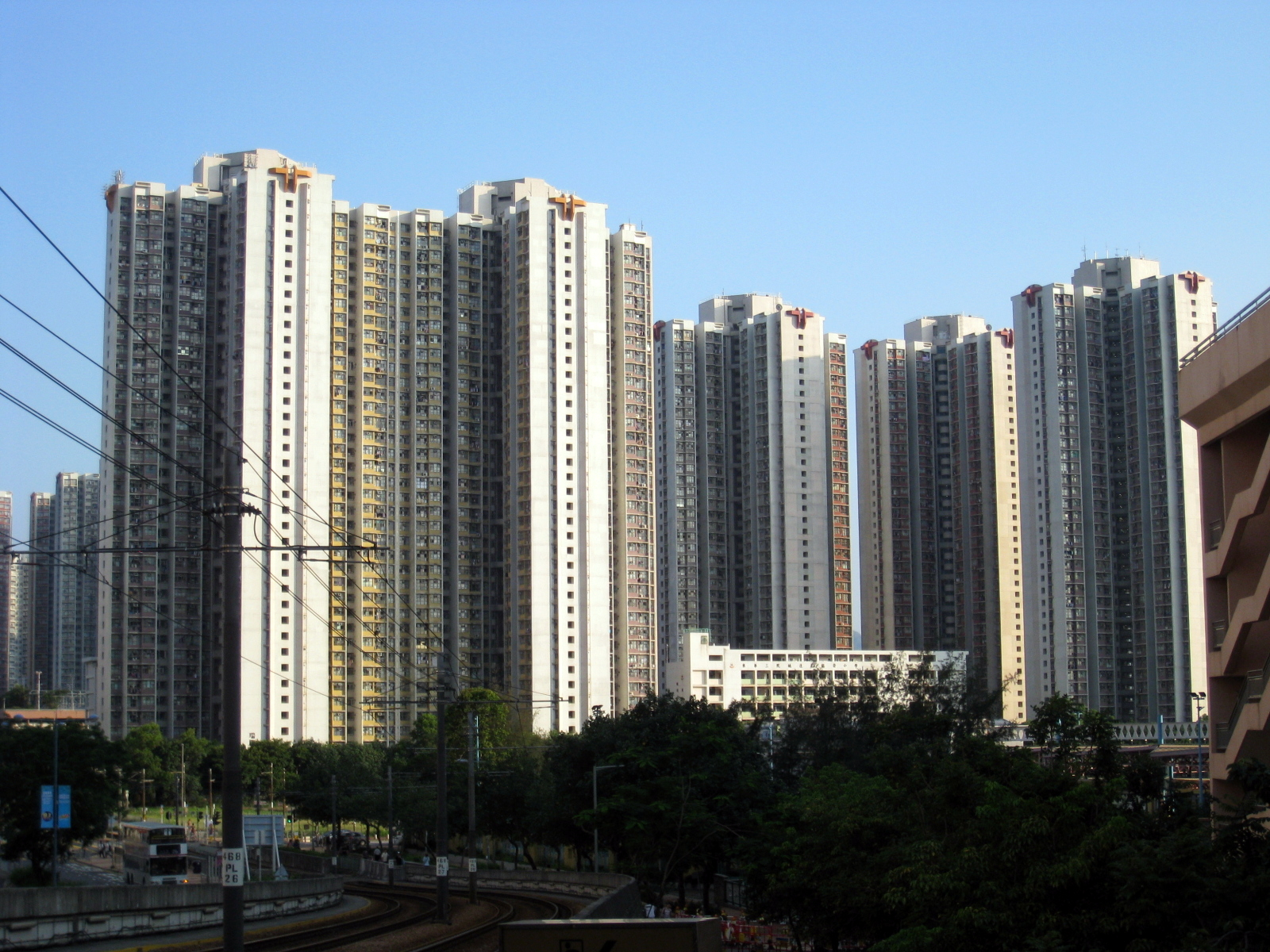
- Tin Shui (I) Estate
- Interactive map of Tin Shui Estate

General information
- Location: 9 Tin Shui Road, Tin Shui Wai; New Territories, Hong Kong
- Coordinates: 22.4562565°N 113.9978232°E
- Status: Completed
- Category: Public rental housing
- Population: 22,600 (2024)
- No. of blocks: 12
- No. of units: 4,600 (Tin Shui (I) Estate); 3,200 (Tin Shui (II) Estate)

Construction
- Constructed: 1993; 33 years ago
- Authority: Hong Kong Housing Authority

Tin Shui Estate (Chinese: 天瑞邨) is a public housing estate in Tin Shui Wai, New Territories, Hong Kong, near Tin Shui Wai Hospital, Tin Shui Wai Park and Light Rail Tin Shui stop. It is the second public housing estate in Tin Shui Wai New Town. It is divided into Tin Shui (I) Estate (Chinese: 天瑞(一)邨) and Tin Shui (II) Estate (Chinese: 天瑞(二)邨), and consists of 12 residential buildings completed in 1993.

Tin Oi Court (Chinese: 天愛苑) is a Home Ownership Scheme court in Tin Shui Wai, near Tin Shui Estate. It consists of two blocks built since 28 October 1993.

== Houses ==
=== Tin Shui (I) Estate ===
Name	Chinese name	Building type	Completed
Shui Lung House	瑞龍樓	Harmony 1	1993
Shui Sum House	瑞心樓	Harmony 1	1993
Shui Chuen House	瑞泉樓	Harmony 1	1993
Shui Yee House	瑞意樓	Harmony 1	1993
Shui Sing House	瑞勝樓	Harmony 1	1993
Shui Kwok House	瑞國樓	Harmony 2	1993
Shui Choi House	瑞財樓	Harmony 2	1993

=== Tin Shui (II) Estate ===
Name	Chinese name	Building type	Completed
Shui Fai House	瑞輝樓	Harmony 2	
Shui Fung House	瑞豐樓	Harmony 2	
Shui Moon House	瑞满樓	Harmony 1	1993
Shui Lam House	瑞林樓	Harmony 1	1993
Shui Yip House	瑞業樓	Harmony 1	1993

=== Tin Oi Court ===
Name	Chinese name	Building type	Completed
Oi Chiu House	愛潮閣	Harmony 1	1993
Oi Tao House	愛濤閣	Harmony 1	1993

== Demographics ==
According to the 2016 by-census, Tin Shui Estate had a population of 23,878 while Tin Oi Court had a population of 3,724. Altogether the population amounts to 27,602.

== Politics ==
For the 2019 District Council election, the estate fell within two constituencies. Most of the estate and Tin Oi Court is located in the Shui Oi constituency, which was formerly represented by Sandy Lai Po-wa until October 2021, while the remainder of the estate falls within the Shui Wah constituency, which was formerly represented by Lam Chun until July 2021.

== See also ==
- Public housing estates in Tin Shui Wai
