= Tin Shui =

Tin Shui may refer to:

- Tin Shui Estate, a public housing estate in Tin Shui Wai, Hong Kong
- Tin Shui stop, an MTR Light Rail stop adjacent to the estate
