= Tin Chung Court =

Public housing estate in Tin Shui Wai, Hong Kong

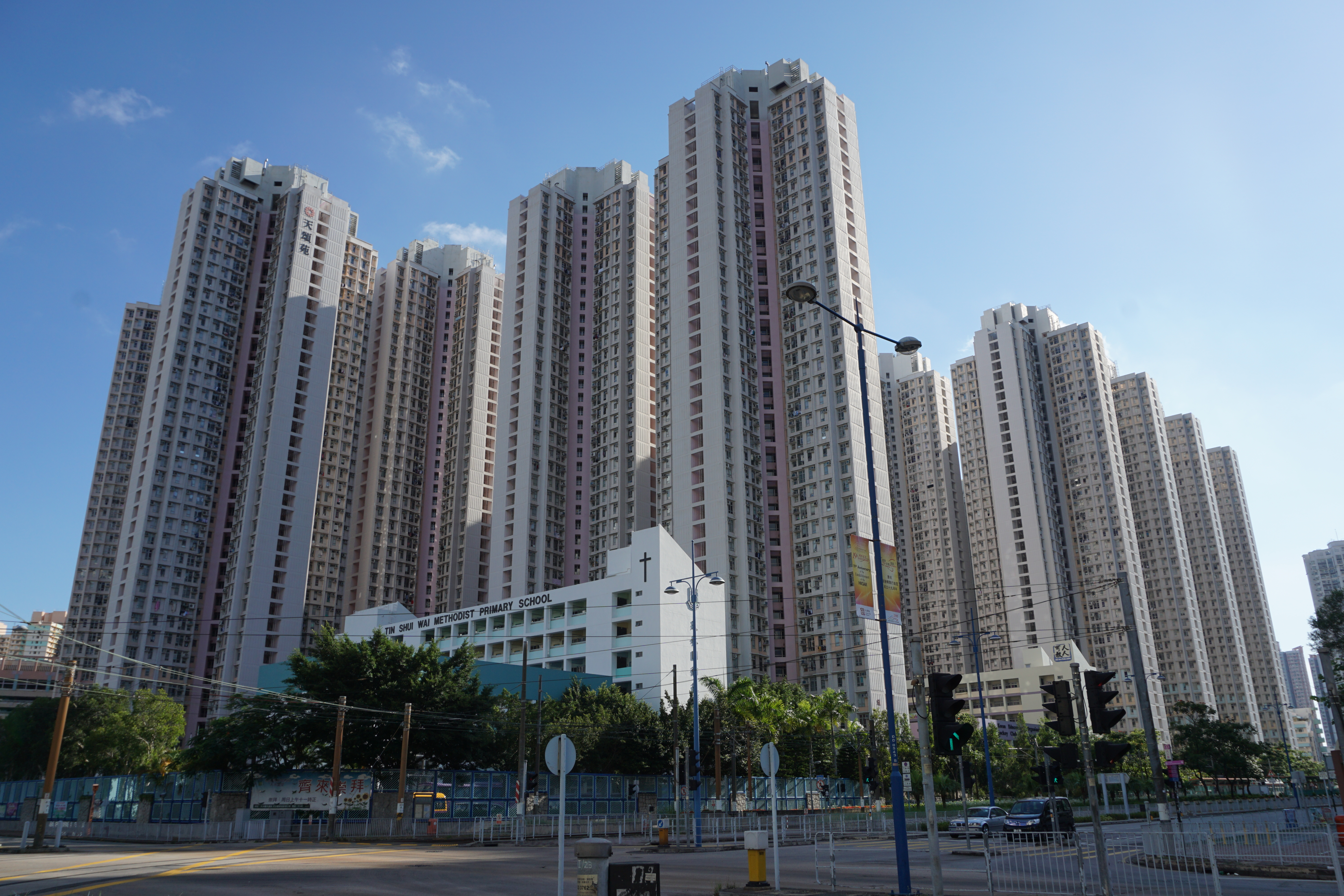
- Tin Chung Court
- Interactive map of Tin Chung Court

General information
- Location: 3 Tin Wing Road, Tin Shui Wai; New Territories, Hong Kong
- Coordinates: 22.4603786°N 114.0001005°E
- Status: Completed
- Category: Home Ownership Scheme
- Population: 18,044 (2016)
- No. of blocks: 15
- No. of units: 6,080

Construction
- Constructed: 1999; 27 years ago
- Authority: Hong Kong Housing Authority

Tin Chung Court (Chinese: 天頌苑) is a Home Ownership Scheme court developed by the Hong Kong Housing Authority in Tin Shui Wai, New Territories, Hong Kong, near Tin Wah Estate, Light Rail Chestwood stop and Tin Shui Wai Park. It comprises 15 residential blocks completed in 1999 and 2002 respectively.

== History ==
=== Short piling scandal ===
In 1999, the piles of Blocks K (Chung Po House) and L (Chung Ho House) were found to be shortened by up to seven meters compared with the standard requirement. Foundation strengthening works was then carried out in the block and completed in 2002. 640 units in the two blocks were sold to the public in 2009.

== Houses ==
Name	Chinese name	Building type	Completed
Chung Ting House (Block A)	頌亭閣	Concord 1 Option 2	1999
Chung Toi House (Block B)	頌臺閣	Concord 1 Option 2	1999
Chung Lau House (Block C)	頌流閣	Concord 1 Option 2	1999
Chung Shui House (Block D)	頌水閣	Concord 1 Option 2	1999
Chung Pik House (Block E)	頌碧閣	Concord 1 Option 2	1999
Chung Hoi House (Block F)	頌海閣	Concord 1 Option 1	2001
Chung Ying House (Block G)	頌映閣	Concord 1 Option 1	2001
Chung Yuet House (Block H)	頌月閣	Concord 1 Option 1	2001
Chung Yan House (Block J)	頌恩閣	Concord 1 Option 1	2001
Chung Po House (Block K)	頌波閣	Concord 1 Option 1	2008
Chung Ho House (Block L)	頌浩閣	Concord 1 Option 1	2008
Chung Chak House (Block M)	頌澤閣	Harmony 1 Option 7 (3.5 Generation)	1999
Chung Kam House (Block N)	頌琴閣	Harmony 1 Option 7 (3.5 Generation)	1999
Chung Ki House (Block O)	頌棋閣	Harmony 1 Option 7 (3.5 Generation)	1999
Chung Wa House (Block P)	頌畫閣	Harmony 1 Option 7 (3.5 Generation)	1999

== Demographics ==
According to the 2016 by-census, Tin Chung Court had a population of 18,044. The median age was 41.6 and the majority of residents (95.5 per cent) were of Chinese ethnicity. The average household size was 3.1 people. The median monthly household income of all households (i.e. including both economically active and inactive households) was HK$28,750.

== Politics ==
For the 2019 District Council election, the estate fell within two constituencies. Most of the estate is located in the Chung Wah constituency, which is represented by Chan Sze-nga. The remainder falls within the Chung Pak constituency, which is represented by Lee Wai-fung.

== See also ==
- Public housing estates in Tin Shui Wai
- List of Home Ownership Scheme Courts in Hong Kong
