= Tin Shui Wai Connection =

Tin Shui Wai Connection 天水連線
- Founded: 2019
- Ideology: Hong Kong localism Liberalism (Hong Kong); Tin Shui Wai regionalism
- Regional affiliation: Pro-democracy camp
- Colours: Green/navy
- Legislative Council: 0 / 90
- Yuen Long District Council: 0 / 46

Website
- Official Facebook page

Tin Shui Wai Connection (Chinese: 天水連線) is a local political group based in Tin Shui Wai founded in 2019 by a group of LIHKG netizens. In a historic pro-democracy landslide in 2019 District Council election, the group won four seats in the Yuen Long District Council.

== History ==
Tin Shui Wai Connection was formed by a group of five LIHKG netizens in their 20s who attempted to prevent pro-Beijing candidates from winning uncontestedly in the Yuen Long District Council constituencies in Tin Shui Wai in the 2019 District Council election, which were Hau Man-kin who intended to run in Tin Shing, Leung Chin-hang in Tin Yiu, Lam Chun in Shui Wah, Ng Kin-wai in Kingswood North and Kwan Chun-sang in Fu Yan.

Ex-member Leung Chin-hang who had run in the same constituency in the 2015 election faced another pro-democrat candidate, Ho Wai-pan of the Neighbourhood and Worker's Service Centre (NWSC). Two candidates ran in a primary ahead the election, but the result was seen invalid as it did not meet the 800-vote threshold. Leung quit the TSW Connection afterward and ran as an independent.

The rest of the candidates all won the election, gaining four seats in total and became the second largest political grouping in the Yuen Long District Council.

== Electoral performance ==
=== Yuen Long District Council elections ===
Election	Number of popular votes	% of popular votes	Total elected seats	+/−
2019	15,998	6.58	4 / 39	4 ▲
