= Chung Wah (constituency) =

Constituency in the Yuen Long District, Hong Kong

- Elected constituency for the Yuen Long District Council
- Boundary of Chung Wah in Yuen Long District
- District: Yuen Long
- Legislative Council constituency: New Territories North
- Population: 16,867 (2019)
- Electorate: 9,143 (2019)

Current constituency
- Created: 2003
- Number of members: One
- Member: vacant

Chung Wah (Chinese: 頌華) is one of the 39 constituencies in the Yuen Long District of Hong Kong.

The constituency returns one district councillor to the Yuen Long District Council, with an election every four years. Chung Wah constituency is loosely based on part of Tin Chung Court and part of Tin Wah Estate in Tin Shui Wai with estimated population of 16,867.

== Councillors represented ==
Election	Member	Party
2003	Liu Yam	YLTSWDA
2007	Fung Choi-yuk	DAB
2011	Wong Wai-ling	DAB
2019	Chan Sze-nga→Vacant	Nonpartisan

== Election results ==
=== 2010s ===
Yuen Long District Council Election, 2019: Chung Wah
Party	Candidate	Votes	%	±%
Nonpartisan	Chan Sze-nga	3,659	57.7	
DAB	Wong Wai-ling	2,680	42.3	−22.5
Majority		979	15.4	N/A
Turnout		6,339	69.3	+35.3
Nonpartisan gain from DAB		Swing		

Yuen Long District Council Election, 2015: Chung Wah
Party	Candidate	Votes	%	±%
DAB	Wong Wai-ling	1,775	64.8	−10.4
Nonpartisan	Chan Ka-kui	965	35.2	–
Majority		810	29.6	−20.7
Turnout		2,740	34.0	−0.1
DAB hold		Swing		

Yuen Long District Council Election, 2011: Chung Wah
Party	Candidate	Votes	%	±%
DAB	Wong Wai-ling	1,349	75.2	+35.4
People Power	Liu Yam	446	24.8	−9.4
Majority		903	50.3	+44.7
Turnout		1795	34.1	+0.4
DAB hold		Swing	+22.4	

=== 2000s ===
Yuen Long District Council Election, 2007: Chung Wah
Party	Candidate	Votes	%	±%
DAB	Fung Choi-yuk	1,164	39.8	+2.5
Democratic Alliance	Liu Yam	1,000	34.2	−6.8
Nonpartisan	Chan Chi-fui	543	18.6	–
Liberal	Zachary Lo Kwok-yeung	220	7.5	–
Majority		164	5.6	N/A
Turnout		2927	33.7	−5.8
DAB gain from Democratic Alliance		Swing	-4.65	

Yuen Long District Council Election, 2003: Chung Wah
Party	Candidate	Votes	%	±%
Democratic Alliance	Liu Yam	1,218	41.0	N/A
DAB	Siu Long-ming	1,108	37.3	N/A
Nonpartisan	Tse Kui-sing	643	21.7	N/A
Majority		110	3.7	N/A
Turnout		2,969	39.5	N/A
Democratic Alliance win (new seat)				
