= Ng Kin-wai =

Hong Kong social activist and former member of the Yuen Long District Council

- 伍健偉
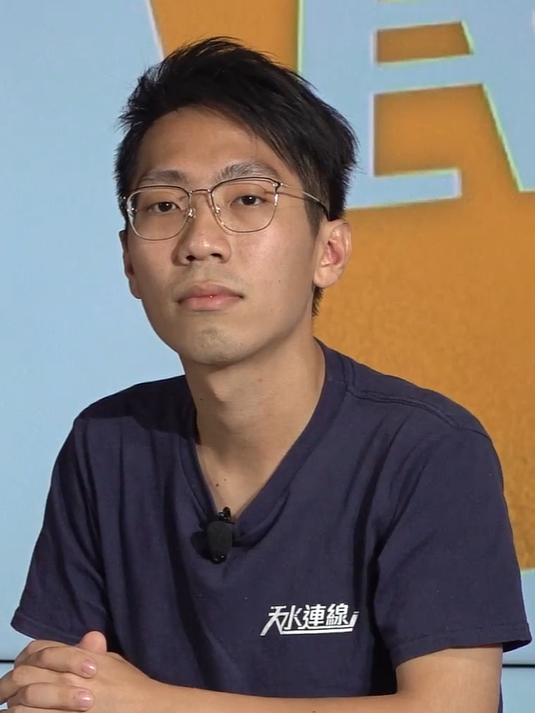
- Ng in 2020

Member of the Yuen Long District Council
- In office 1 January 2020 – 9 May 2021
- Preceded by: Lee Yuet-man
- Constituency: Kingswood North

Personal details
- Born: September 6, 1995 (age 30) British Hong Kong
- Citizenship: Hong Kong
- Party: Tin Shui Wai Connection

Ng Kin-wai (Chinese: 伍健偉; born 6 September 1995) is a Hong Kong social activist and former member of the Yuen Long District Council for Kingswood North. He is currently convenor of the Tin Shui Wai Connection.

== Biography ==
Raised in Yuen Long, Ng formed Tin Shui Wai Connection with other Tin Shui Wai netizens in 2019 aiming at contesting in the 2019 District Council election against the pro-Beijing incumbents. Ng ran against pro-Beijing incumbent Lee Yuet-man in Kingswood North and received 4,371 votes, winning the seat by a narrow margin of 165 votes.

Ng ran in the pro-democracy primaries for the 2020 Legislative Council election in the New Territories West constituency. He came in fourth by receiving 20,525 votes, surpassing veteran and incumbent democrats was nominated as one of the six candidates in the general election.

Including Ng, at least 53 pro-democracy activists were arrested on 6 January 2021 morning over their organisation and participation in the primaries. Ng was released on bail on 7 January but his bail was then revoked in March.

Political offices
Preceded by Lee Yuet-man	Member of Yuen Long District Council; Representative for Kingswood North; 2020–2021	Vacant
