= Chung Pak (constituency) =

Constituency in Yuen Long District, Hong Kong

- Elected constituency for the Yuen Long District Council
- Boundary of Chung Pak in Yuen Long District
- District: Yuen Long
- Legislative Council constituency: New Territories North
- Population: 15,741 (2019)
- Electorate: 8,555 (2019)

Current constituency
- Created: 2011
- Number of members: One
- Member: Vacant

Chung Pak (Chinese: 頌栢) is one of the 39 constituencies in the Yuen Long District of Hong Kong.

The constituency returns one district councillor to the Yuen Long District Council, with an election every four years. Chung Pak constituency is loosely based on Central Park Towers and part of Tin Chung Court in Tin Shui Wai with estimated population of 15,741.

== Councillors represented ==
Election	Member	Party
2011	Wong Cheuk-kin	NPP
2019	Wong Cheuk-kin	Nonpartisan
2019	Lee Wai-fung→Vacant	TSWLPU

== Election results ==
=== 2010s ===
Yuen Long District Council Election, 2019: Chung Pak
Party	Candidate	Votes	%	±%
Democratic Coalition	Lee Wai-fung	3,249	55.6	+15.7
Nonpartisan	Kwok Ching-yin	2,404	41.2	–
Nonpartisan	Cheung Kwok-tung	187	3.2	–
Majority		845	14.5	–
Turnout		5,840	68.3	+18.3
Democratic Coalition gain from Nonpartisan		Swing		

Yuen Long District Council Election, 2015: Chung Pak
Party	Candidate	Votes	%	±%
NPP	Wong Cheuk-kin	2,078	60.1	+20.9
Democratic Coalition	Mok Yim-hay	1,380	39.9	–
Majority		698	20.2	+10.1
Turnout		3,458	50.0	+7.9
NPP hold		Swing		

Yuen Long District Council Election, 2011: Chung Pak
Party	Candidate	Votes	%	±%
NPP	Wong Cheuk-kin	1,032	39.2	N/A
Nonpartisan	Tse Kui-sing	745	28.3	N/A
Nonpartisan	Thomas Li Tsz-keung	391	14.8	N/A
Democratic	Victor Yeung Sai-cheong	349	13.2	N/A
Liberal	Chan Wai-man	117	4.4	N/A
Majority		287	10.1	N/A
Turnout		2,634	42.1	N/A
NPP win (new seat)				
