= Shui Oi (constituency) =

Hong Kong constituency

- Elected constituency for the Yuen Long District Council
- Boundary of Shui Oi in Yuen Long District
- District: Yuen Long
- Legislative Council constituency: New Territories North
- Population: 17,756 (2019)
- Electorate: 12,025 (2019)

Current constituency
- Created: 1994
- Number of members: One
- Member: Vacant

Shui Oi (Chinese: 瑞愛) is one of the 39 constituencies in the Yuen Long District of Hong Kong.

The constituency returns one district councillor to the Yuen Long District Council, with an election every four years. Shui Oi constituency is loosely based on Tin Oi Court and part of Tin Shui Estate in Tin Shui Wai with estimated population of 17,756.

== Councillors represented ==
Election	Member	Party
1994	Kwok Keung	Nonpartisan
1997	Kwok Keung	DAB
2019	Sandy Lai Po-wa→Vacant	Democratic

== Election results ==
=== 2010s ===
Yuen Long District Council Election, 2019: Shui Oi
Party	Candidate	Votes	%	±%
Democratic	Sandy Lai Po-wa	4,605	53.73	
DAB	Tong Tak-chun	3,005	46.27	
Nonpartisan	Wong Chi-fai	960	11.20	
Majority		1,600	7.46	
Turnout		8,597	71.56	
Democratic gain from DAB		Swing		
