= Kingswood Villas =

Housing estate in Tin Shui Wai, Hong Kong

Coordinates: 22.460°N 114.005°E

- Chinese: 嘉湖山莊
- Cantonese Yale: gā wùh sāan jōng
Transcriptions
Standard Mandarin
- Hanyu Pinyin: Jiāhú Shānzhuāng
Yue: Cantonese
- Yale Romanization: gā wùh sāan jōng
- Jyutping: gaa1 wu4 saan1 zong1

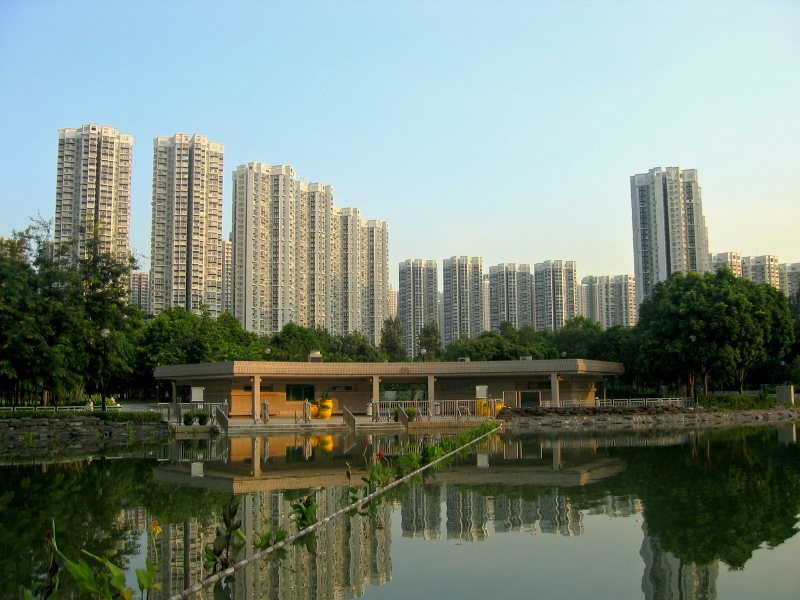
Kingswood Villas

Map of Kingswood Villas

Kingswood Villas (Chinese: 嘉湖山莊) is a private housing estate in Tin Shui Wai, New Territories, Hong Kong. It has a total of 58 residential blocks and 15,808 units in six phases. It is the first private housing estate in Tin Shui Wai and one of the largest private housing estates in Hong Kong. It was developed by Cheung Kong Holdings from 1991 to 1999.

== Phases ==
- Phase 1: Locwood Court (Chinese: 樂湖居; Jyutping: lok6 wu4 geoi1)
- Phase 2: Sherwood Court (Chinese: 賞湖居; Jyutping: soeng2 wu4 geoi1)
- Phase 3: Chestwood Court (Chinese: 翠湖居; Jyutping: ceoi3 wu4 geoi1)
- Phase 4: Kingswood Ginza (Chinese: 嘉湖銀座; Jyutping: gaa1 wu4 ngan4 zo6)
- Phase 5: Lynwood Court (Chinese: 麗湖居; Jyutping: lai6 wu4 geoi1)
- Phase 6: Maywood Court (Chinese: 美湖居; Jyutping: mei5 wu4 geoi1)
- Phase 7: Kenswood Court (Chinese: 景湖居; Jyutping: ging2 wu4 geoi1)
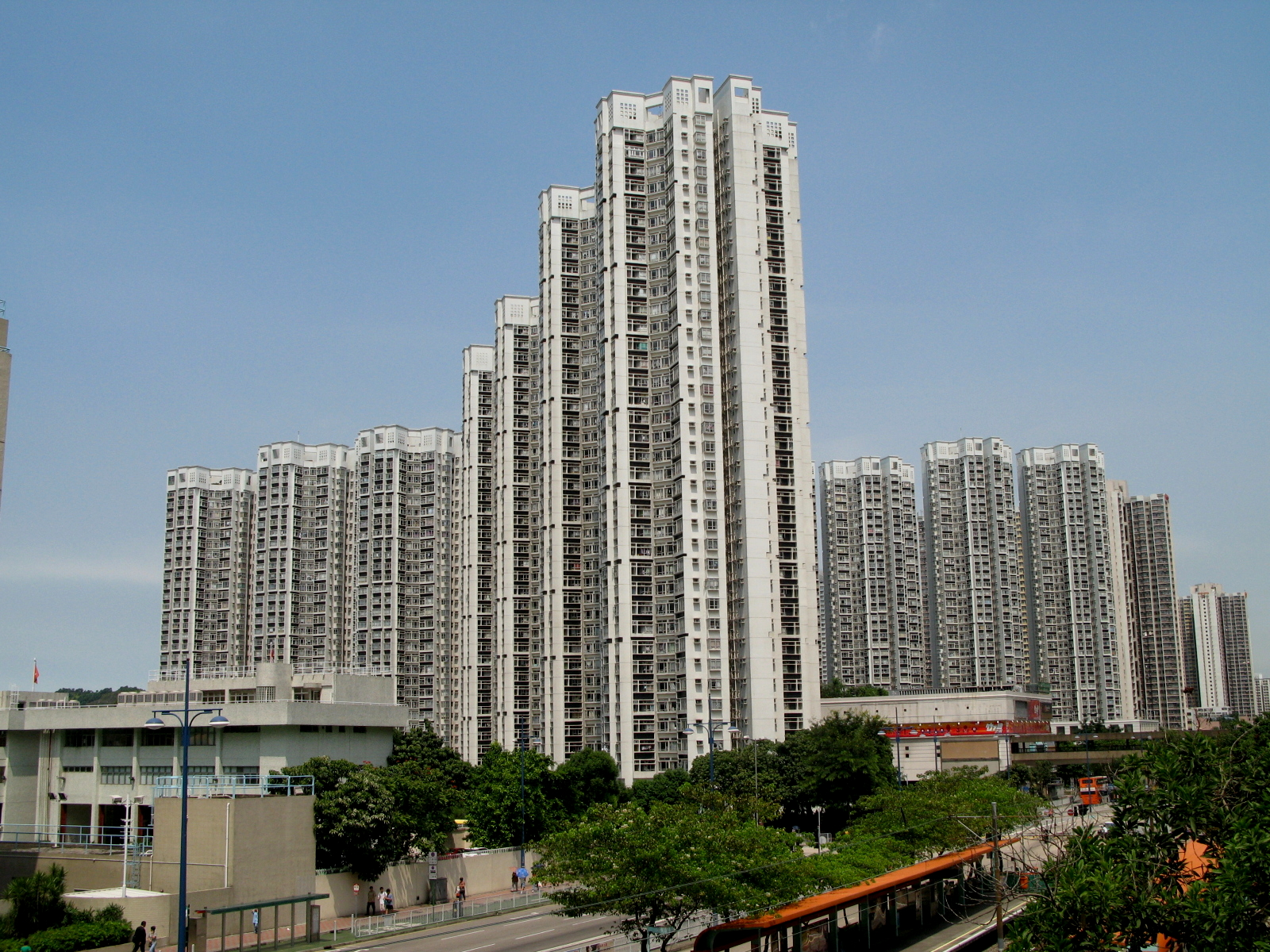
Phase 1 (Locwood Court)

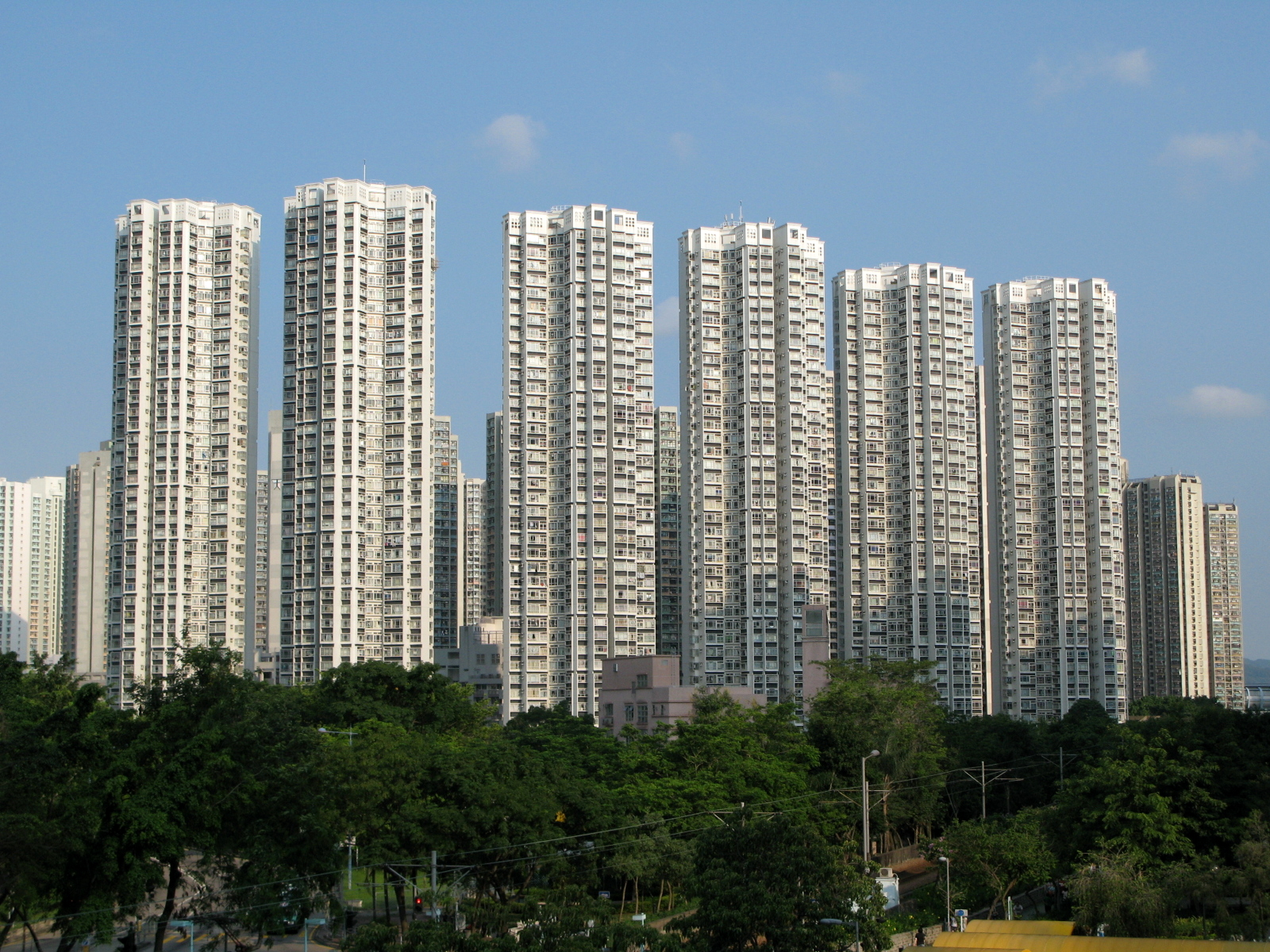
Phase 2 (Sherwood Court)

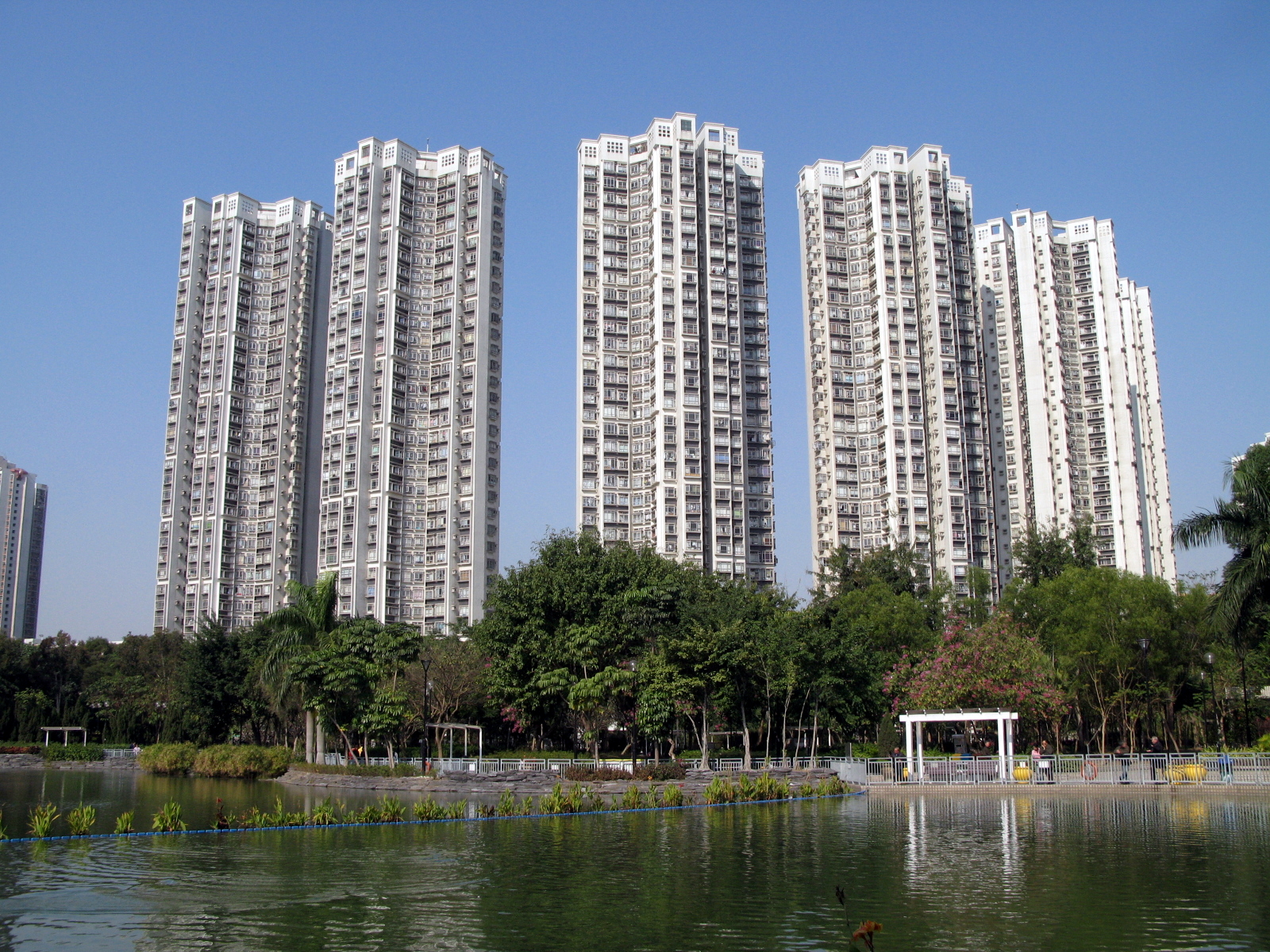
Phase 3 (Chestwood Court)

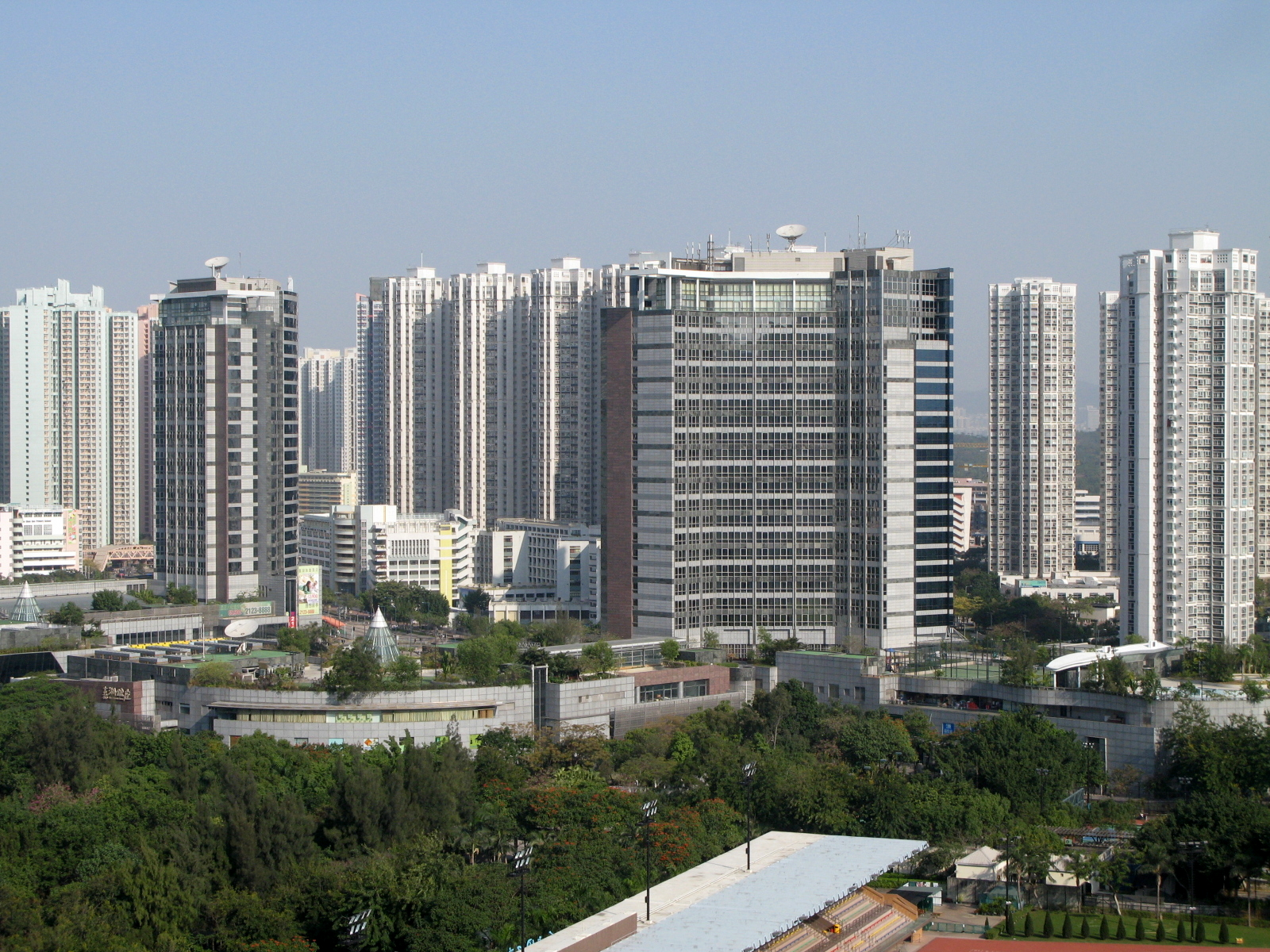
Phase 4 (Kingswood Ginza)

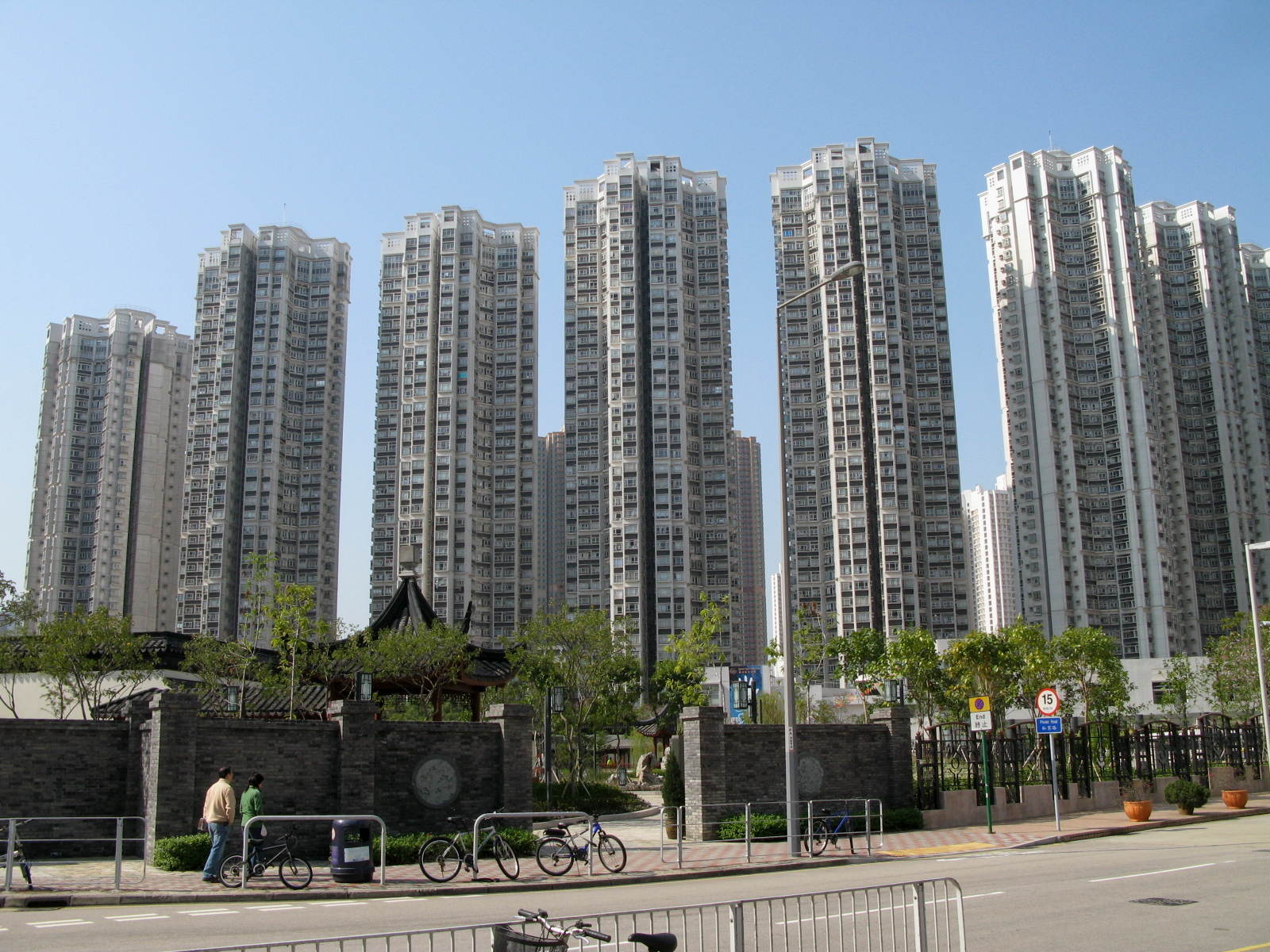
Phase 5 (Lynwood Court)

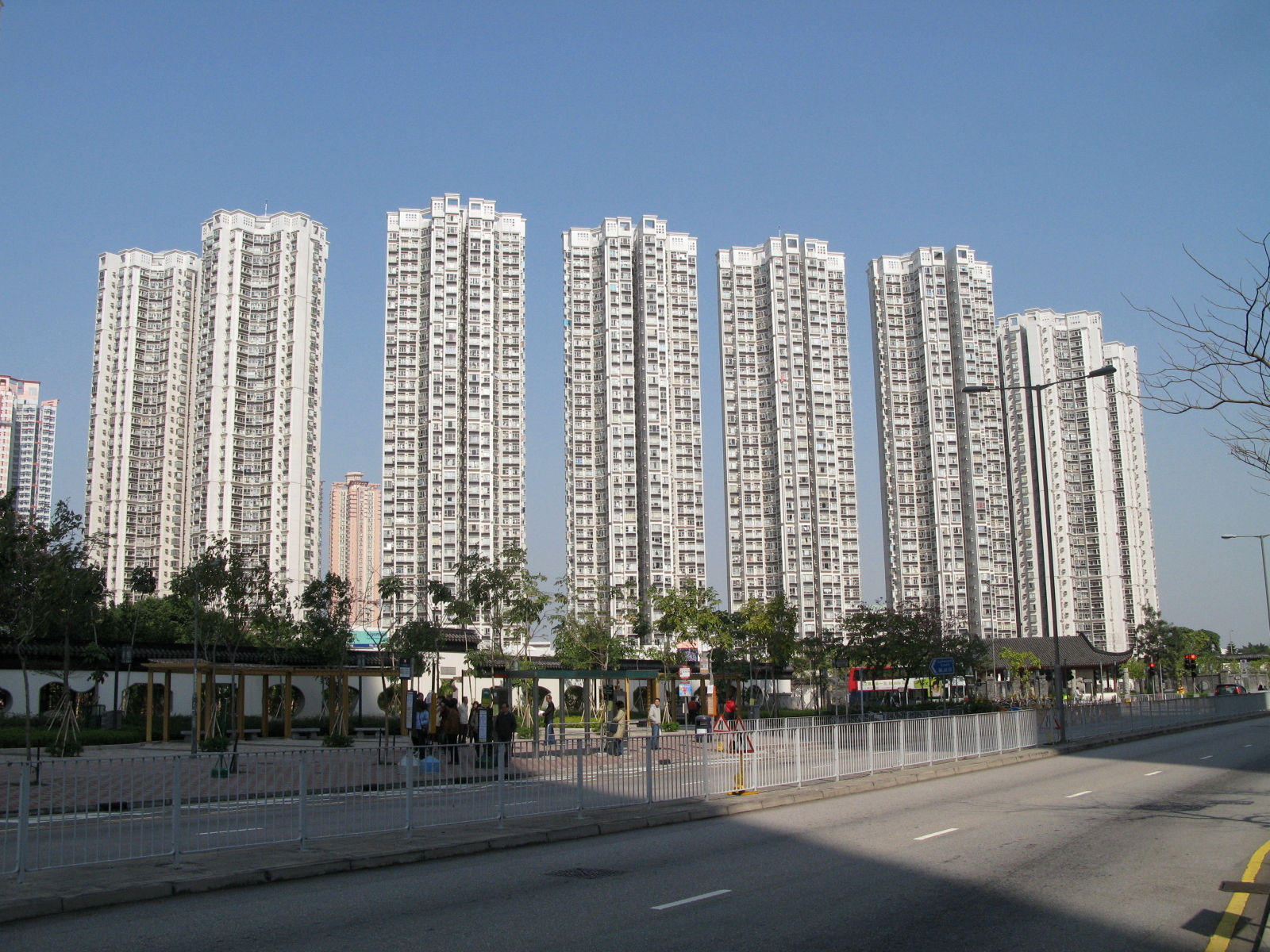
Phase 6 (Maywood Court)

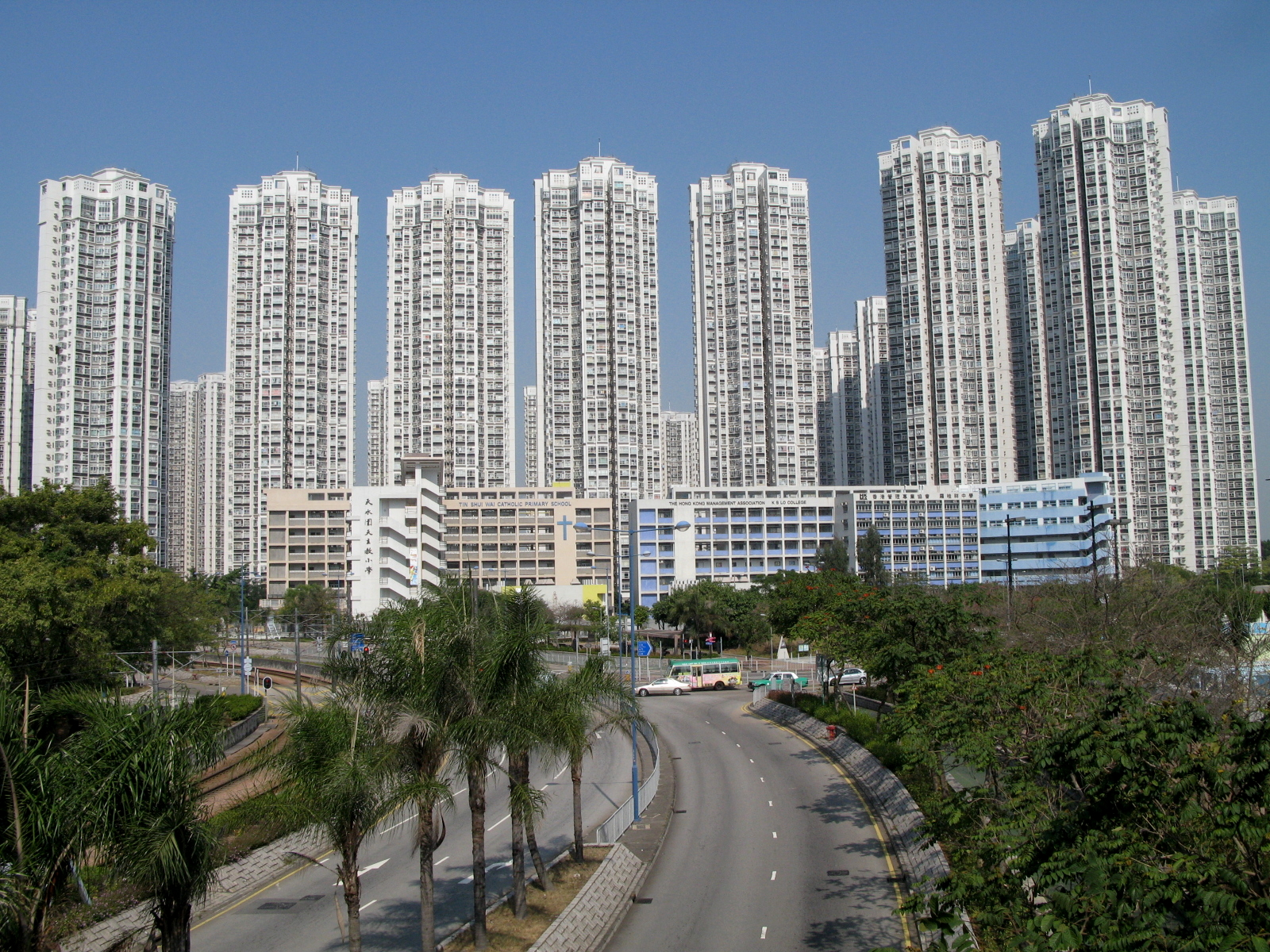
Phase 7 (Kenswood Court)

== Demographics ==
In the 2016 by-census, the population of the estate was recorded as 39,964. The median age of the residents was 44.4, slightly more than the Hong Kong-wide figure of 43.4.

== Transportation ==
- Light Rail
  - Locwood stop (for Locwood Court and Sherwood Court)
  - Chestwood stop (for Chestwood Court)
  - Tin Wing stop (for Lynwood Court)
  - Ginza stop (for Maywood Court, Kingswood Court and +WOO)
- Residential Service Bus
  - There are several non-franchised residential bus routes between Kingswood Villas and urban districts, which started operations in 1991. It was originally operated by Citybus. But Citybus decided to withdraw all routes and Kwoon Chung Motors replaced Citybus to operate them in 2006.
