= Tin Shing (constituency) =

Hong Kong constituency

- Elected constituency for the Yuen Long District Council
- Boundary of Tin Shing in Yuen Long District
- District: Yuen Long
- Legislative Council constituency: New Territories North
- Population: 14,278 (2019)
- Electorate: 8,504 (2019)

Current constituency
- Created: 2003
- Number of members: One
- Member: Vacant

Tin Shing (Chinese: 天盛) is one of the 39 constituencies in the Yuen Long District of Hong Kong.

The constituency returns one district councillor to the Yuen Long District Council, with an election every four years. Tin Shing constituency is loosely based on part of Tin Shing Court in Tin Shui Wai with estimated population of 14,278.

== History ==
Tin Shing was established as one of constituencies in 2003. Formerly the constituency include the whole area of Tin Shing Court.

As the constituency population exceeding and the construction of Ping Yan Court was completed in 2018. The constituency boundary was redrawn and Block A, B, C, D and G in Tin Shing Court were excluded in the constituency.

== Councillors represented ==
Election	Member	Party
2003	Chan Wai-ching	Nonpartisan
2011	Chan Sze-ching	Liberal
2013	Chan Sze-ching	NPP
2017	Chan Sze-ching	Roundtable
2019	Hau Man-kin→Vacant	TSW Connection

== Election results ==
=== 2010s ===
Yuen Long District Council Election, 2019: Tin Shing
Party	Candidate	Votes	%	±%
TSW Connection	Hau Man-kin	3,347	54.18	
Roundtable	Chan Sze-ching	2,830	45.82	
Majority		517	8.36	
Turnout		6,203	72.95	
TSW Connection gain from Roundtable		Swing		
