= Census and Statistics Department =

Hong Kong government department

- 政府統計處

Agency overview
- Formed: 4 December 1967
- Jurisdiction: Government of Hong Kong
- Headquarters: 21/F., Wanchai Tower, 12 Harbour Road, Wan Chai, Hong Kong
- Employees: 1,298 (March 2010)
- Annual budget: 553.4m HKD (2009–10)
- Agency executive: Ms Marion Chan Sui-yu, Commissioner for Census and Statistics
- Parent agency: Financial Services and the Treasury Bureau
- Website: www.censtatd.gov.hk

Census and Statistics Department
- Traditional Chinese: 政府統計處
- Simplified Chinese: 政府统计处
Transcriptions
Standard Mandarin
- Hanyu Pinyin: Zhèngfǔ Tǒngjì Chù
Yue: Cantonese
- Yale Romanization: Jing fú túng gai chyu
- Jyutping: Zing^{3} fu^{2} tung^{2} gai^{3} cyu^{3}

The Census and Statistics Department (C&SD; Chinese: 政府統計處) is the provider of major social and economic official statistics in Hong Kong. It is also responsible for conducting Population Census and By-census in Hong Kong since 1971. Its head office is in the Wanchai Tower in Wan Chai.

== Antecedent ==
The history of population censuses in Hong Kong can be traced back to the 1840s. According to early government records, the first set of census results were published in the 2nd issue of H.K. Govt. Gazette (1841 May). Regular population censuses have been taken ever since, except for the main gap between 1931 and 1961. In addition to population censuses, other statistics like number of ships entered, trade tonnage, public revenue and expenditure, death rate for European and American residents, number of schools, school attendance, number of prisoners and police strength were collected through various government departments in a scattered fashion.

In 1947, a Department of Statistics was set up under W. G. Wormal to organize a statistical system, working on such matters as retail price index and trade statistics. With the abortion of the idea of a population census scheduled for 1948 due to great fluctuations in the population in those few years, the Department of Statistics was disbanded in 1952. In its place a Statistics Branch was set up in the then Commerce and Industry Department headed by C. T. Stratton. Its work mainly concentrated on economic statistics, in particular trade statistics.

In 1959, following the decision to hold a population census in 1961, a temporary Census Department was set up with K. M. A. Barnett as Commissioner. It was disbanded in 1962 after the completion of the census operation. In 1963, Barnett was appointed Commissioner of Census and Statistical Planning in an office forming part of the then Colonial Secretariat with the immediate task of preparing a report on the statistics in Hong Kong and subsequently the further task of conducting a by-census in 1966. It was only following recommendations made by Barnett that the Census and Statistics Department was formally established in 1967 December.

== Major historical events ==
Year	Major events
1967	Census and Statistics Department (C&SD) set up in December, with two operational divisions, viz. the Economic Statistics Division and the Social Statistics Division. K.M.A. Barnett appointed first Commissioner for Census and Statistics. Department accommodated in Fire Brigade Building and United Chinese Bank Building, both at Des Voeux Road Central.
1970	K.W.J. Topley appointed Commissioner for Census and Statistics.
1971	Hong Kong Population and Housing Census 1971 conducted.
1973	First report on estimates of gross domestic product covering the period 1966–71 published. D.S. Whitelegge appointed Commissioner for Census and Statistics.
1975	First Labour Force Survey conducted.
1976	Hong Kong By-Census 1976 conducted.
1978	The Census and Statistics Ordinance came into effect. C.C. Greenfield appointed Commissioner for Census and Statistics.
1981	Hong Kong 1981 Census conducted.
1984	First set of production-based Gross Domestic Product estimates for all major economic sectors published, covering the period 1980–82.
1986	Hong Kong 1986 By-Census conducted. R. Butler appointed Commissioner for Census and Statistics.
1988	Mok Ni-hung, Benjamin appointed Commissioner for Census and Statistics. First local Chinese appointed to the position.
1990	The Census and Statistics Ordinance amended, enhancing protection of confidentiality of data supplied by individual persons and firms in surveys.
1991	Hong Kong 1991 Population Census conducted.
1992	Ho Wing-huen, Frederick appointed Commissioner for Census and Statistics.
1995	First set of Gross National Product (GNP) estimates for Hong Kong released.
1996	1996 Population By-census conducted.
1997	The Government of the People's Republic of China resumed its exercise of sovereignty over Hong Kong on 1 July 1997. On this date, the Hong Kong Special Administrative Region (HKSAR) was formed under the "One Country, Two Systems" principle. In respect of statistical work, HKSAR would maintain its separate statistical systems and continue to compile and disseminate statistical data about the HKSAR.
2000	First set of complete Balance of Payments account for Hong Kong released.
2001	2001 Population Census conducted.
2005	8 August 2005, Fung Hing-wang appointed Commissioner for Census and Statistics.
2006	2006 Population By-Census conducted. Free download policy launched to enable statistical data users to acquired download versions of statistical publications and statistical tables of the department free of charge via the Internet.
2007	C&SD obtained the endorsement from the International Statistical Institute (ISI) for hosting the 59th ISI World Statistics Congress (WSC) in Hong Kong in 2013.
2011	2011 Population Census was conducted (2011 Jun 30 – 2 Aug). Mrs Lily Ou-yang succeeded Mr Fung Hing-wang as Commissioner for Census and Statistics with effect from 24 September 2011.
2014	Mr Leslie Tang Wai-kong succeeded Mrs Lily Ou-yang as Commissioner for Census and Statistics with effect from 11 May 2014.
2019	Ms Marion Chan Sui-yu succeeded Mr Leslie Tang Wai-kong as Commissioner for Census and Statistics with effect from 26 July 2019.

== Organisation and Management ==
=== Government Statistical Service ===
C&SD together with statistical units established in various government departments and bureaux form the Government Statistical Service (GSS). The latter are generally called the "outposted statistical units".

Broadly speaking, most general-purpose statistics come under the responsibility of C&SD. The statistical units in various government departments and bureaux will take care of specific-purpose statistics (for dedicated use in their respective work) and provide necessary support in the application of statistics.

The Commissioner for Census and Statistics is the Government's principal adviser on all statistical matters and the head of the GSS. On the one hand, he fulfills his responsibilities by being the head of C&SD and, on the other hand, co-ordinates the work of outposted statistical units and monitors their technical standards. He is assisted by a Deputy Commissioner and five Assistant Commissioners in discharging his duties. The current Commissioner is Mr Leo YU Chun-keung and Deputy Commissioner is Mr CHAU Kam-tim.

=== Work of the C&SD ===
The work of C&SD can be classified into three categories:

- Conducting statistical surveys and operating statistical systems for the production of social and economic statistics including data series on such areas as population, external trade, commerce and industry, labour, prices, national income and Balance of Payments;
- Performing statistical analysis and disseminating statistical data and analytical results; and
- Providing consultation and support services on statistical matters to various government departments.

=== Organisation and Functions ===
C&SD is organised into five divisions. The functions of these five divisions, each headed by an Assistant Commissioner, are :

a. Economic Statistics Division (1): This Division deals with external merchandise trade statistics, price statistics and household and income statistics;

b. Economic Statistics Division (2): This Division deals with sectoral economic statistics, statistics on science and technology, and statistics on companies in Hong Kong with parent companies located outside Hong Kong. It also handles publication matters and organises human resources development activities for statistical grade staff;

c. Economic Statistics Division (3): This Division deals with national income statistics and Balance of Payments statistics. It also provides support in applications of information technology and handles data dissemination matters for the department;

d. Social Statistics Division: This Division deals with demographic and other social statistics; plans and executes population censuses and conducts social surveys; and

e. Labour Statistics Division: This Division deals with labour statistics and undertakes surveys of employment, labour force, payroll, wages and manpower.

In addition, there are three branches directly supervised by the Deputy Commissioner, namely Technical Secretariat, Development Branch and Administration Branch.

== Census and Statistics Ordinance ==
The main law governing the work of the C&SD is the Census and Statistics Ordinance, which provides for the taking of a census of population and the collection, compilation and publication of statistical information concerning Hong Kong and for matters connected therewith. The Ordinance also provides strict safeguards on the confidentiality of data pertaining to individuals or undertakings.

== Statistics Advisory Board ==
To ensure that the needs of various sectors of the community can be suitably taken into account in the development of government statistical activities, a Statistics Advisory Board was established by the Government in 1972. The Board is a non-statutory advisory body chaired by the Commissioner for Census and Statistics and consists of 11 non-official members and 3 official members. The non-official members offers a balanced representation from businesses, the academia and the community.

== Official Statistics of Hong Kong ==
Official statistics of Hong Kong comprise statistics compiled and released by various agencies of the Hong Kong Government. Broadly speaking, statistics which are of a general purpose and useful to various functional areas are mainly compiled by the C&SD while those relating to more specific functional areas are compiled by subject government bureaux/departments concerned. Official statistics of Hong Kong can be classified into different subjects, namely

Subject	Key statistics covered
Population and vital events	Population estimates, number of births, number of deaths, number of marriages, etc.
Labour	Labour force, labour force participation rate, number of employed persons, number of unemployed persons, unemployment rate, etc.
External trade	External merchandise trade aggregate figures, merchandise trade index, trade in services, etc.
Industrial production	Index of industrial production, producer price index, labour productivity index, etc.
Business Performance	Operating statistics of individual industry sectors, restaurant receipts, retail sales, business receipts for service industries, producer price indices for selected service industries, number of regional headquarters and local offices in Hong Kong, etc.
Science and Technology	Statistics on penetration and usage of information technology in the business sector, research and development expenditure and personnel, business receipts from selling goods, services or information through electronic means etc.
Land, Building, Construction and Real Estate	Gross value of construction work, index numbers of the costs of labour and materials used in public sector construction projects, operating statistics of construction and related industries, etc.
Housing and Property	Statistics on public and private housing, housing rental and price indices, statistics on sales transaction, etc.
Transport, Communications and Tourism	Cargo throughput, motor vehicle licensed, public transport passenger journeys, movements of aircraft and ocean vessels, arrivals and departures of passengers, statistics on telecommunication and internet services, visitor arrivals, etc.
Government Accounts, Finance and Insurance	Currencies in circulation, money supply, exchange rates, effective exchange rate index, government revenue and spending, etc.
Prices	Consumer price index, average monthly expenditure by commodity, etc.
Education	Number of educational and training institutions, student enrolment, ional attainment of population, government expenditure on education, etc.
Health	Statistics on communicable diseases, birth rate, mortality rate, death rate, deaths by leading causes, etc.
Social Welfare	Social welfare personnel, government expenditure on social welfare, services for the elders and young people, medical social services, etc.
Law and Order	Crime statistics, number of traffic accidents and casualties, number of reported drug abusers, number of corruption reports, etc.
Culture, Entertainment and Recreation	Number of recreation and sports facilities, number of attendance in museums, library stock and usage of public libraries, etc.
Environment, Climate and Geography	Water consumption, air quality statistics, air pollutants and greenhouse gases emission inventory, quantities of solid waste disposed, monthly weather summary, land usages, etc.
Energy	Electricity production, electricity consumption, consumption of gas, retained imports of oil products, etc.
National Income and Balance of Payments	Gross Domestic Products, Gross National Products, Balance of Payment, etc.

== See also ==
- Census in Hong Kong
