= Hau Man-kin =

- 侯文健

Member of the Yuen Long District Council
- In office 1 January 2020 – 8 July 2021
- Preceded by: Chan Sze-ching
- Constituency: Tin Shing

Personal details
- Born: May 2, 1992 (age 33) British Hong Kong
- Citizenship: Hong Kong
- Party: Tin Shui Wai Connection

Hau Man-kin (Chinese: 侯文健; born 2 May 1992) is a Hong Kong social activist and former member of the Yuen Long District Council for Tin Shing. He is formerly a covenor of the Tin Shui Wai Connection.

== Biography ==
Raised in Yuen Long, Kwan formed Tin Shui Wai Connection with other Tin Shui Wai netizens in 2019 aiming at contesting in the 2019 District Council election against the pro-Beijing incumbents. Kwan ran against pro-Beijing incumbent Lau Kwai-yung in Tin Shing and received 3,347 votes, winning the seat by a narrow margin of 517 votes.

Political offices
Preceded by Chan Sze-ching	Member of Yuen Long District Council; Representative for Tin Shing; 2020–present	Incumbent
