= Shui Wah (constituency) =

Constitutioncy in Hong Kong

- Elected constituency for the Yuen Long District Council
- Boundary of Shui Wah in Yuen Long District
- District: Yuen Long
- Legislative Council constituency: New Territories North
- Population: 14,960 (2019)
- Electorate: 9,911 (2019)

Current constituency
- Created: 1994
- Number of members: One
- Member: Vacant

Shui Wah (Chinese: 瑞華) is one of the 39 constituencies in the Yuen Long District of Hong Kong.

The constituency returns one district councillor to the Yuen Long District Council, with an election every four years. Shui Wah constituency is loosely based on part of Tin Shui Estate and part of Tin Wah Estate in Tin Shui Wai with estimated population of 14,960.

== Councillors represented ==
| Election | Member | Party |
|---|---|---|
| 1994 | Chow Wing-kan | Nonpartisan |
| 199? | Chow Wing-kan | Progressive Alliance |
| 2007 | Chow Wing-kan | Liberal |
| 2016 | Chow Wing-kan | Nonpartisan |
| 2019 | Lam Chun→Vacant | TSW Connection |

== Election results ==
=== 2010s ===
Yuen Long District Council Election, 2019: Shui Wah
| Party | Candidate | Votes | % | ±% |
|---|---|---|---|---|
| TSW Connection | Lam Chun | 3,955 | 58.62 | |
| Nonpartisan | Chow Wing-kan | 2,264 | 33.56 | |
| Nonpartisan | Wong Chi-ngai | 528 | 7.83 | |
| Majority | | 1,691 | 25.06 | |
| Turnout | | 6,778 | 68.42 | |
| TSW Connection gain from Nonpartisan | | Swing | | |
