= Ping Yan Court =

Housing estate in Ping Shan, Hong Kong

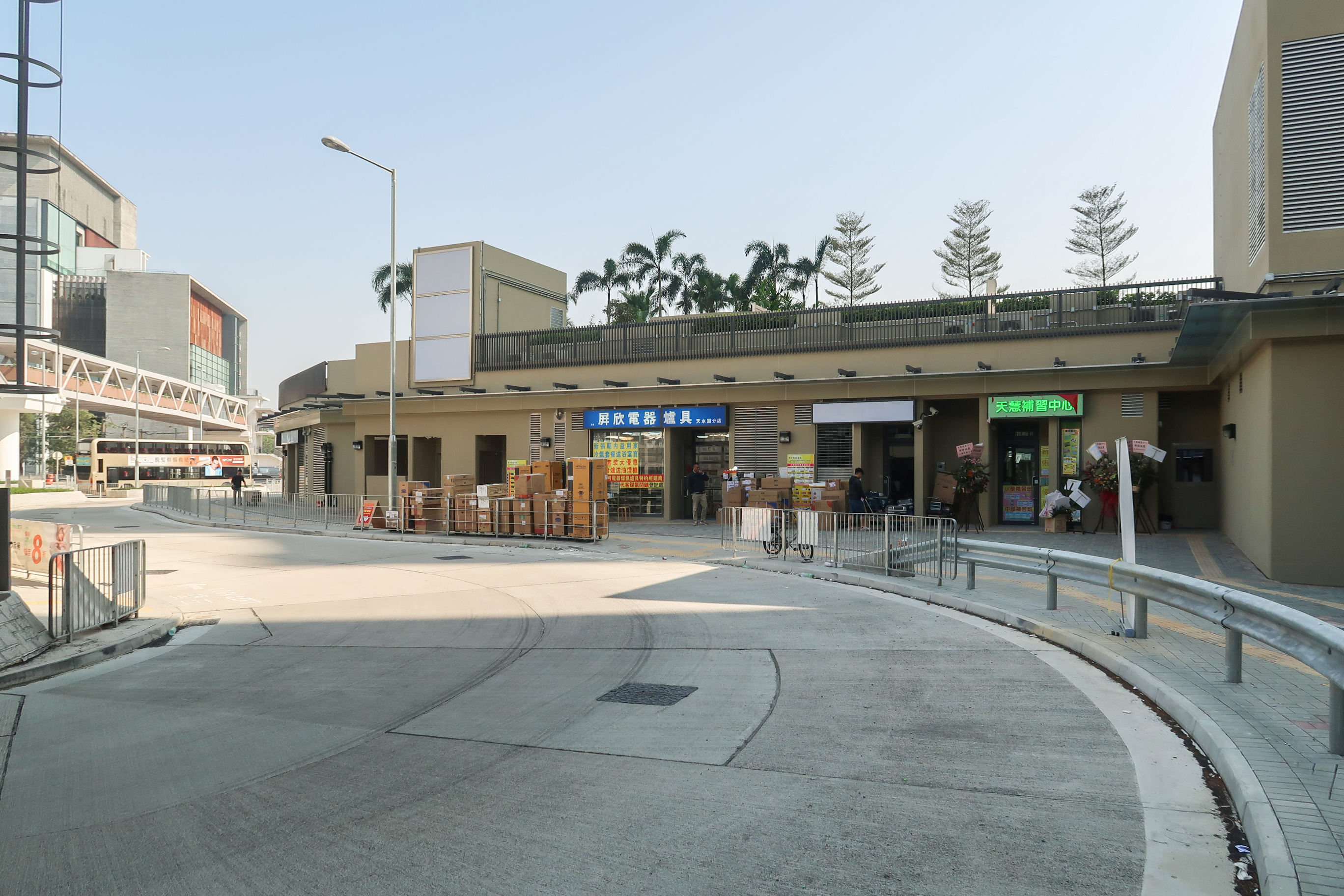
Tutorial centre and electric shop in Ping Yan Shopping Centre

Ping Yan Court (Chinese: 屏欣苑) is a private estate developed by the Hong Kong Housing Authority at 65 Ping Ha Road, Ping Shan, Yuen Long District, New Territories, Hong Kong.

It has three 35-storey domestic blocks with 2,409 flats in total. It is located at Ping Shan rather than Tin Shui Wai and is next to MTR Tin Shui Wai station and Tin Shing Court.

== Blocks ==
| Name | Type | Completion |
|---|---|---|
| Ping Oi House (Block A) | Non-standard block | 2018 |
| Ping Yin House (Block B) | Non-standard block | 2018 |
| Ping Tai House (Block C) | Non-standard block | 2018 |
