= Lam Chun =

- 林進
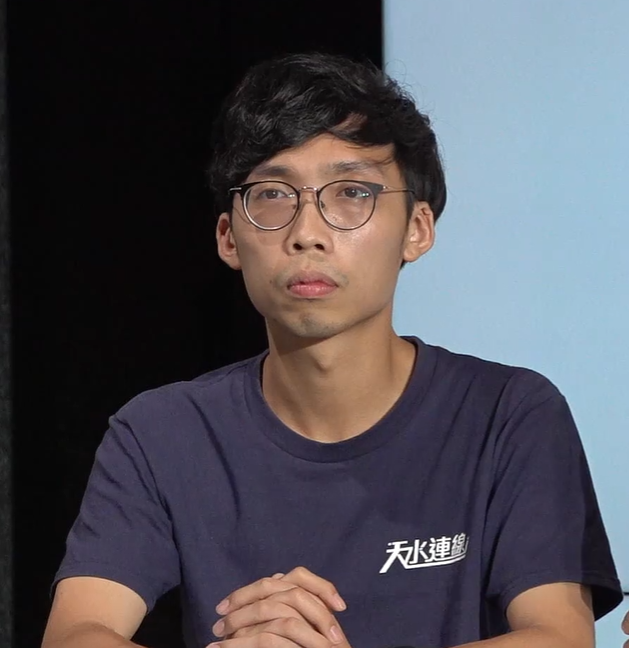
- Lam in 2020

Member of the Yuen Long District Council
- In office 1 January 2020 – 8 July 2021
- Preceded by: Chow Wing-kan
- Constituency: Shui Wah

Personal details
- Born: 14 October 1992 (age 33) British Hong Kong
- Citizenship: Hong Kong
- Party: Tin Shui Wai Connection

Lam Chun (Chinese: 林進; born 14 October 1992) is a Hong Kong social activist and former member of the Yuen Long District Council for Shui Wah. He is currently convenor of the Tin Shui Wai Connection.

== Biography ==
Raised in Yuen Long, Lam formed Tin Shui Wai Connection with other Tin Shui Wai netizens in 2019 aiming at contesting in the 2019 District Council election against the pro-Beijing incumbents. Lam ran against pro-Beijing incumbent Chow Wing-kan in Shui Wah and received 3,955 votes, winning the seat by a margin of 1,691 votes. He is chair of the council's Finance and Administration Committee. On 8 July 2021, Lam announced his resignation from the District Council after the government introduced the new mandatory oaths of allegiance.

== Politics ==
Lam stands as an independent democrat. He opposes legislation to enact Article 23 of the Hong Kong Basic Law.

Political offices
Preceded by Chow Wing-kan	Member of Yuen Long District Council; Representative for Shui Wah; 2020–2021	Vacant
