= Population census in Hong Kong =

- Census and Statistics Department; HKSAR
- Formed: 1967
- Headquarters: 21/F, Wanchai Tower, 12 Harbour Road, Wan Chai, Hong Kong

In Hong Kong, censuses are conducted by the Census and Statistics Department (C&SD). Since 1961, a population census has been conducted in Hong Kong every 10 years and a by-census in the middle. The last census in 2021 was conducted from 23 June to 4 August 2021.

== Census and Statistics Ordinance ==
The Census and Statistics Ordinance, which was first effective in 1978, is the main law governing the work of the C&SD. Under Section 9 of the Census and Statistics Ordinance, the Chief Executive in Council (Cap 316) makes a Census Order for each round of population census / by-census.

Apart from the dates for conducting the population census, the Order specifies also the purpose of the census, the persons, premises and vessels in respect of which particulars are to be obtained, the persons who are required to give the requisite information, and the deadline for destroying the completed questionnaires. A schedule specifying the matters in respect of which respondents are required to give particulars is included in the Order.

According to the Census and Statistics (2021 Population Census) Order, the Commissioner will take a census of population from 23 June 2021 to 4 August 2021 (both dates inclusive) and the Commissioner must destroy all completed schedules collected or received by census officers for the 2021 census, and all copies of the schedules, on or before 22 June 2022.

== Data collection methods ==
Two full censuses were held in Hong Kong in 1961 and 1971, and two sample censuses in 1966 and 1976.

In population censuses conducted since 1981, a simple enumeration on all households in Hong Kong has been carried out to provide basic information (e.g. year and month of birth and sex) and a detailed enquiry on a certain proportion of households to provide a broad range of demographic and socio-economic characteristics of the population. Therefore, two types of questionnaire, namely the "Short Form" and the "Long Form", are used. In the 2001 population census, one-seventh of the households completed the "Long Form". Since the 2011 population census, around one-tenth of the households completed the "Long Form".

The design of population by-censuses is similar to that of population censuses, but a by-census differs from a census in not having a complete headcount of the population. Instead, the detailed characteristics of the population are collected on the basis of a large sample. The size and characteristics of the entire population are inferred from the sample results in accordance with appropriate statistical theory. In other words, all households sampled for the by-census are required to provide detailed information about their demographic and socio-economic characteristics by completing the "Long Form". A sample of about one-tenth of the residential addresses in Hong Kong was randomly selected for enumeration in the 2016 Population By-census, covering some 300 000 quarters. Among the enumerated households, 82 500 (or 40.5%) chose to provide information online.

A multi-modal data collection approach will be used in the 2021 population census.

In the first phase, all households may provide the required information through the following means:

- online questionnaire;
- postal questionnaire with pre-paid return envelope ("Short Form" only); and
- telephone interview via the hotline 18 2021.

In the second phase of data collection, C&SD will arrange census officers to visit households that have not yet provided their information, and use mobile tablets to collect the required information.

Besides, for households residing on fishing boats, their number will be estimated based on aerial photos of all anchorages in Hong Kong Waters and their characteristics estimated based on information provided by the Agriculture, Fisheries and Conservation Department. As for households residing on pleasure craft, notification letters will be sent to the sampled households to invite them to complete and submit online questionnaire.

Special arrangements will be made to enumerate some special groups of persons (called the special classes) who stay in places with restriction or difficulty of access.

In light of the evolving situation of COVID-19, C&SD will adopt contingency measures to reduce social contact.

== Confidentiality ==
C&SD will not release respondents' personal data to any unauthorised persons, including other Government departments. Under the Census and Statistics Ordinance, it is an offence to disclose the particulars of individual persons or households to unauthorised persons. All Temporary Field Workers will take an oath of secrecy, and will be stressed the importance of protecting data confidentiality and the legal consequence of improper handling of the data in their training. All collected data, including those provided by households through the Internet and collected by census officers using mobile tablets, will be encrypted during transmission, and will only be stored and processed in designated area of C&SD. The transient data in mobile tablets will also be encrypted and then deleted once uploaded. Besides, all completed questionnaires, in both paper and electronic forms, will be destroyed within 12 months after the completion of the survey.

== Data topics ==
Data Topics	2001 census	2006 by-census	2011 census	2016 By-census	2021 census
Demographic and social characteristics
1. Year and month of birth	✔	✔	✔	✔	✔
2. Sex	✔	✔	✔	✔	✔
3. Marital Status	✔	✔	✔	✔	✔
4. Usual spoken language	✔	✔	✔	✔	✔
5. Ability to speak other languages / dialects	✔	✔	✔	✔	✔
6. Ability to read/write languages				✔	✔
7. Nationality	✔	✔	✔	✔	✔
8. Ethnicity	✔	✔	✔	✔	✔
9. Place of birth	✔	✔	✔	✔	✔
10. Elderly persons requiring care					✔
Educational characteristics
11. School attendance	✔	✔	✔	✔	✔
12. Educational attainment (highest level attended)	✔	✔	✔	✔	✔
13. Educational attainment (highest level completed)	✔	✔	✔	✔	✔
14. Field of education	✔	✔	✔	✔	✔
15. Place of study	✔	✔	✔	✔	✔
16. Mode of transport to place of study	✔	✔	✔	✔	✔
Internal migration characteristics
17. Whereabouts at census / by-census reference moment	✔	✔	✔	✔	✔
18. Duration of residence in Hong Kong	✔	✔	✔	✔	✔
19. Place of residence 5 years ago	✔	✔	✔	✔	✔
Economic characteristics
20. Economic activity status	✔	✔	✔	✔	✔
21. Industry	✔	✔	✔	✔	✔
22. Occupation	✔	✔	✔	✔	✔
23. Whether having secondary employment	✔	✔	✔	✔	✔
24. Earnings from main employment	✔	✔	✔	✔	✔
25. Earnings from other employment	✔	✔	✔	✔	✔
26. Other cash income	✔	✔	✔	✔	✔
27. Hours of work				✔	✔
28. Place of work	✔	✔	✔	✔	✔
29. Mode of transport to place of work	✔	✔	✔	✔	✔
Housing characteristics
30. Type of quarters	✔	✔	✔	✔	✔
31. Type of accommodation	✔	✔	✔	✔	✔
32. Whether the quarters is used as usual or occasional residence	✔	✔	✔	✔	✔
33. Whether the quarters is a subdivided unit				✔	✔
34. Number of rooms in the residence	✔	✔	✔	✔	✔
35. Floor area of accommodation				✔	✔
36. No. of households in quarters	✔	✔	✔	✔	✔
37. No. of occupants in quarters	✔	✔	✔	✔	✔
38. Tenure of accommodation	✔	✔	✔	✔	✔
39. Rent	✔	✔	✔	✔	✔
40. Mortgage payment or loan payment	✔	✔	✔	✔	✔
Household characteristics
41. Type of household	✔	✔	✔	✔	✔
42. Relationship to head of household	✔	✔	✔	✔	✔
43. Whether a member of household	✔	✔	✔	✔	✔
44. Household size	✔	✔	✔	✔	✔
45. Household composition	✔	✔	✔	✔	✔
46. Household income	✔	✔	✔	✔	✔
Total Number of Data Topics	41	41	41	45	46

== Summary statistics ==
Data items	2001 census	2006 by-census	2011 census	2016 by-census
Census / By-census Reference Moment	3:00am on 14 March 2001	3:00am on 14 July 2006	3:00am on 30 June 2011	3am on 30 June 2016
Total population	6 708 389	6 864 346	7 071 576	7 336 585
Males	3 285 344	3 272 956	3 303 015	3 375 362
Females	3 423 045	3 591 390	3 768 561	3 961 223
Median age (years)	36.7	39.6	41.7	43.4
Population aged 15+	5 598 972	5 924 671	6 248 016	6 506 130
Youths aged 15–24 (excluding foreign domestic helpers)	887 432	880 175	860 002	776 709
Older persons aged 65+	747 052	852 796	941 312	1 163 153
Labour force	3 437 992	3 572 384	3 727 407	3 954 798
Labour force participation rate	61.4%	60.3%	59.7%	60.8%
Working population	3 252 706	3 365 736	3 547 781	3 756 612
Median income from main employment (HK$)	10,000	10,000	11,000	15,000
Ethnic minorities	343 950	342 198	451 183	584 383
Single parents	61 431	76 423	81 705	73 428
Persons from the Mainland having resided in HK for less than 7 Years	266 577	217 103	171 322	165 956
Occupied quarters	2 015 235	2 226 074	2 381 125	2 526 026
Domestic households	2 053 412	2 226 546	2 368 796	2 509 734
Average domestic household size	3.1	3.0	2.9	2.8
Median monthly domestic household income (HK$)	18,710	17,250	20,500	25,000

== History ==
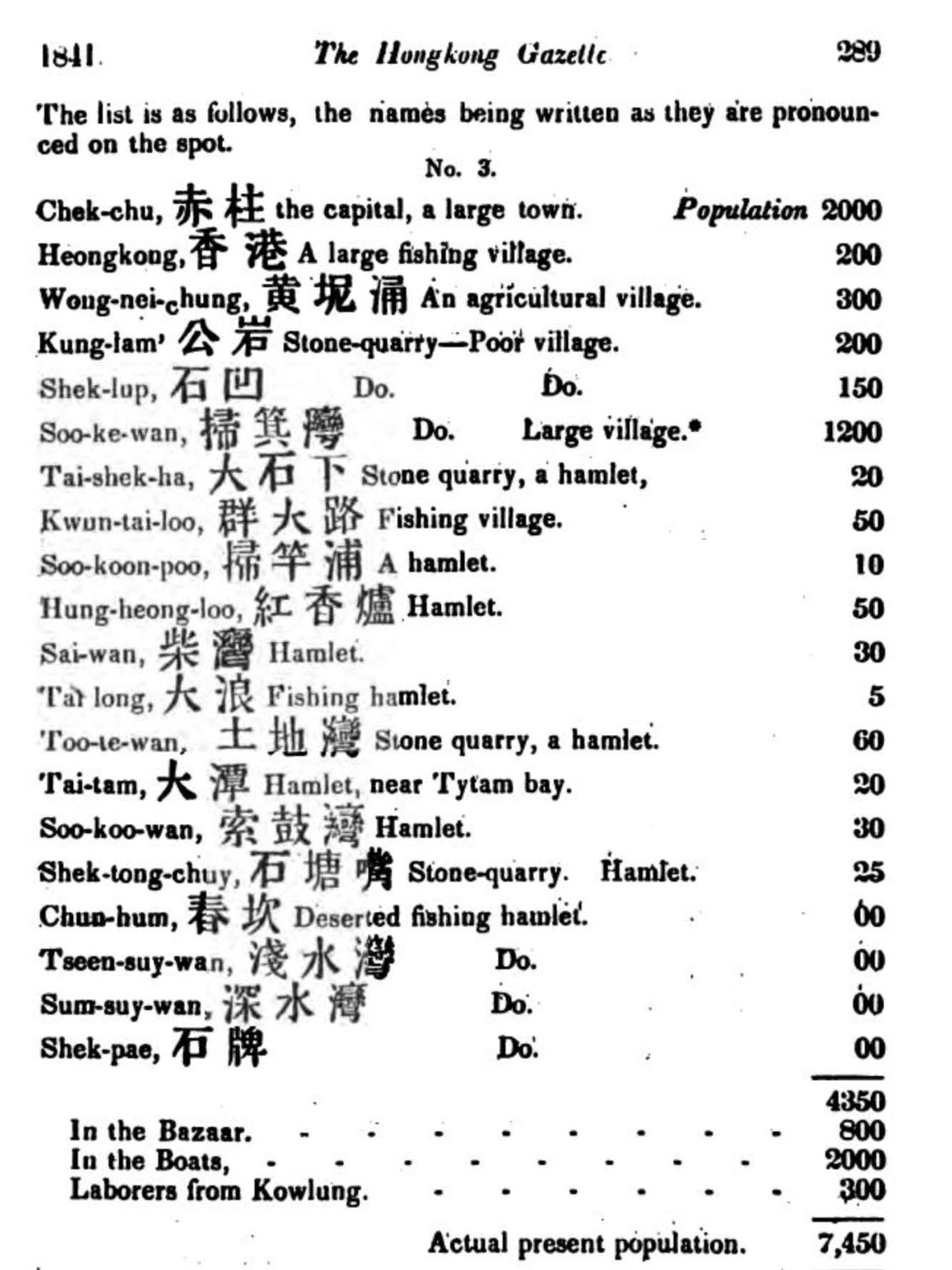
Hong Kong Island Population in "Chinese Repository", 1841

The first population census in Hong Kong could be traced back to 1841 when a full enumeration of persons in the villages on Hong Kong Island was conducted.

Since 1961, a population census has been conducted in Hong Kong every 10 years and a by-census in the middle of the intercensal period.

Population censuses were conducted in 1961, 1971, 1981, 1991, 2001, 2011 and 2021 while population by-censuses in 1966, 1976, 1986, 1996, 2006 and 2016. The most recent population census was conducted from 23 June 2021 to 4 August 2021, while the most recent population by-census was conducted from 30 June 2016 to 2 August 2016.

== See also ==
- Census and Statistics Department (Hong Kong)
- 2021 population census in Hong Kong
