= San Wai =

San Wai (Chinese: 新圍) is the name of several places in Hong Kong:

- San Wai (North District) a.k.a. Kun Lung Wai (覲龍圍), a walled village in Lung Yeuk Tau, Fanling, North District
- San Wai (Ha Tsuen), in Ha Tsuen, Yuen Long District
- San Wai (San Tin) or San Wai Tsuen, in San Tin, Yuen Long District

And also

- Kei Ling Ha San Wai, in Kei Ling Ha, Sai Kung North
- Pui O San Wai, in Pui O, Lantau Island

== See also ==
- San Wai Tsai (disambiguation), the name of two villages in Hong Kong
- San Wai Court, a public housing estate in Tuen Mun
- San Wai stop, a Light Rail stop in Tuen Mun
