= Tin King =

Tin King may refer to:

== Places ==
- Tin King Estate, a public housing estate in Tuen Mun, Hong Kong
- Tin King stop, an MTR Light Rail stop adjacent to the estate

== People ==
- Dexter Young (Yeung Tin-king), Hong Kong actor
- William B. Leeds, American businessman

== Others ==
- Tin King (constituency), a constituency in Tuen Mun District
