= Leung Tin Tsuen =

Village in Hong Kong

Coordinates: 22.399204°N 113.978254°E

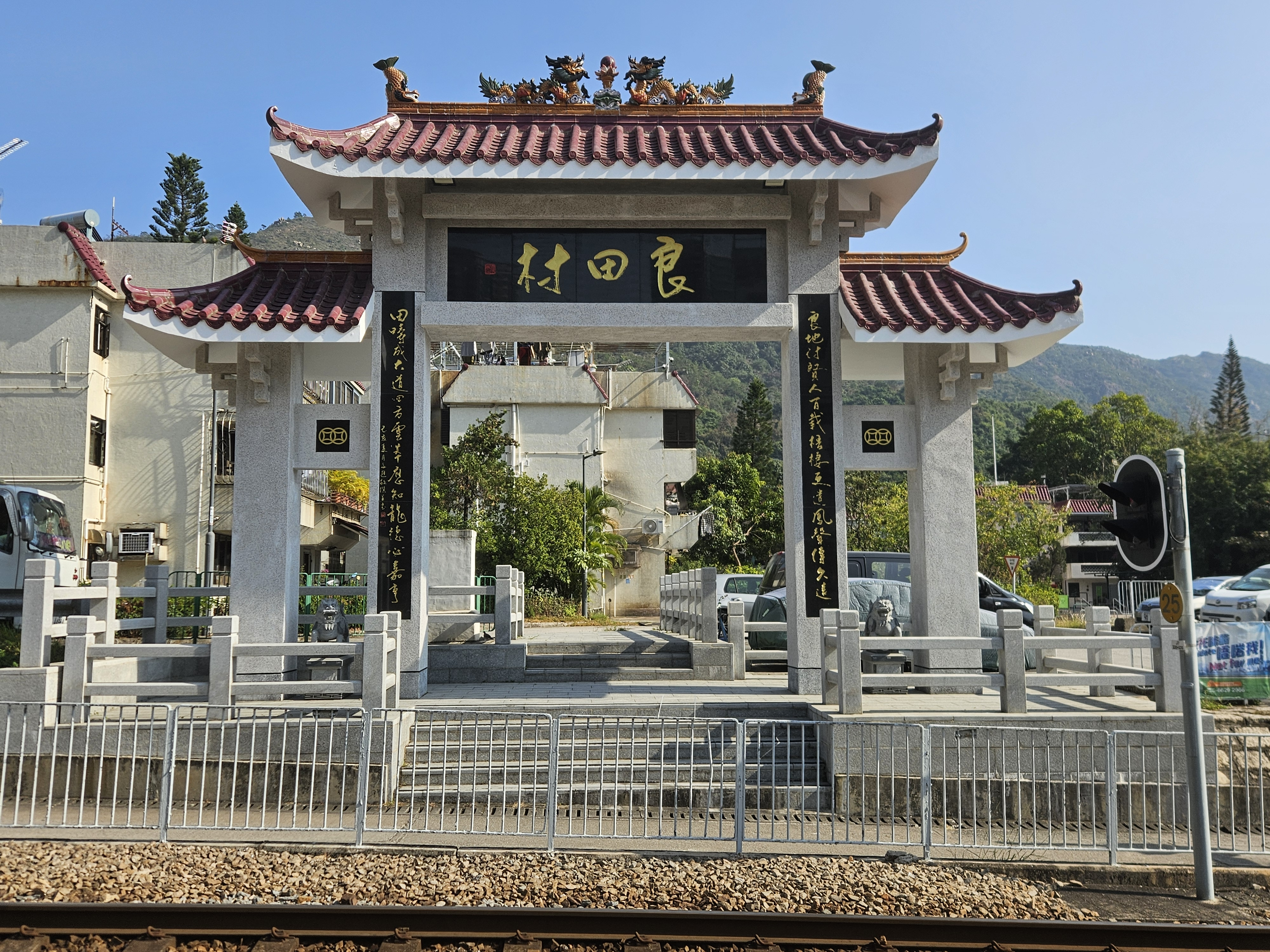
Paifang of Leung Tin Tsuen.

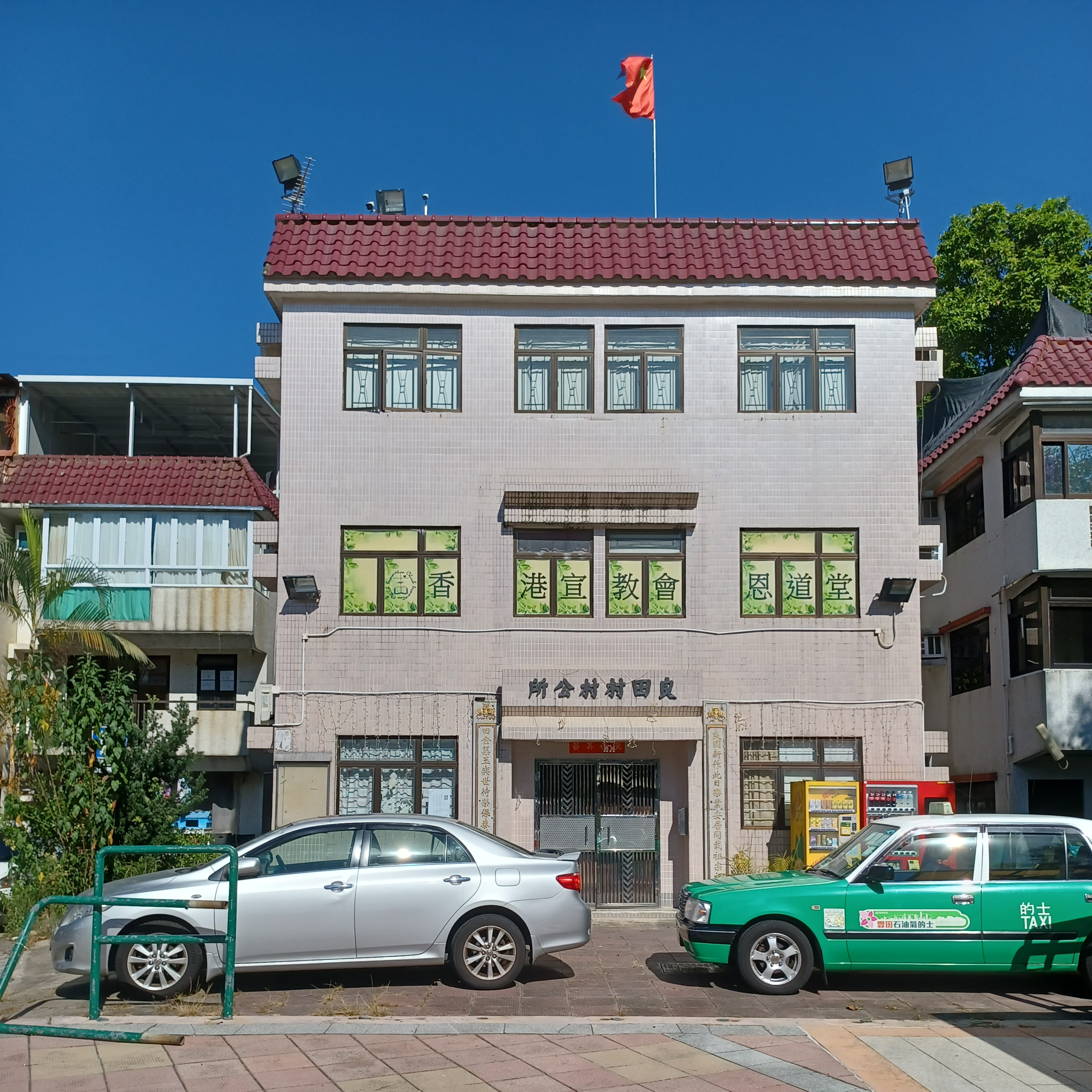
Leung Tin Tsuen Village office.

Leung Tin Tsuen (Chinese: 良田村) is a village in Tuen Mun District, Hong Kong.

== Administration ==
Leung Tin Tsuen is one of the 36 villages represented within the Tuen Mun Rural Committee. For electoral purposes, Leung Tin Tsuen is part of the San Hui constituency, which was formerly represented by Cheung Ho-sum until May 2021.

== See also ==
- Leung King Estate
- San Wai Court
- Tin King Estate
