= San King (constituency) =

Hong Kong constituency

- 新景
- Elected constituency for the Tuen Mun District Council
- Boundary of San King in Tuen Mun District
- District: Tuen Mun
- Legislative Council constituency: New Territories North West
- Population: 13,772 (2019)
- Electorate: 9,910 (2019)

Current constituency
- Created: 1994
- Number of members: One
- Member: Vacant

San King (Chinese: 新景) is one of the 31 constituencies in the Tuen Mun District.

Created for the 1994 District Board elections, the constituency returns one district councillor to the Tuen Mun District Council, with an election every four years.

San King loosely covers areas surrounding San Wai Court and Por Lo Shan in Tuen Mun with an estimated population of 13,772.

== Councillors represented ==
| Election | Member | Party |
|---|---|---|
| 1994 | Catherine Wong Lai-sheung→Vacant | Democratic |

== Election results ==
=== 2010s ===
Tuen Mun District Council Election, 2019: San King
| Party | Candidate | Votes | % | ±% |
|---|---|---|---|---|
| Democratic | Catherine Wong Lai-sheung | 4,698 | 69.72 | +1.36 |
| DAB | Chan Tsim-heng | 2,040 | 30.28 | −1.36 |
| Majority | | 2,658 | 39.44 | |
| Turnout | | 6,768 | 68.34 | |
| Democratic hold | | Swing | | |

Tuen Mun District Council Election, 2015: San King
| Party | Candidate | Votes | % | ±% |
|---|---|---|---|---|
| Democratic | Catherine Wong Lai-sheung | 2,686 | 68.36 | −1.75 |
| DAB | Lee Fung-sim | 1,243 | 31.64 | +1.75 |
| Majority | | 1,443 | 36.72 | |
| Turnout | | 3,929 | 41.93 | |
| Democratic hold | | Swing | −1.75 | |

Tuen Mun District Council Election, 2011: San King
| Party | Candidate | Votes | % | ±% |
|---|---|---|---|---|
| Democratic | Catherine Wong Lai-sheung | 2,533 | 70.01 | +4.76 |
| DAB | Lee Fung-sim | 1,085 | 29.99 | −4.76 |
| Majority | | 1,448 | 40.02 | |
| Turnout | | 3,816 | 35.96 | |
| Democratic hold | | Swing | +4.76 | |

=== 2000s ===
Tuen Mun District Council Election, 2007: San King
| Party | Candidate | Votes | % | ±% |
|---|---|---|---|---|
| Democratic | Catherine Wong Lai-sheung | 2,185 | 65.24 | −11.53 |
| DAB | Sze Cheng-chong | 1,164 | 34.76 | +11.53 |
| Majority | | 1,021 | 30.38 | |
| Democratic hold | | Swing | −11.53 | |

Tuen Mun District Council Election, 2003: San King
| Party | Candidate | Votes | % | ±% |
|---|---|---|---|---|
| Democratic | Catherine Wong Lai-sheung | 2,621 | 76.77 | +1.33 |
| DAB | Wong Man-ho | 793 | 23.23 | −1.33 |
| Majority | | 1,828 | 53.54 | |
| Democratic hold | | Swing | +1.33 | |

=== 1990s ===
Tuen Mun District Council Election, 1999: San King
| Party | Candidate | Votes | % | ±% |
|---|---|---|---|---|
| Democratic | Catherine Wong Lai-sheung | 2,930 | 75.44 | +11.84 |
| DAB | Lam Kwan-yui | 954 | 24.56 | |
| Majority | | 1,976 | 50.88 | |
| Democratic hold | | Swing | | |

Tuen Mun District Board Election, 1994: San King
| Party | Candidate | Votes | % | ±% |
|---|---|---|---|---|
| Democratic | Catherine Wong Lai-sheung | 1,915 | 53.60 | |
| Independent | Lau Ka-wai | 1,658 | 46.40 | |
| Majority | | 257 | 7.20 | |
| Democratic win (new seat) | | | | |
