= San Wai Tsai =

San Wai Tsai (Chinese: 新圍仔) is the name of two villages in Hong Kong:

- San Wai Tsai (Tai Po District) in Tai Po District
- San Wai Tsai (Tuen Mun) in Tuen Mun
