= San Wai Tsai (Tuen Mun) =

Coordinates: 22.398432°N 113.97835°E

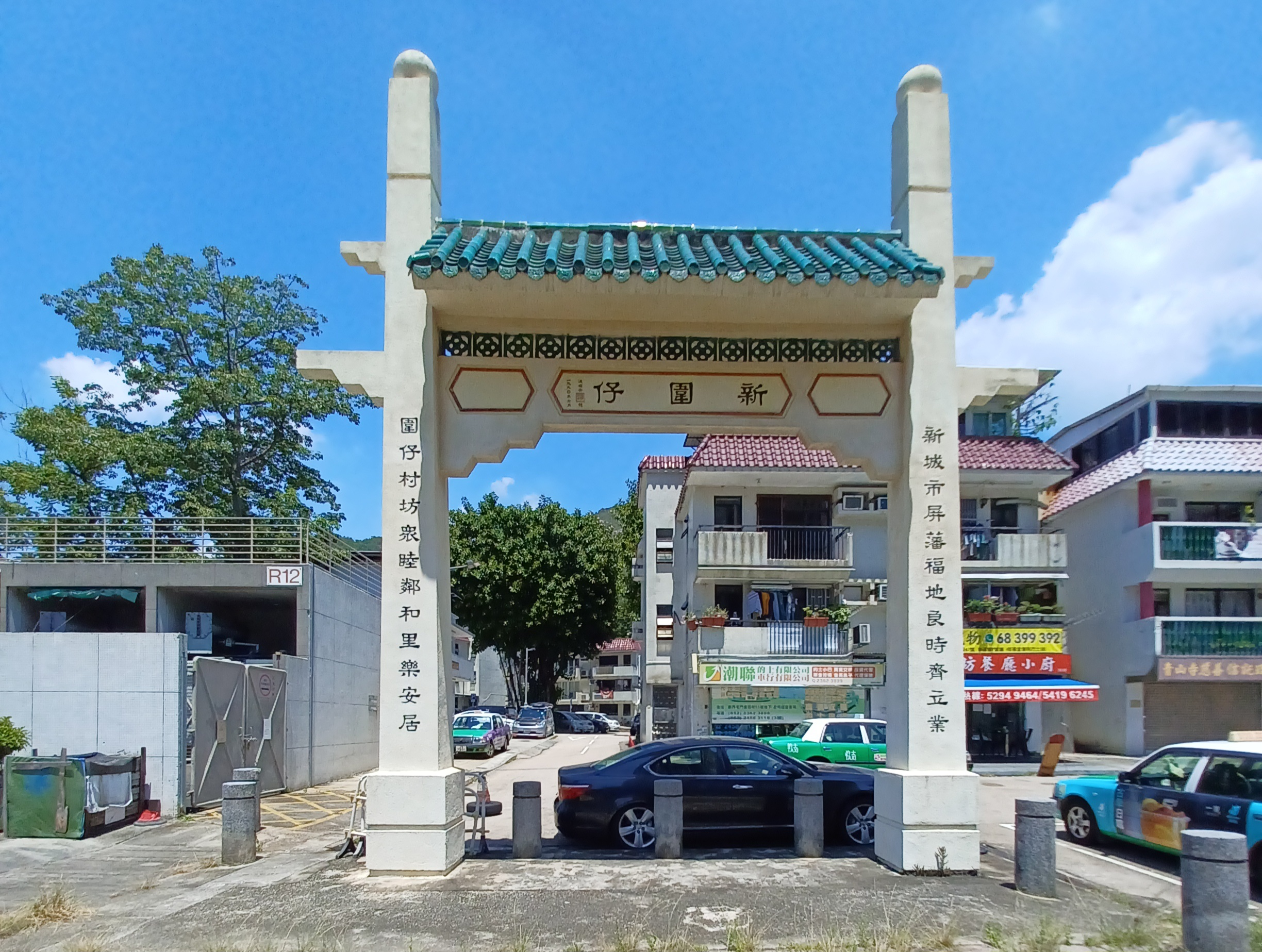
Paifang of San Wai Tsai.

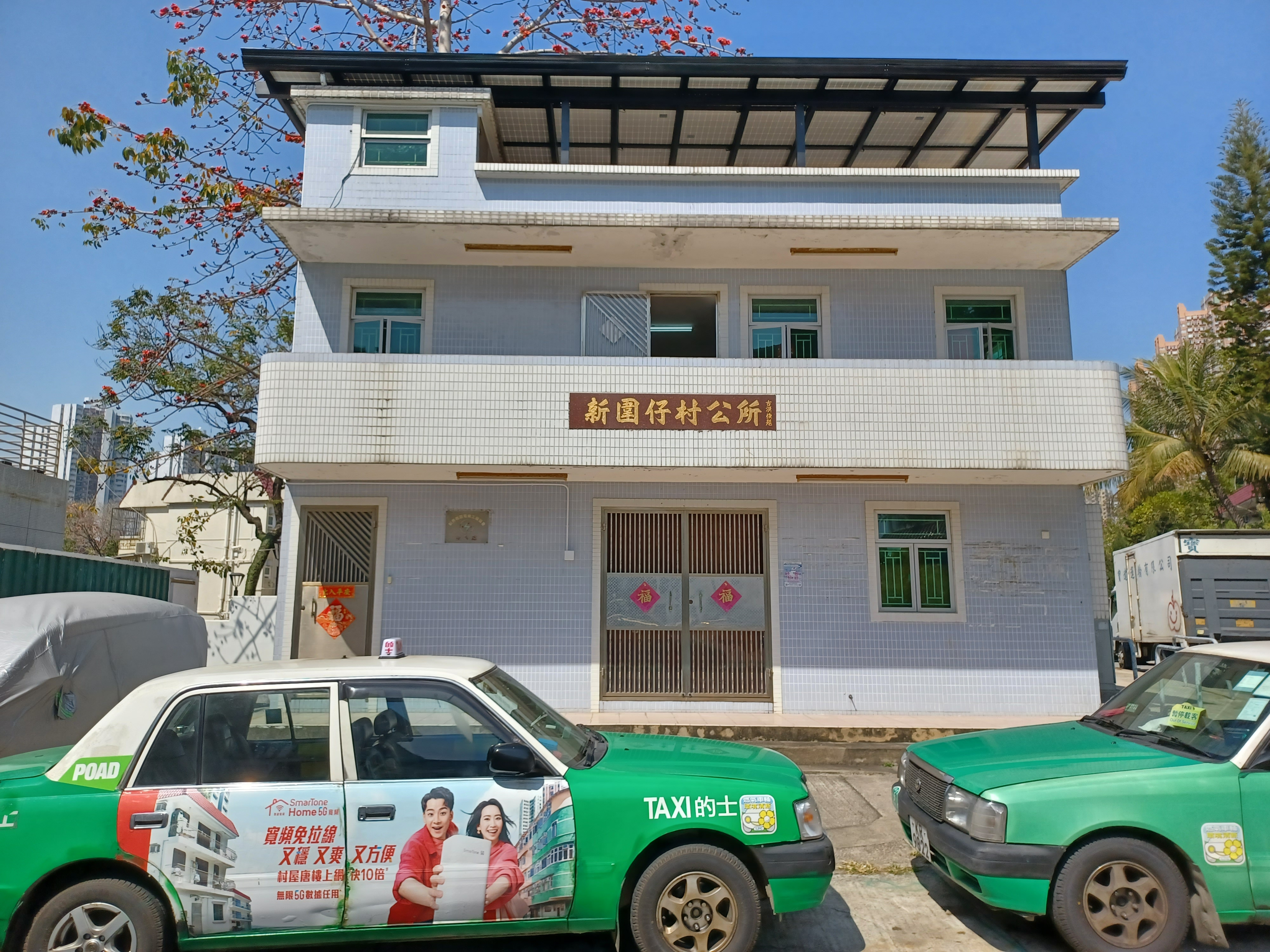
San Wai Tsai village office.

San Wai Tsai (Chinese: 新圍仔) is a village in Tuen Mun District, Hong Kong.

== Administration ==
San Wai Tsai is one of the 36 villages represented within the Tuen Mun Rural Committee. For electoral purposes, San Wai Tsai is part of the San Hui constituency, which was formerly represented by Cheung Ho-sum until May 2021.

== See also ==
- San Wai Court
