= Leung King =

Leung King may refer to:

- Leung King Estate, a public housing estate in Tuen Mun, Hong Kong
- Leung King stop, an MTR Light Rail stop adjacent to the estate
