= Tin King Estate =

Public housing estate in Tuen Mun, Hong Kong

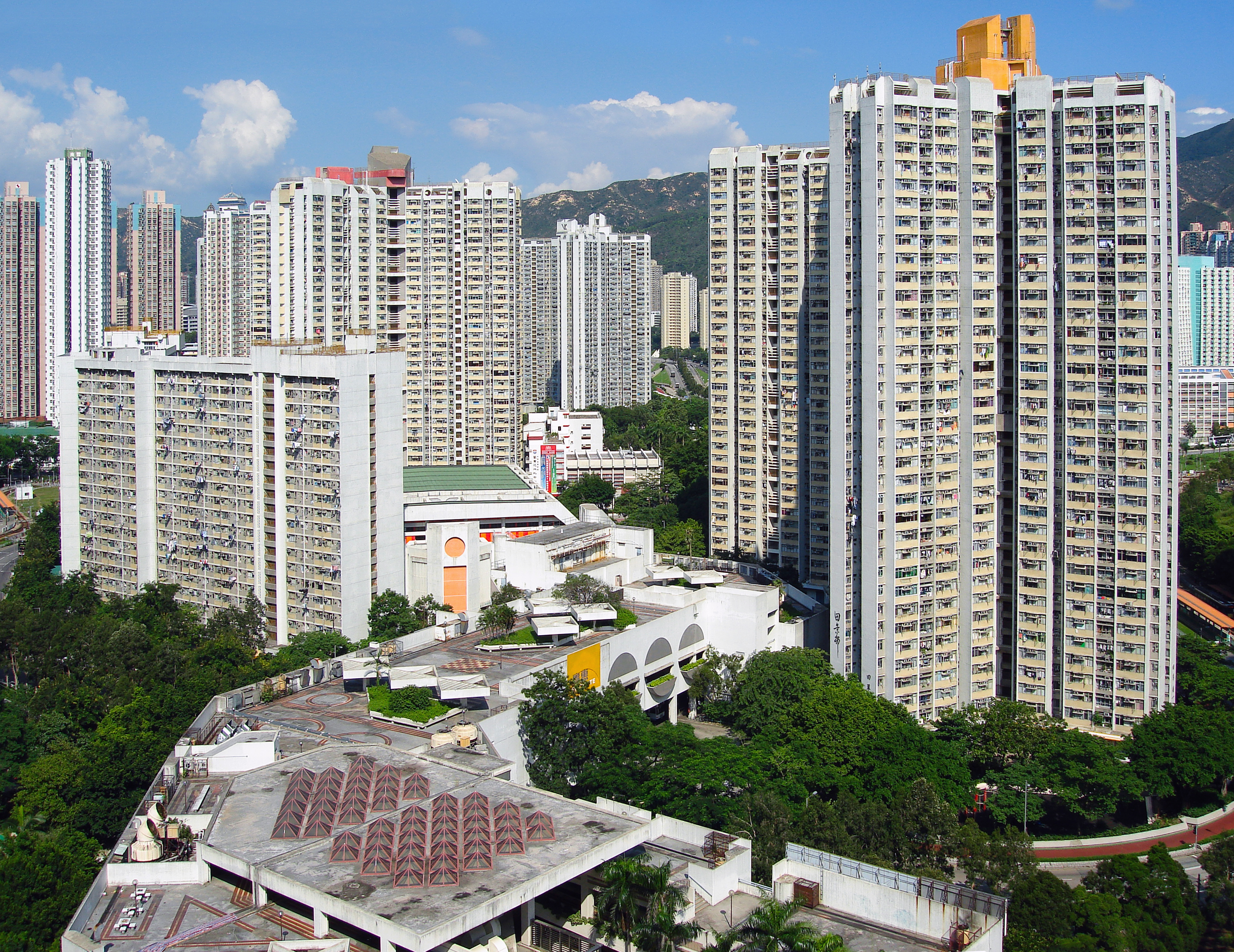
- Tin King Estate
- Interactive map of Tin King Estate

General information
- Location: 10 Tin King Road, Tuen Mun; New Territories, Hong Kong
- Coordinates: 22.406458°N 113.965680°E
- Status: Completed
- Category: Tenants Purchase Scheme (TPS)
- Population: 9,610 (2016)
- No. of blocks: 4
- No. of units: 3,206

Construction
- Constructed: 1989; 37 years ago
- Authority: Hong Kong Housing Authority

Tin King Estate (Chinese: 田景邨) is a public housing estate in Tuen Mun, New Territories, Hong Kong. It is the tenth public housing estate in Tuen Mun, located near Light Rail Tin King stop, Leung King stop and San Wai stop. It consists of four residential buildings completed in 1989. The estate was formerly the site of Leung Tin Village and it was named from the village, together with the nearby Leung King Estate. Some of the flats were sold under Tenants Purchase Scheme Phase 2 in 1999.

Siu Kwai Court (Chinese: 兆畦苑) and Siu Pong Court (Chinese: 兆邦苑) are Home Ownership Scheme courts in Tuen Mun near Tin King Estate, built in 1990 and 1991 respectively.

== Houses ==
=== Tin King Estate ===
Name	Chinese name	Building type	Completed
Tin Lok House	田樂樓	New Slab	1989
Tin Tun House	田敦樓	Trident 3	1989
Tin Yue House	田裕樓	Trident 3	1989
Tin Tsui House	田翠樓	Trident 4	1989

=== Siu Kwai Court ===
Name	Chinese name	Building type	Completed
Siu Keung House	兆強閣	Trident 3	1990
Siu Fu House	兆富閣	Trident 4	1990

=== Siu Pong Court ===
Name	Chinese name	Building type	Completed
Siu Pong Court	兆邦苑	Trident 4	1991

== Demographics ==
According to the 2016 by-census, Tin King Estate had a population of 9,610 while Siu Kwai Court had a population of 3,784. Altogether the population amounts to 13,394.

== Politics ==
Tin King Estate, Siu Kwai Court and Siu Pong Court are located in Tin King constituency of the Tuen Mun District Council. It is currently represented by Leung Ho-man, who was elected in the 2019 elections.

== Education ==
Tin King Estate is in Primary One Admission (POA) School Net 70. Within the school net are multiple aided schools (operated independently but funded with government money) and the following government schools: Tuen Mun Government Primary School (屯門官立小學).

== See also ==
- Public housing estates in Tuen Mun
