= 2007 Tuen Mun District Council election =

Hong Kong local election

- 18 November 2007

29 (of the 37) seats to Tuen Mun District Council 19 seats needed for a majority
- Turnout: 36.1%
	First party	Second party
Party	DAB	Democratic
Last election	9 seats, 31.9%	9 seats, 27.3%
Seats before	9	9
Seats won	11	7
Seat change	▲2	▼2
Popular vote	28,756	19,461
Percentage	35.2%	23.8%
Swing	▲3.3%	▼3.5%
	Third party	Fourth party
Party	ADPL	Liberal
Last election	4 seats, 18.2%	Did not contest
Seats before	4	1
Seats won	2	1
Seat change	▼2	Steady
Popular vote	4,247	1,958
Percentage	10.8%	2.4%
Swing	▼7.4%	N/A
- Colours on map indicate winning party for each constituency.

The 2007 Tuen Mun District Council election was held on 18 November 2007 to elect all 29 elected members to the 37-member District Council.

== Overall election results ==
Before election:

↓
13	16
Pro-democracy	Pro-Beijing

Change in composition:

↓
9	20
Pro-democracy	Pro-Beijing

Tuen Mun District Council election result 2007
Party	Seats	Gains	Losses	Net gain/loss	Seats %	Votes %	Votes	+/−
DAB	11	2	0	+2	37.9	35.2	28,756	+3.3
Democratic	7	0	2	−2	24.1	23.8	19,461	−3.5
Independent	8	2	0	+2	27.6	21.6	17,633	
Civic	0	0	0	0	0	10.8	4,259	
ADPL	2	0	2	−2	6.9	10.8	4,247	−7.4
Liberal	1	0	0	0	3.4	2.4	1,958	
