= 1999 Tuen Mun District Council election =

Hong Kong local election

- 28 November 1998

29 (of the 37) seats to Tuen Mun District Council 19 seats needed for a majority
- Turnout: 35.3%
	First party	Second party	Third party
Party	Democratic	DAB	ADPL
Last election	9 seats, 32.4%	2 seats, 7.2%	4 seats, 18.9%
Seats before	8	6	4
Seats won	9	7	4
Seat change	▲1	▲1	Steady
Popular vote	17,458	18,524	9,159
Percentage	29.2%	31.0%	15.3%
Swing	▼3.2%	▲20.8%	▼3.6%
	Fourth party	Fifth party
Party	123DA	HKPA
Last election	2 seats, 9.9%	Did not contest
Seats before	2	1
Seats won	2	1
Seat change	Steady	Steady
Popular vote	4,747	Uncontested
Percentage	8.0%	N/A
Swing	▼1.9%	N/A
- Colours on map indicate winning party for each constituency.

The 1999 Tuen Mun District Council election was held on 28 November 1999 to elect all 29 elected members to the 37-member District Council.

== Overall election results ==
Before election:

↓
13	12
Pro-democracy	Pro-Beijing

Change in composition:

↓
15	14
Pro-democracy	Pro-Beijing

Tuen Mun District Council election result 1999
Party	Seats	Gains	Losses	Net gain/loss	Seats %	Votes %	Votes	+/−
DAB	7	1	0	+1	24.1	31.0	18,524	+20.8
Democratic	9	2	1	+1	31.0	29.2	17,458	−3.2
Independent	6	1	0	+1	20.7	20.0	15,476	
ADPL	4	1	1	0	13.8	15.3	9,159	−3.6
123DA	2	1	0	+1	6.9	8.0	4,747	−1.9
HKPA	1	0	0	0	3.4	0	0	
