= Ying Pun Ha Chuk Hang =

Village in Hong Kong

Coordinates: 22.458245°N 114.162447°E

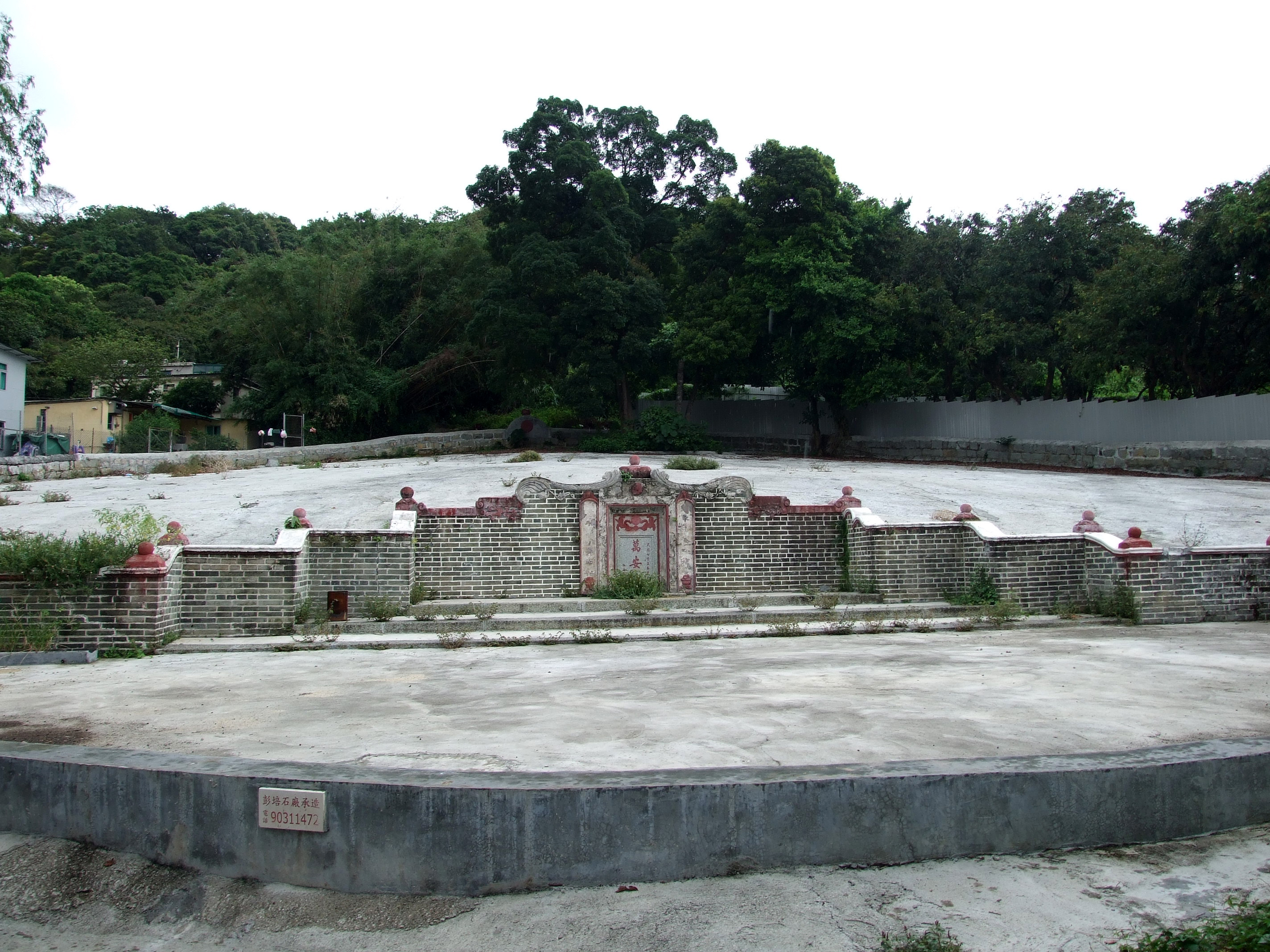
Man On Grave (萬安墳) in Ying Pun Ha.

Ying Pun Ha Chuk Hang (Chinese: 營盤下竹坑) is a village in Tai Po District, Hong Kong.

It comprises two distinct settlements: Ying Pun Ha (營盤下; 'the village below the military camp') and Chuk Hang (竹坑).

== History ==
At the time of the 1911 census, the population of Chuk Hang San Wai was 18. The number of males was 7.

== See also ==
- San Wai Tsai (Tai Po District), a nearby village
