= 2011 Tuen Mun District Council election =

Hong Kong local election

- 6 November 2011

29 (of the 35) seats to Tuen Mun District Council 18 seats needed for a majority
- Turnout: 38.6%
	First party	Second party	Third party
Party	DAB	Democratic	ADPL
Last election	11 seats, 35.2%	7 seats, 23.8%	2 seats, 10.8%
Seats before	12	7	2
Seats won	12	7	2
Seat change	Steady	Steady	Steady
Popular vote	30,893	26,621	4,247
Percentage	34.6%	29.8%	4.8%
Swing	▼0.6%	▲6.0%	▼6.0%
- Colours on map indicate winning party for each constituency.

The 2011 Tuen Mun District Council election was held on 6 November 2011 to elect all 29 elected members to the 35-member District Council.

== Overall election results ==
Before election:

↓
9	20
Pro-democracy	Pro-Beijing

Change in composition:

↓
9	20
Pro-democracy	Pro-Beijing

Tuen Mun District Council election result 2011
Party	Seats	Gains	Losses	Net gain/loss	Seats %	Votes %	Votes	+/−
DAB	12	1	1	0	41.4	34.6	30,893	-0.6
Democratic	7	1	1	0	24.1	29.8	26,621	+6.0
Independent	7	1	1	0	41.2	27.9	14,179	
ADPL	2	0	0	0	6.9	4.8	4,247	−6.0
People Power	0	0	0	0	0	2.6	2,343	
PfD	0	0	0	0	0	1.7	1,506	
Civic	0	0	0	0	0	1.2	1,089	−4.0
Liberal	0	0	0	0	0	0.8	711	−1.6
NPP	0	0	0	0	0	0.5	458	
