= Tin King (constituency) =

Hong Kong constituency

- Elected constituency for the Tuen Mun District Council
- Boundary of Tin King in Tuen Mun District
- District: Tuen Mun
- Legislative Council constituency: New Territories North West
- Population: 15,565 (2019)
- Electorate: 11,541 (2019)

Current constituency
- Created: 1994
- Number of members: One
- Member: Leung Ho-man (Independent)

Tin King is one of the 37 constituencies in the Tuen Mun District. The constituency returns one district councillor to the Tuen Mun District Council, with an election every four years.

Tin King constituency is loosely based on the area of Tin King Estate in Tuen Mun with estimated population of 16,443.

== Councillors represented ==
Election	Member	Party
1991	Lee Man-kwong	United Democrats
1994	Lee Man-kwong	Democratic
1996 by-election	Lothar Lee Hung-sham	DAB
2012	Lothar Lee Hung-sham	FTU
2019	Leung Ho-man	Independent democrat

== Election results ==
=== 2010s ===
Tuen Mun District Council Election, 2019: Tin King
Party	Candidate	Votes	%	±%
Ind. democrat	Leung Ho-man	4,254	52.60	
FTU	Lothar Lee Hung-sham	3,038	37.57	−25.90
Civic Passion	Leung Yat-long	758	9.37	
Nonpartisan	Lui Mei-yuk	37	0.46	
Majority		1,216	15.03	
Ind. democrat gain from FTU		Swing		

Tuen Mun District Council Election, 2015: Tin King
Party	Candidate	Votes	%	±%
FTU	Lothar Lee Hung-sham	2,295	63.47	−4.27
Nonpartisan	Chiu Kim-ling	1,321	36.53	
Majority		974	26.94	
FTU hold		Swing		

Tuen Mun District Council Election, 2011: Tin King
Party	Candidate	Votes	%	±%
DAB	Lothar Lee Hung-sham	2,306	67.74	
PfD	Tsang Chun-hing	1,098	32.26	
Majority		1,208	35.48	
Turnout		3,404	31.04	
DAB hold		Swing		

=== 2000s ===
Tuen Mun District Council Election, 2007: Tin King
Party	Candidate	Votes	%	±%
DAB	Lothar Lee Hung-sham	2,416	72.42	+10.99
Civic	So Kwan-yiu	920	27.58	
Majority		1,496	44.84	
DAB hold		Swing		

Tuen Mun District Council Election, 2003: Tin King
Party	Candidate	Votes	%	±%
DAB	Lothar Lee Hung-sham	2,577	61.43	−15.01
Democratic	Tang Kam-ying	1,618	38.57	
Majority		959	22.86	
DAB hold		Swing		

=== 1990s ===
Tuen Mun District Council Election, 1999: Tin King
Party	Candidate	Votes	%	±%
DAB	Lothar Lee Hung-sham	2,635	76.44	+24.74
123DA	Fung Hung-yiu	812	23.56	+19.17
Majority		1,823	52.88	
DAB hold		Swing		

Tin King by-election 1996
Party	Candidate	Votes	%	±%
DAB	Lothar Lee Hung-sham	1,579	51.70	
Democratic	Ho Hang-mui	1,132	37.07	
ADPL	Lee Yiu-hung	209	6.84	
123DA	Tse Yee-fong	134	4.39	
Majority		447	14.63	
DAB gain from Democratic		Swing		

Tuen Mun District Board Election, 1994: Tin King
Party	Candidate	Votes	%	±%
Democratic	Lee Man-kwong	Uncontested		
Democratic hold		Swing		

Tuen Mun District Board Election, 1991: Tin King
Party	Candidate	Votes	%	±%
United Democrats	Lee Man-kwong	1,073	73.90	
Nonpartisan	Chan Sau-wan	379	26.10	
Majority		694	47.80	
United Democrats win (new seat)				
