= San Wai Court =

Public housing estate in Tuen Mun, Hong Kong

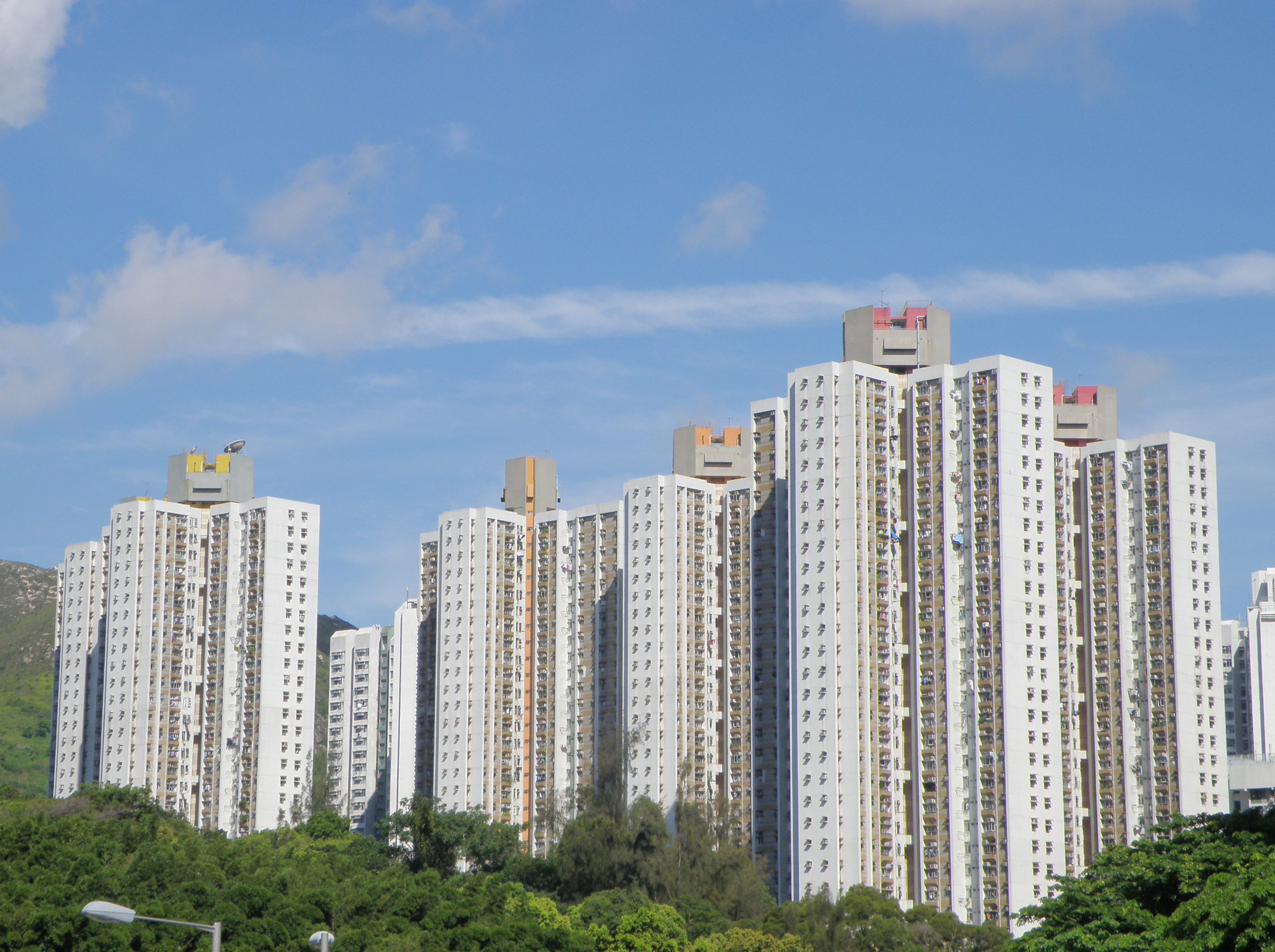
- San Wai Court
- Interactive map of San Wai Court

General information
- Location: 23 Tin King Road, Tuen Mun; New Territories, Hong Kong
- Coordinates: 22.4043921°N 113.962382°E
- Status: Completed
- Category: Home Ownership Scheme
- Population: 5,768 (2016)
- No. of blocks: 6
- No. of units: 2,100

Construction
- Constructed: 1989; 37 years ago
- Authority: Hong Kong Housing Authority

San Wai Court (Chinese: 新圍苑) is a Home Ownership Scheme court developed by the Hong Kong Housing Authority in Tuen Mun, New Territories, Hong Kong near Castle Peak and Tsing Shan Monastery. Formerly the old site of Leung Tin Village (良田村), the estate consists of six residential blocks completed in 1989. It is named from the nearby San Wai Tsai (新圍仔) and it is the only HOS court in Tuen Mun which is not named with the prefix "Siu" (兆). Light Rail San Wai stop is located at San Wai Court and it is named from the court.

== Houses ==
Name	Chinese name	Building type	Completed
San Yin House	新賢閣	NCB (Ver.1984)	1989
San Shun House	新順閣	NCB (Ver.1984)	1989
San Bik House	新碧閣	NCB (Ver.1984)	1989
San Hoi House	新凱閣	NCB (Ver.1984)	1989
San Woon House	新奐閣	NCB (Ver.1984)	1989
San Pui House	新珮閣	NCB (Ver.1984)	1989

== Demographics ==
According to the 2016 by-census, San Wai Court had a population of 5,768. The median age was 48.5 and the majority of residents (98.8 per cent) were of Chinese ethnicity. The average household size was 2.9 people. The median monthly household income of all households (i.e. including both economically active and inactive households) was HK$28,880.

== Politics ==
San Wai Court is located in San King constituency of the Tuen Mun District Council. It was formerly represented by Catherine Wong Lai-sheung, who was elected in the 2019 elections until July 2021.

== See also ==
- Public housing estates in Tuen Mun
