= 2015 Tuen Mun District Council election =

Hong Kong local election

- 22 November 2015

29 (of the 30) seats to Tuen Mun District Council 16 seats needed for a majority
- Turnout: 41.7%
	First party	Second party	Third party
Party	DAB	Democratic	FTU
Last election	12 seats, 34.6%	7 seats, 29.8%	Did not run
Seats before	8	7	4
Seats won	8	4	4
Seat change	Steady	▼3	Steady
Popular vote	24,077	18,343	10,007
Percentage	24.4%	18.6%	10.1%
Swing	▼10.2%	▼11.2%	N/A
	Fourth party	Fifth party	Sixth party
Party	NPP	ADPL	Labour
Last election	0 seat, 0.5%	2 seats, 4.8%	New party
Seats before	3	2	0
Seats won	4	3	1
Seat change	▲1	▲1	▲1
Popular vote	6,846	6,909	1,731
Percentage	6.9%	7.0%	1.8%
Swing	▲6.4%	▲2.2%	N/A
- Colours on map indicate winning party for each constituency.

The 2015 Tuen Mun District Council election was held on 22 November 2015 to elect all 29 elected members to the 30-member Tuen Mun District Council.

In Lok Tsui, veteran Albert Ho Chun-yan lost his seat to former Law Society of Hong Kong president Junius Ho Kwan-yiu, while radical democrat Civic Passion's Cheng Chung-tai took 391 votes, winning 1,617 votes, 125 fewer than Junius Ho.

== Overall election results ==
Before election:

↓
9	20
Pro-democracy	Pro-Beijing

Change in composition:

↓
8	21
Pro-democracy	Pro-Beijing

Tuen Mun District Council election result 2015
Party	Seats	Gains	Losses	Net gain/loss	Seats %	Votes %	Votes	+/−
DAB	8	2	2	0	27.6	24.4	24,077	–10.2
Independent	5	1	1	0	17.2	21.0	20,733	
Democratic	4	0	3	–3	13.8	18.6	18,343	–11.2
FTU	4	0	0	0	13.8	10.1	10,007	+3.1
ADPL	3	1	0	+1	10.3	7.0	6,909	+2.2
NPP	4	1	0	+1	13.8	6.9	6,846	
TMC	0	0	0	0	0	5.3	5,196	
Labour	1	1	0	+1	3.4	1.8	1,731	
People Power	0	0	0	0	0	1.1	1,057	–1.5
Civic Passion	0	0	0	0	0	0.4	391	
