= 2003 Tuen Mun District Council election =

Hong Kong local election

- 23 November 2003

29 (of the 37) seats to Tuen Mun District Council 19 seats needed for a majority
- Turnout: 42.9%
	First party	Second party
Party	DAB	Democratic
Last election	9 seats, 31.0%	9 seats, 29.2%
Seats before	7	9
Seats won	9	9
Seat change	▲2	Steady
Popular vote	24,657	21,074
Percentage	31.9%	27.3%
Swing	▲0.9%	▼1.9%
	Third party	Fourth party
Party	ADPL	HKPA
Last election	4 seats, 15.3%	1 seat
Seats before	4	1
Seats won	4	1
Seat change	Steady	Steady
Popular vote	14,061	202
Percentage	18.2%	0.3%
Swing	▲2.9%	N/A
- Colours on map indicate winning party for each constituency.

The 2003 Tuen Mun District Council election was held on 23 November 2003 to elect all 29 elected members to the 37-member District Council.

== Overall election results ==
Before election:

↓
15	14
Pro-democracy	Pro-Beijing

Change in composition:

↓
14	15
Pro-democracy	Pro-Beijing

Tuen Mun District Council election result 2003
Party	Seats	Gains	Losses	Net gain/loss	Seats %	Votes %	Votes	+/−
DAB	9	2	0	+2	31.0	31.9	24,657	+0.9
Democratic	9	1	1	0	31.0	27.3	21,074	−1.9
Independent	6	1	2	−1	20.7	20.0	15,476	
ADPL	4	0	0	0	13.8	18.2	14,061	+2.9
Democratic Alliance	0	0	1	−1	0	2.0	1,520	
CTU	0	0	0	0	0	0.3	228	
HKPA	1	0	0	0	3.4	0.3	202	
