= 2019 Tuen Mun District Council election =

Hong Kong local election

- 24 November 2019

31 (of the 32) seats to Tuen Mun District Council 17 seats needed for a majority
- Turnout: 70.9% ▲29.2%
	First party	Second party	Third party
Party	Democratic	ADPL	TMCN
Last election	4 seats, 18.6%	3 seats, 7.0%	New party
Seats before	4	3	0
Seats won	8	5	4
Seat change	▲4	▲2	▲4
Popular vote	35,184	20,560	20,086
Percentage	16.8%	9.8%	9.6%
Swing	▼1.8%	▲2.8%	N/A
	Fourth party	Fifth party	Sixth party
Party	Team Chu	Labour	DAB
Last election	New party	1 seat, 1.8%	8 seats, 24.4%
Seats before	0	1	8
Seats won	2	2	1
Seat change	▲2	▲1	▼7
Popular vote	10,499	8,028	36,865
Percentage	5.0%	3.8%	17.6%
Swing	N/A	▲2.0%	▼6.8%
	Seventh party	Eighth party	Ninth party
Party	FTU	Roundtable	Fu Sun Generation
Last election	4 seats, 10.1%	New party	New party
Seats before	4	2	0
Seats won	1	1	1
Seat change	▼3	▼1	▲1
Popular vote	12,782	6,667	5,486
Percentage	6.1%	3.2%	2.6%
Swing	▼2.4%	N/A	N/A
- Colours on map indicate winning party for each constituency.

The 2019 Tuen Mun District Council election was held on 24 November 2019 to elect all 31 elected members to the 32-member Tuen Mun District Council.

Amid the massive pro-democracy protests in 2019, Junius Ho who was a key anti-protest figure who was allegedly involved in the Yuen Long attack was challenged by Lo Chun-yu in his constituency in the November election. A historic landslide victory occurred as the pro-democrats took 28 of the 31 seats in the council with Ho being unseated. A local political group Tuen Mun Community Network also grabbed three seats as a result.

== Overall election results ==
Before election:

↓
8	22
Pro-democracy	Pro-Beijing

Change in composition:

↓
28	4
Pro-democracy	PB

Tuen Mun District Council election result 2019
Party	Seats	Gains	Losses	Net gain/loss	Seats %	Votes %	Votes	+/−
DAB	1	1	8	−7	3.2	17.6	36,865	–6.8
Democratic	8	4	0	+4	25.8	16.8	35,184	–1.8
Independent	3	3	5	−2	9.7	13.9	29,069	
TMCN	4	4	0	+4	6.5	9.6	20,086	
ADPL	5	2	0	+2	16.1	7.0	20,560	+2.8
FTU	1	0	3	−3	3.2	6.1	12,782	−4.0
Team Chu	2	2	0	+2	6.5	5.0	10,499	
NPP	0	0	2	−2	0.0	4.5	9,428	−2.4
Labour	2	1	0	+1	6.5	3.8	8,028	+2.0
Roundtable	1	0	1	−1	3.2	3.2	6,667	
Empowering HK	1	1	0	+1	3.2	2.7	5,590	
Fu Sun Generation	1	1	0	+1	3.2	2.6	5,486	
LMCG	1	1	0	+1	3.2	2.1	4,410	
Unity of San Hui	1	1	0	+1	3.2	1.6	3,276	
Civic Passion	0	0	0	0	0.0	0.5	1,061	+0.1
