= San Hui (constituency) =

Hong Kong constituency

- 新墟
- Elected constituency for the Tuen Mun District Council
- Boundary of San Hui in Tuen Mun District
- District: Tuen Mun
- Legislative Council constituency: New Territories North West
- Population: 20,036 (2019)
- Electorate: 8,057 (2019)

Current constituency
- Created: 1999
- Number of members: One
- Member: Vacant

San Hui (Chinese: 新墟) is one of the 31 constituencies in the Tuen Mun District.

Created for the 1999 District Council elections, the constituency returns one district councillor to the Tuen Mun District Council, with an election every four years.

San Hui loosely covers areas surrounding Tuen Mun San Hui in Tuen Mun with an estimated population of 20,036.

== Councillors represented ==
Election	Member	Party
1999	Kwu Hon-keung	Independent
2003	Kwu Hon-keung	Independent
2007	Kwu Hon-keung	Independent
2011	Kwu Hon-keung	Independent
2015	Kwu Hon-keung	Independent
2019	Cheung Ho-sum→Vacant (Note: Resigned on 10 May 2021 after being arrested under national security law.)	Unity of San Hui→TMCN

== Election results ==
=== 2010s ===
Tuen Mun District Council Election, 2019: San Hui
Party	Candidate	Votes	%	±%
Unity of San Hui	Cheung Ho-sum	3,276	60.49	
Nonpartisan	Kwu Hon-keung	2,140	39.51	
Majority		1,136	20.98	
Turnout		5,442	67.57	
Unity of San Hui gain from Nonpartisan		Swing		
