= Por Lo Shan =

Hill in Hong Kong

Por Lo Shan, Hong Kong
- 菠蘿山
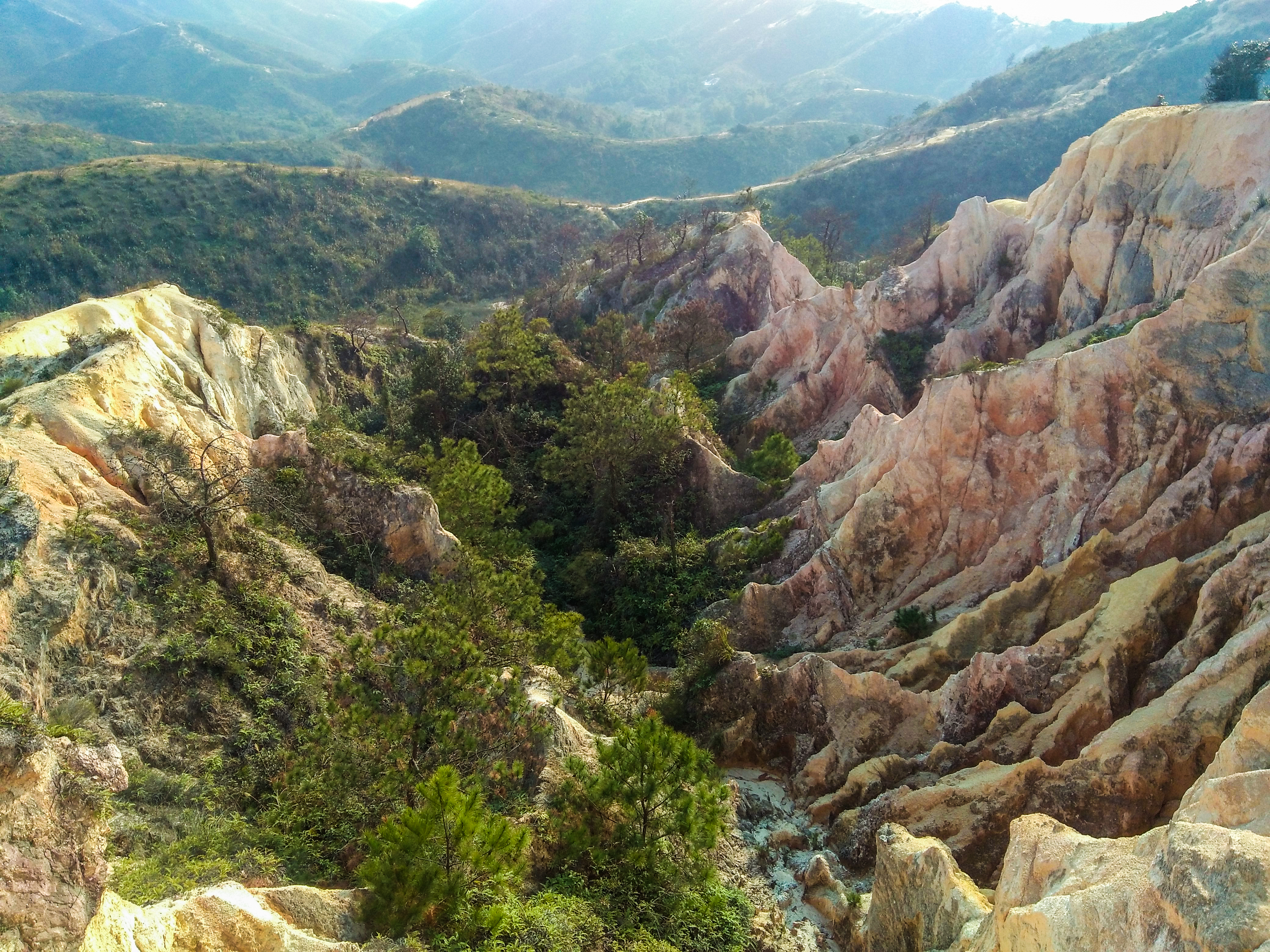
- View of the "Grand Canyon of Hong Kong" just to the west of Por Lo Shan

Highest point
- Elevation: 121 m (397 ft)
- Coordinates: 22°24′01″N 113°57′47″E

Geography
- Location within Hong Kong
- Location: Hong Kong

Por Lo Shan (Chinese: 菠蘿山; lit. 'Pineapple Mountain') is a 121 m (397 ft) high peak in the western New Territories of Hong Kong.

== Name confusion ==
Por Lo Shan is a small hill located between Leung King Estate and Shan King Estate. Nowadays, when hikers talk about "Por Lo Shan", they usually refer to the informally-named "Grand Canyon of Hong Kong", a few kilometres west of Por Lo Shan. The "Grand Canyon" is inside the Castle Peak Hinterland on Castle Peak Range Road, just west of Leung Tin Pass.

This confusion exists partly because the "Grand Canyon" is officially unnamed and also because the road leading to the "Grand Canyon" starts from the foot of Por Lo Shan, near Leung King Estate.

== Access restriction ==
While Por Lo Shan itself is not inside a restricted area, the "Grand Canyon of Hong Kong", to the west of Por Lo Shan, is inside a designated firing range used by the People's Liberation Army and police forces in Hong Kong, and is named the "Tsing Shan Firing Range".

The "Grand Canyon" is sometimes closed for military and police firing real-fire practices. Warnings are issued to the public before live military exercises are carried out. Sometimes the Fire Range is open to the public, but before venturing into the restricted area, it is best to confirm the days on which the area is open to the public by searching for "fire range" in the Hong Kong Government press release website. The press releases concerning the fire range for any given month is typically released one week prior to the start of that month. Generally speaking, Sundays and Public Holidays are open days.

Trespassing on restricted days can be a criminal offence.

== See also ==
- List of mountains, peaks and hills in Hong Kong
- Castle Peak
- Castle Peak Road
- Kau Keng Shan
