= San Wai Tsai (Tai Po District) =

Coordinates: 22.456543°N 114.163755°E

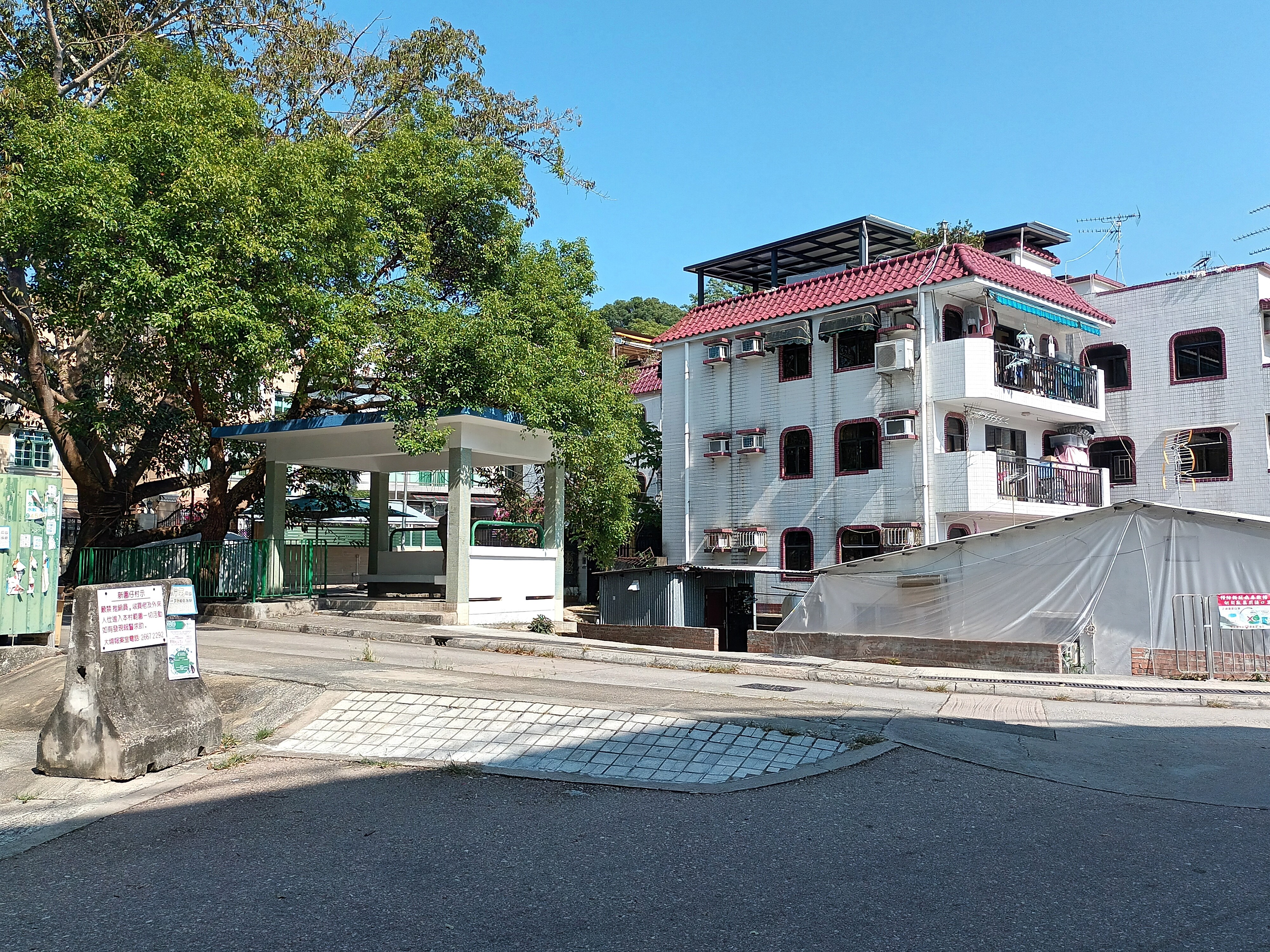
San Wai Tsai.

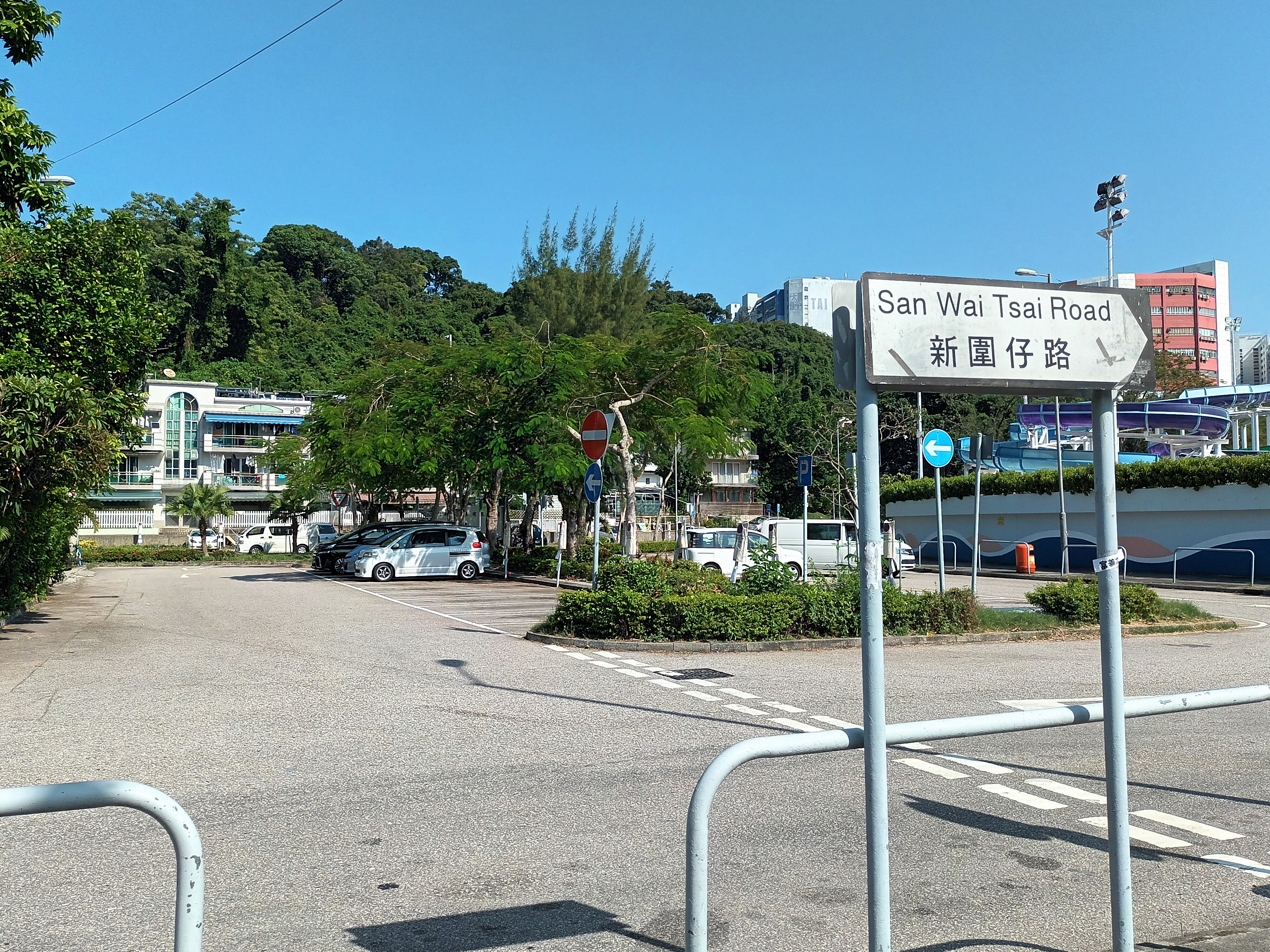
San Wai Tsai Road at San Wai Tsai. Tai Po Swimming Pool is visible on the right in the background.

San Wai Tsai (Chinese: 新圍仔) is a village in Tai Po District, Hong Kong.

== Administration ==
San Wai Tsai is a recognized village under the New Territories Small House Policy. It is one of the villages represented within the Tai Po Rural Committee. For electoral purposes, San Wai Tsai is part of the Hong Lok Yuen constituency, which was formerly represented by Zero Yiu Yeuk-sang until May 2021.

== See also ==
- Ying Pun Ha Chuk Hang, a nearby village
