= Sam Cheung =

Hong Kong politician

- 張可森
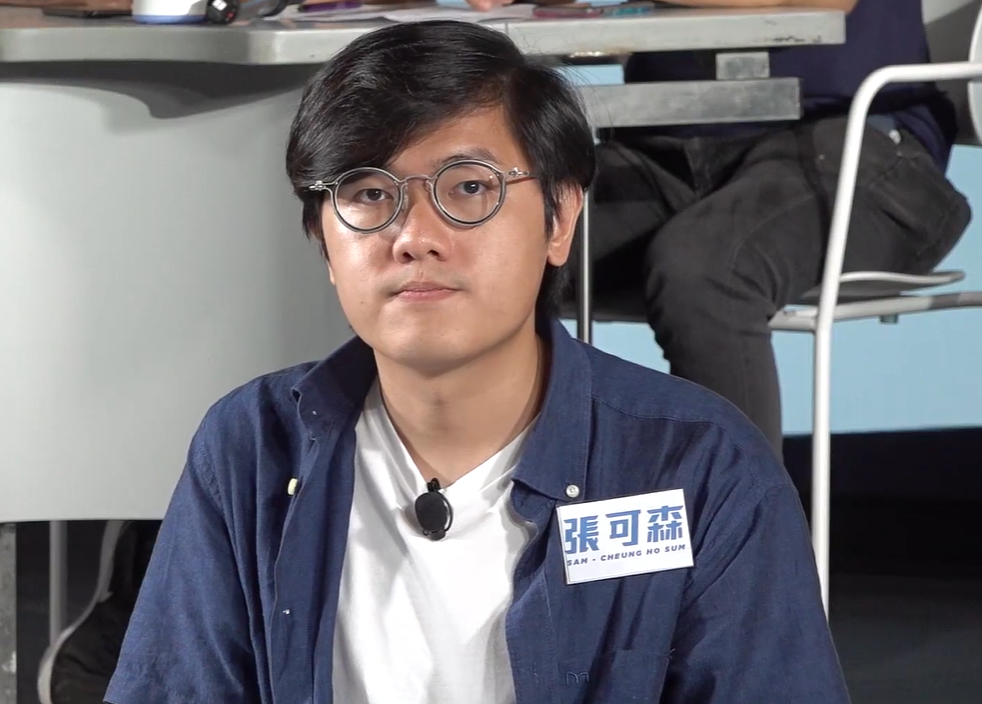
- Cheung in 2020

Member of the Tuen Mun District Council
- In office 1 January 2020 – 11 May 2021
- Preceded by: Kwu Hon-keung
- Constituency: San Hui

Personal details
- Born: 17 August 1993 (age 33) British Hong Kong
- Citizenship: Hong Kong
- Party: Tuen Mun Community Network
- Education: Hong Kong Baptist University

Sam Cheung Ho-sum (Chinese: 張可森; born 17 August 1993) is a Hong Kong politician, social activist, and former member of the Tuen Mun District Council for San Hui.

== Education ==
Cheung was educated at the Hong Kong Baptist University, where he obtained a Master of Philosophy (MPhil) from the Department of Humanities and Creative Writing. Cheung's social activism began in his first year of university, after he joined the 2012 protests against the Moral and National Education scheme. In 2014, he was an exchange student and studied in Austria. During his academic career, Cheung participated in writing contests and gained award recognition for his literary criticism.

Since high school, Cheung had a passion for songwriting, taking lessons from renowned lyricists Albert Leung and Chow Yiu-fai. In 2018, he joined the Composers and Authors Society of Hong Kong (CASH) and began to write lyrics for Cantonese songs.

Cheung's employment history included working as a teaching assistant, research assistant, and university tutor. He also earned commissions for his songwriting. He originally planned to pursue a doctoral degree in the United States, but decided to stay in Hong Kong after the protests commenced in 2019. According to Cheung, he made this decision when the protests sparked an emotional attachment to his home in Tuen Mun.

== Political career ==
=== District Council ===
Cheung was among the numerous pro-democracy activists who ran in the 2019 District Council election. He competed in the San Hui constituency under the banner "Unity of San Hui". On 25 November 2019, he was elected to the Tuen Mun District Council with 60.49% of the votes, defeating pro-establishment incumbent Kwu Hon-keung. Prior to the election, Kwu retained his position for nearly two decades until he was challenged by Cheung. Following his victory, Cheung joined the localist camp Tuen Mun Community Network, which held five seats in Tuen Mun's District Council. On 11 May 2021, Home Affairs Department confirmed that Cheung has resigned from the job title.

=== Legislative Council bid ===
In July 2020, Cheung ran in the unofficial pro-democracy primaries for the 2020 Hong Kong legislative election within the New Territories West constituency. He came in second by receiving 35,513 votes after Eddie Chu, while surpassing veteran democrats Andrew Wan and Kwok Ka-ki in fifth and sixth place respectively. Cheung earned one of the six nomination spots in the general election, along with third placer Wong Ji-yuet and fourth placer Ng Kin-wai.

On 6 January 2021, Cheung was among 53 members of the pro-democratic camp who were arrested under the national security law, specifically its provision regarding alleged subversion. The group stood accused of the organisation of and participation in the primary elections in July 2020. Cheung was released on bail on 7 January.

Political offices
Preceded by Kwu Hon-keung	Member of Tuen Mun District Council; Representative for San Hui; 2020–2021	Vacant
