= Leung King stop =

Coordinates: 22°24′24″N 113°57′50″E

Leung King 良景
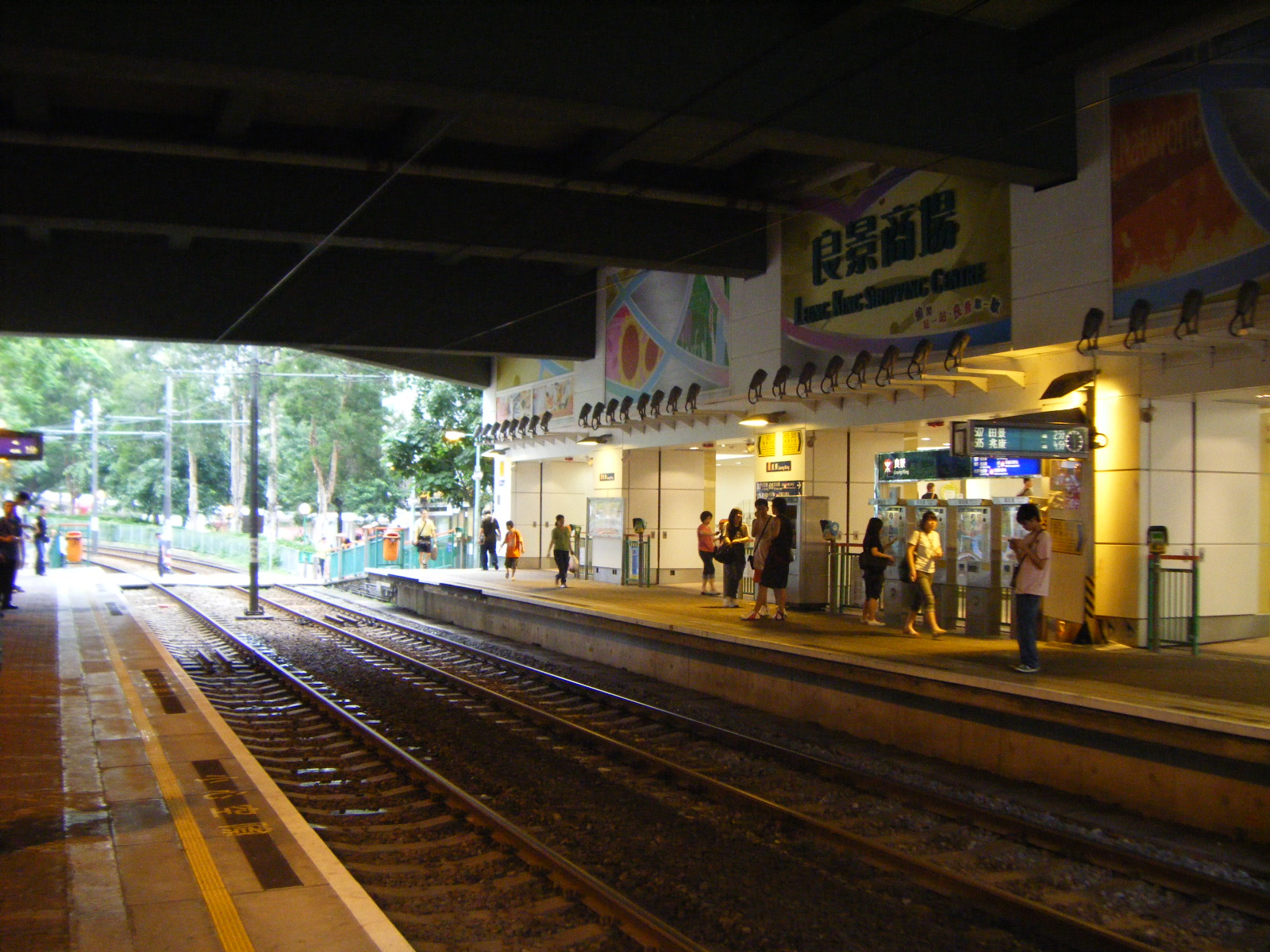
- Leung King stop's platform

General information
- Location: Leung King Estate; Tuen Mun District; Hong Kong
- System: MTR Light Rail stop
- Owner: KCR Corporation
- Operator: MTR Corporation
- Line: 505 507 615 615P
- Platforms: 2 side platforms
- Tracks: 2
- Connections: Bus, minibus

Construction
- Structure type: At-grade
- Accessible: yes

Other information
- Station code: LEK (English code); 150 (Digital code)
- Fare zone: 3

History
- Opened: 24 September 1988; 38 years ago

Services
Preceding stop	MTR Light Rail	Following stop
San Wai towards Sam Shing	505	Tin King towards Siu Hong
Tin King Terminus	507	San Wai towards Tuen Mun Ferry Pier
San Wai towards Tuen Mun Ferry Pier	615	Tin King towards Yuen Long
San Wai towards Tuen Mun Ferry Pier	615P	Tin King towards Siu Hong
Location
- Location within MTR

Leung King (Chinese: 良景) is an at-grade MTR Light Rail stop located at Tin King Road in Tuen Mun District, inside Leung King Shopping Centre in Leung King Estate. It began service on 24 September 1988 and belongs to Zone 3. It serves the Leung King Estate, Siu Lung Court, and Tin King Estate. It also includes a Light Rail customer service centre.
