= San Wai stop =

MTR Light Rail stop in Hong Kong

Coordinates: 22°24′19″N 113°57′51″E

San Wai 新圍
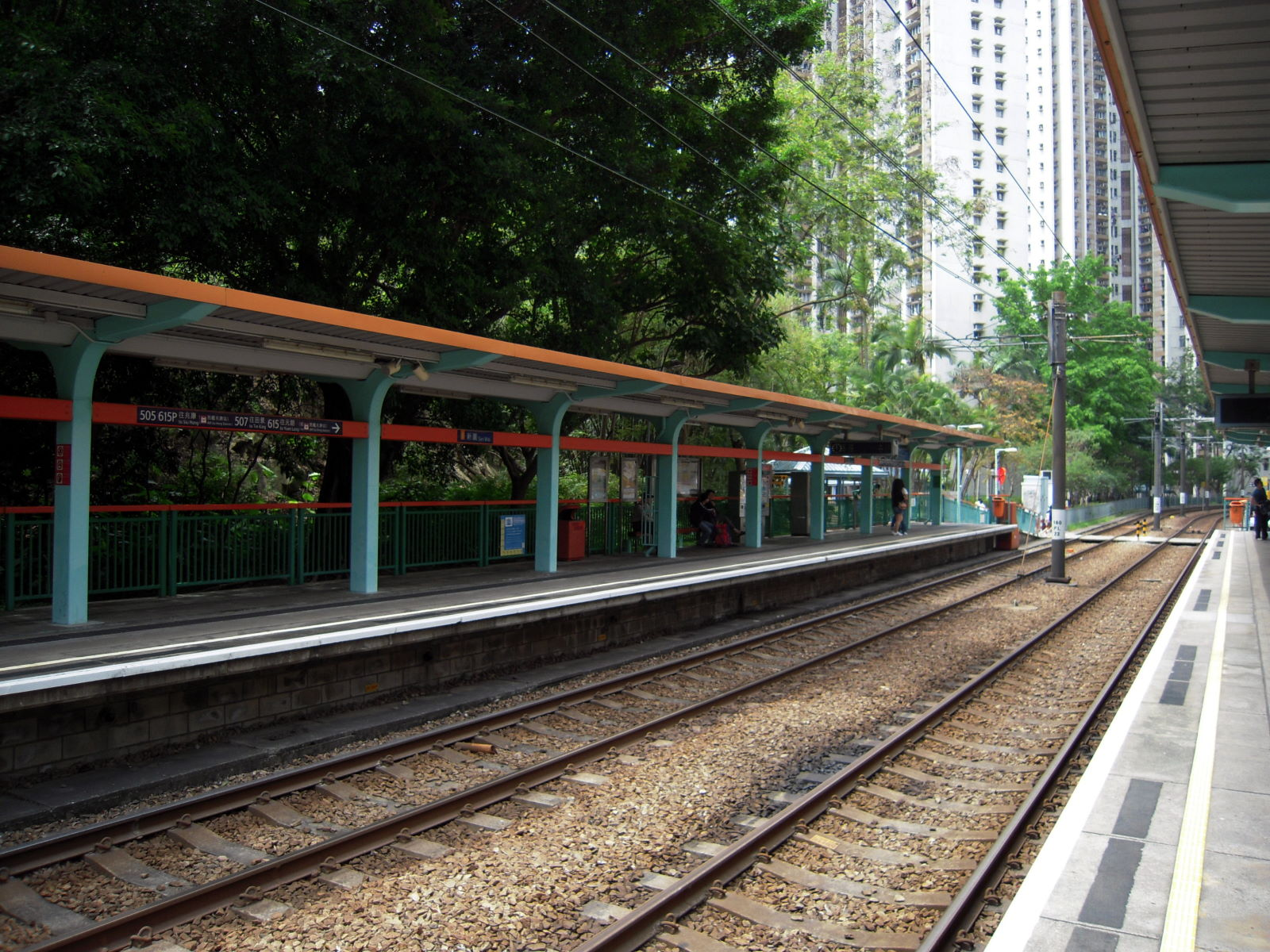
- San Wai stop platform

General information
- Location: San Wai Court; Tuen Mun District; Hong Kong
- System: MTR Light Rail stop
- Owner: KCR Corporation
- Operator: MTR Corporation
- Line: 505 507 615 615P
- Platforms: 2 (2 side platforms)
- Tracks: 2
- Connections: Bus, minibus

Construction
- Structure type: At-grade
- Accessible: yes

Other information
- Station code: SAW (English code); 160 (Digital code)
- Fare zone: 3

History
- Opened: 24 September 1988; 37 years ago

Services
Preceding stop	MTR Light Rail	Following stop
Shek Pai towards Sam Shing	505	Leung King towards Siu Hong
Leung King towards Tin King	507	Tai Hing (North) towards Tuen Mun Ferry Pier
Shek Pai towards Tuen Mun Ferry Pier	615	Leung King towards Yuen Long
Shek Pai towards Tuen Mun Ferry Pier	615P	Leung King towards Siu Hong
Location
- Location within MTR

San Wai (Chinese: 新圍) is an at-grade MTR Light Rail stop located at Tin King Road in Tuen Mun District, near San Wai Court. It began service on 24 September 1988 and belongs to Zone 3. It serves San Wai Court.
