= Tuen Mun District Council =

District council in Hong Kong

Tuen Mun District Council 屯門區議會

Type
- Type: Hong Kong District Council of Tuen Mun District

History
- Founded: 1 April 1981 (District Board); 1 July 1997 (Provisional); 1 January 2000 (District Council)

Leadership
- Chair: Michael Kwan Ke-lin, Independent
- Vice-Chair: Vacant

Structure
- Seats: 32 councillors consisting of 6 elected member 12 district committee member 13 appointed members 1 ex-officio members
- DAB: 9 / 32
- FTU: 4 / 32
- BPA: 1 / 32
- NPP: 1 / 32
- Independent: 17 / 32

Elections
- Voting system: First past the post
- Last election: 10 December 2023

Meeting place
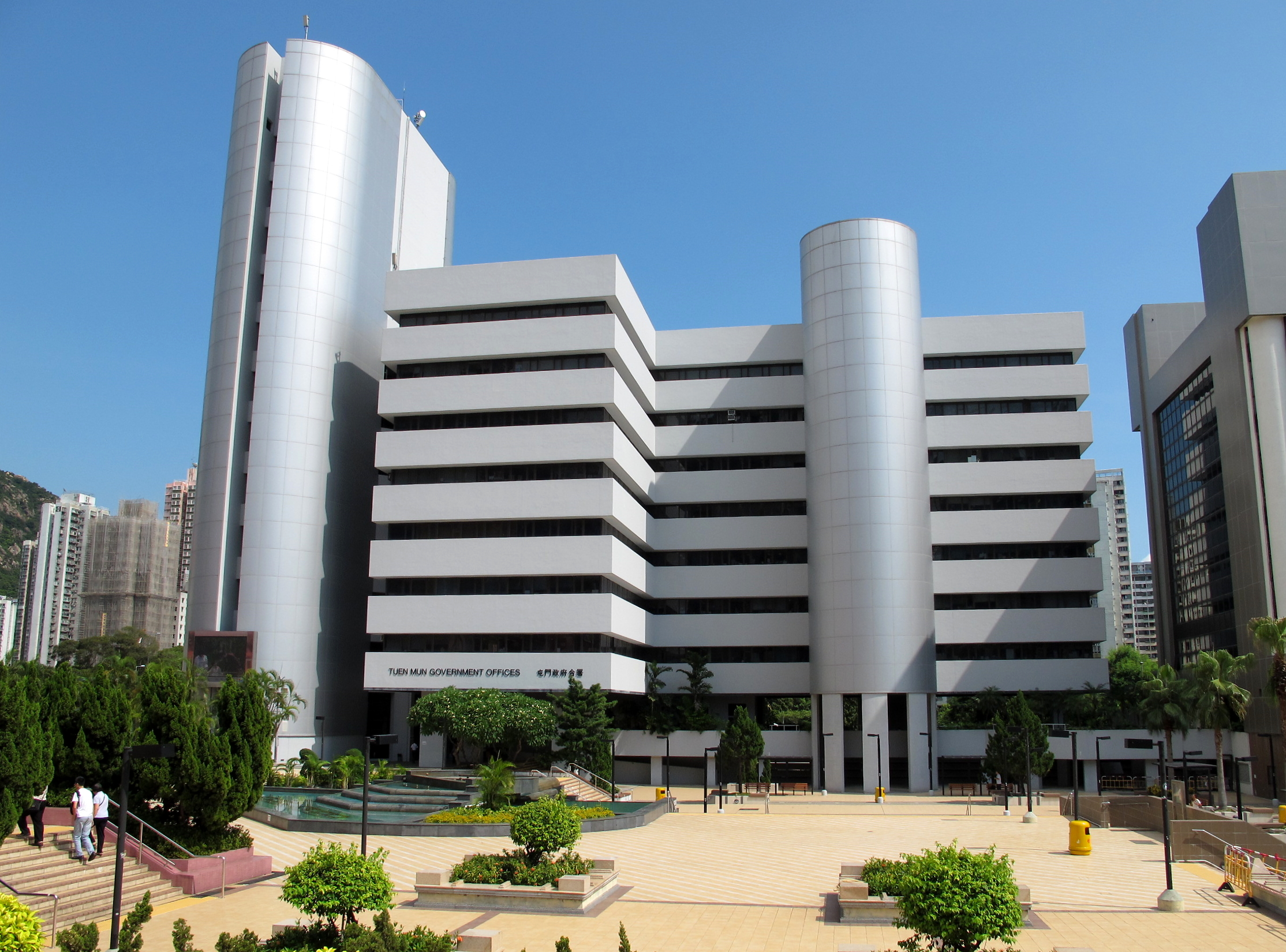
- 2/F, Tuen Mun Government Offices, 1 Tuen Hi Road, Tuen Mun, New Territories

Website
- www.districtcouncils.gov.hk/tm/

The Tuen Mun District Council (Chinese: 屯門區議會; noted as TM) is the District Council of Tuen Mun District, in the New Territories. It is one of 18 such councils. The Council consists of 32 members with 6 members of those elected through first past the post system every four years, 12 district committee members, 13 appointed members, and 1 ex officio member who is the Tuen Mun Rural Committee chairman. The latest election was held on 10 December 2023.

== History ==
The Tuen Mun District Council was established on 1 April 1981 under the name of the Tuen Mun District Board as the result of the colonial Governor Murray MacLehose's District Administration Scheme reform. The District Board was partly elected with the ex-officio Regional Council members and Tuen Mun Rural Committee chairman, as well as members appointed by the Governor until 1994 when last Governor Chris Patten refrained from appointing any member. Rural leaders and indigenous inhabitants like Lau Wong-fat had dominated local political scene in the early and mid-1980s.

The Tuen Mun District Board became Tuen Mun Provisional District Board after the Hong Kong Special Administrative Region (HKSAR) was established in 1997 with the appointment system being reintroduced by Chief Executive Tung Chee-hwa. The current Tuen Mun District Council was established on 1 January 2000 after the first District Council election in 1999. The appointed seats were abolished in 2015 after the modified constitutional reform proposal was passed by the Legislative Council in 2010.

As a new town in the 1980s, Tuen Mun was a strategic target for emerging pro-democracy activists, notably the Meeting Point. Ng Ming-yum was first elected in the 1985 election with the highest votes in the territory and was re-elected with high votes in 1988 and 1991 and later on elected to the Legislative Council in 1991. Another pro-democracy party Hong Kong Association for Democracy and People's Livelihood (ADPL) and pro-Taipei 123 Democratic Alliance also established their bases in the 1990s. In the 1994 election, the pro-democracy and pro-Taipei together gained the control of the council.

The Tuen Mun District Council is also dominated by the rural forces. Long-time Heung Yee Kuk chairman Lau Wong-fat was the long-time chairman of the council from 1985 up until 2011, and again from 2011 to 2015, on the capacity of Tuen Mun Rural Committee chairman. In 1994 when the pro-democrat and pro-Taipei councillors controlled the board, the 123 Democratic Alliance defected and elected Lau to be the chairman. Lau chairmanship was interrupted in 2011 when his rural committee chairmanship was taken away by Junius Ho. Leung Kin-man of the Democratic Alliance for the Betterment and Progress of Hong Kong (DAB), which rapidly developed its base in the district after the handover, took the chairmanship briefly and again became the council chairman since 2015.

The Democratic Party chairman Albert Ho was a long time councillor in the district, representing Lok Tsui, until he was defeated in the 2015 District Council election when he was ousted by Junius Ho, which eliminated Albert Ho's eligibility to run in the District Council (Second) constituency for the Legislative Council. The Democratic Party also suffered a huge defeat in the district, dropping their seats from seven to four.

Amid the massive pro-democracy protests in 2019, Junius Ho who was a key anti-protest figure who was allegedly involved in the Yuen Long attack was challenged by Democratic Party's Lo Chun-yu in his constituency in the November election, with Lo's party winning eight seats. A historic landslide victory occurred as the pro-democrats took 28 of the 31 seats in the council with Ho being unseated. A localist political group Tuen Mun Community Network also grabbed four seats as a result.

== Political control ==
Since 1982 political control of the council has been held by the following parties:

Camp in control	Largest party	Years	Composition
No overall control	None	1982–1985	
Pro-government	PCPHP	1985–1988	
Pro-government	Meeting Point	1988–1991	
Pro-government	United Democrats	1991–1994	
Pro-democracy	Democratic	1994–1997	
Pro-Beijing	Democratic	1997–1999	
Pro-Beijing	Democratic	2000–2003	
Pro-Beijing	DAB	2004–2007	
Pro-Beijing	DAB	2008–2011	
Pro-Beijing	DAB	2012–2015	
Pro-Beijing	DAB	2016–2019	
Pro-democracy→No overall control	Democratic → ADPL	2020–2023	
Pro-Beijing	DAB	2024–2027	

== Political makeup ==

Elections are held every four years.

Political party	Council members							Current members
Political party	1994	1999	2003	2007	2011	2015	2019	Current members
Independent	3	6	6	8	8	5	5	11 / 31
Democratic	9	9	9	7	7	4	8	5 / 31
ADPL	4	4	4	2	2	3	5	5 / 31
TMCN	-	-	-	-	-	-	4	4 / 31
Labour	-	-	-	-	-	1	2	2 / 31
DAB	2	7	9	11	12	8	1	1 / 31
FTU	-	-	-	-	-	4	1	1 / 31
BPA	-	-	-	-	-	-	1	1 / 31
EHK	-	-	-	-	-	-	1	1 / 31
LMCG	-	-	-	-	-	-	1	1 / 31

== District result maps ==
1994

1999

2003

2007

2011

2015

2019

== Members represented ==
Capacity	Code	Constituency	Name	Political affiliation	Term		Notes
Elected	L01	Tuen Mun East	Ken Fung Pui-yin	FTU	1 January 2024	Incumbent	
Elected	L01	Tuen Mun East	Terry Yip Man-pan	DAB	1 January 2024	Incumbent	
Elected	L02	Tuen Mun West	Chung Kin-fung	DAB	1 January 2024	Incumbent	
Elected	L02	Tuen Mun West	Simon Tsui Fang	FTU	1 January 2024	Incumbent	
Elected	L03	Tuen Mun North	Apple Lai Ka-man	DAB/NTAS	1 January 2024	Incumbent	
Elected	L03	Tuen Mun North	So Ka-man	NPP	1 January 2024	Incumbent	
District Committees			Tsang Hin-hong	DAB	1 January 2024	Incumbent	
District Committees			Ching Chi-hung	DAB	1 January 2024	Incumbent	
District Committees			Chan Tsim-heng	DAB	1 January 2024	Incumbent	
District Committees			Johnny Ip Chun-yuen	DAB	1 January 2024	Incumbent	
District Committees			Jason Tsoi Shing-hin	DAB	1 January 2024	Incumbent	
District Committees			Leo Chan Manwell	FTU	1 January 2024	Incumbent	
District Committees			Kam Man-fung	NPP	1 January 2024	Incumbent	
District Committees			Victor Kwong Man-tik	NPP	1 January 2024	Incumbent	
District Committees			Stephen Chui King-hang	Independent	1 January 2024	Incumbent	
District Committees			Tse Yuk-ling	Independent	1 January 2024	Incumbent	
District Committees			Lam Tik-fai	Independent	1 January 2024	Incumbent	
District Committees			Li Chiu-hung	Independent	1 January 2024	Incumbent	
Appointed			Benton Ho Jun-hang	Independent	1 January 2024	Incumbent	
Appointed			Rex Mo Shing-fung	DAB	1 January 2024	Incumbent	
Appointed			Tony Chan Yau-hoi	FTU	1 January 2024	Incumbent	
Appointed			Fung Yuk-fung	FTU	1 January 2024	Incumbent	
Appointed			Chan Mang-yi	Independent	1 January 2024	Incumbent	
Appointed			Mac Chan Ho-ting	Independent	1 January 2024	Incumbent	
Appointed			Jeff Chan Kwai-wao	Independent	1 January 2024	Incumbent	
Appointed			Pamela Mak Mei-yee	Independent	1 January 2024	Incumbent	
Appointed			Kurt Tsang Hing-chung	Independent	1 January 2024	Incumbent	
Appointed			Wan Tin-chong	Independent	1 January 2024	Incumbent	
Appointed			Kenneth Yip Kat-kong	Independent	1 January 2024	Incumbent	Suspended for one week in September 2025
Appointed			Andy Cheng Yin-kwan	Independent	1 January 2024	Incumbent	
Appointed			Steve Tse Wing-hang	Independent	1 January 2024	Incumbent	
Ex Officio		Tuen Mun Rural Committee Chairman	Kenneth Lau Ip-keung	BPA	1 January 2024	Incumbent	

== Leadership ==
=== Chairs ===
Since 1985, the chairman is elected by all the members of the board:

Chairman	Years	Political Affiliation
Billy C. L. Lam	1981–1983	District Officer
Ricky C. C. Fung	1983–1985	District Officer
Lau Wong-fat	1985–2011	Heung Yee Kuk→Liberal→ES
Leung Kin-man	2011	DAB
Lau Wong-fat	2012–2015	ES→BPA
Leung Kin-man	2016–2019	DAB
Josephine Chan Shu-ying	2020–2021	Democratic
Chan Yau-hoi	2021–2023	FTU
Michael Kwan Ke-lin	2024–present	District Officer

=== Vice Chairs ===
Vice Chairman	Years	Political Affiliation
Leung Kin-man	2000–2011	DAB
Lau Chi-pang	2011	Independent
Leung Kin-man	2012–2015	DAB
Lothar Lee Hung-sham	2016–2019	FTU
Wong Tan-ching	2020–2023	TMCN→Independent
