= Mong Kok East (constituency) =

- Elected constituency for the Yau Tsim Mong District Council
- Boundary of Mong Kok East in Yau Tsim Mong District
- District: Mong Kok (1982–1994); Yau Tsim Mong (1994–present)
- Legislative Council constituency: Kowloon West
- Population: 16,568 (2019)
- Electorate: 6,443 (2019)

Current constituency
- Created: 1982
- Number of members: One
- Member(s): vacant

Mong Kok East is one of the 20 constituencies in the Yau Tsim Mong District.

The constituency returns one district councillor to the Yau Tsim Mong District Council, with an election every four years. The seat is currently vacant, the former district councillor is Ben Lam from (Community March).

Mong Kok East constituency is loosely based on eastern part of Mongkok with estimated population of 15,444.

== Councillors represented ==
Election	Member	Party
1982	Lau Tak-kei	Civic Association
1985	Lau Tak-kei	Nonpartisan
1988	Fung Kong	Nonpartisan
1991	Lee Tin-kiu	Nonpartisan
1994	Lee Tin-kiu	123DA
1994	Law Wing-cheung	Independent
2011	Wong Kin-san	Independent
2016	Wong Kin-san	KWND/BPA
2019	Ben Lam→vacant	Community March

== Election results ==
=== 2010s ===
Yau Tsim Mong District Council Election, 2019: Mong Kok East
Party	Candidate	Votes	%	±%
Community March	Ben Lam	2,663	59.39	
BPA	Wong Kin-san	1,821	40.61	−14.59
Majority		842	18.78	
Turnout		4,518	70.14	
Community March gain from BPA		Swing		

Yau Tsim Mong District Council Election, 2015: Mong Kok East
Party	Candidate	Votes	%	±%
Nonpartisan	Wong Kin-san	1,442	55.2	+5.3
Democratic	Lau Chun-yip	1,172	44.8	+5.3
Independent	Jefferson Keller Tse	112	4.3	
Majority		270	10.4	+0.1
Turnout		2,747	45.2	
Independent hold		Swing		

Yau Tsim Mong District Council Election, 2011: Mong Kok East
Party	Candidate	Votes	%	±%
Independent	Wong Kin-san	1,110	49.87	
Democratic	Lau Chun-yip	880	39.53	
People Power (Frontier)	Yuen Chiu-tat	214	9.61	
SDA	James Lung Wai-man	22	0.99	
Majority		230	10.33	
Independent gain from Independent		Swing		

=== 2000s ===
Yau Tsim Mong District Council Election, 2007: Mong Kok East
Party	Candidate	Votes	%	±%
Independent	Law Wing-cheung	1,084	73.74	
Independent	Chun Fei-pang	386	26.26	
Majority		698	47.48	
Independent hold		Swing		

Yau Tsim Mong District Council Election, 2003: Mong Kok East
Party	Candidate	Votes	%	±%
Independent	Law Wing-cheung	Uncontested		
Independent hold		Swing		

=== 1990s ===
Yau Tsim Mong District Council Election, 1999: Mong Kok East
Party	Candidate	Votes	%	±%
Independent	Law Wing-cheung	1,204	66.70	+22.34
123DA	Tak Sik-kwan	601	33.30	+5.82
Majority		603	33.41	+17.21
Independent hold		Swing		

Yau Tsim Mong District Board Election, 1994: Mong Kok East
Party	Candidate	Votes	%	±%
MKRA	Law Wing-cheung	857	44.36	−8.39
PAS	Charles Wu Yan-yu	544	28.16	
123DA	Lee Tin-kiu	531	27.48	−9.76
Majority		313	16.20	−7.58
Nonpartisan gain from 123DA		Swing		

Mong Kok District Board Election, 1991: Mong Kok East
Party	Candidate	Votes	%	±%
Nonpartisan	Lee Tin-kiu	677	37.24	
MKRA	Lau Tak-kei	654	35.97	−21.90
MKYNS	Kwan Wan-ying	487	26.79	
Majority		23	1.26	−7.58
Nonpartisan gain from Nonpartisan		Swing		

=== 1980s ===
Mong Kok District Board Election, 1988: Mong Kok East
Party	Candidate	Votes	%	±%
Nonpartisan	Fung Kong	741	44.27	
Nonpartisan	Lau Tak-kei	593	35.42	−21.90
Nonpartisan	Lo Hok-yan	340	20.31	
Majority		148	8.84	−5.99
Nonpartisan gain from Nonpartisan		Swing		

Mong Kok District Board Election, 1985: Mong Kok East
Party	Candidate	Votes	%	±%
Nonpartisan	Lau Tak-kei	1,301	57.31	+12.57
MKFA	Chow Hing-chun	969	42.69	+18.92
Majority		332	14.63	+1.38
Nonpartisan hold		Swing		

Mong Kok District Board Election, 1982: Mong Kok East
Party	Candidate	Votes	%	±%
Civic	Lau Tak-kei	655	44.74	
Civic	Lau Chi-man	461	31.49	
Nonpartisan	Chow Hing-chun	348	23.77	
Majority		194	13.25	
Civic win (new seat)				
