= Tsim Sha Tsui Central (constituency) =

- Elected constituency for the Yau Tsim Mong District Council
- Boundary of Tsim Sha Tsui Central in Yau Tsim Mong District
- District: Yau Tsim Mong
- Legislative Council constituency: Kowloon West
- Population: 14,762 (2019)
- Electorate: 4,788 (2019)

Current constituency
- Created: 2015
- Number of members: One
- Member: vacant
- Created from: Tsim Sha Tsui East

Tsim Sha Tsui Central (Chinese: 尖沙咀中) is one of the 20 constituencies in the Yau Tsim Mong District of Hong Kong created in 2015.

The constituency loosely covers Tsim Sha Tsui with the estimated population of 16,871.

== Councillors represented ==
Election	Member	Party
2015	Kwan Sau-ling	DAB
2019	Ho Cheuk-hin→vacant	Community March

== Election results ==
=== 2010s ===
Yau Tsim Mong District Council Election, 2019: Tsim Sha Tsui Central
Party	Candidate	Votes	%	±%
Community March	Ho Cheuk-hin	1,533	56.78	
DAB	Kwan Sau-ling	1,167	43.22	−26.08
Majority		366	13.56	
Turnout		2,711	56.66	
Community March gain from DAB		Swing		

Yau Tsim Mong District Council Election, 2015: Tsim Sha Tsui Central
Party	Candidate	Votes	%	±%
DAB	Kwan Sau-ling	1,099	69.3	
Nonpartisan	Liu Siu-fai	486	30.7	
Majority		613	38.6	
Turnout		1,658	30.2	
DAB win (new seat)				
