= Tai Nan (constituency) =

- Elected constituency for the Yau Tsim Mong District Council
- Boundary of Tai Nan in Yau Tsim Mong District
- District: Yau Tsim Mong
- Legislative Council constituency: Kowloon West
- Population: 20,254 (2019)
- Electorate: 7,408 (2019)

Current constituency
- Created: 1994
- Number of members: One
- Member: vacant

Tai Nan (Chinese: 大南) is one of the 20 constituencies in the Yau Tsim Mong District. The constituency returns one district councillor to the Yau Tsim Mong District Council, with an election every four years.

Tai Nan constituency is loosely based on the area surrounding Tai Nan Street in western Mong Kok south of Boundary Street and North of Prince Edward Road West with estimated population of 20,432.

== Councillors represented ==
Election	Member	Party
1994	Wong Che-ming	Independent
2007	Francis Chong Wing-charn	Independent
2008	Francis Chong Wing-charn	KWND
2012	Francis Chong Wing-charn	KWND/BPA
2019 by-election	Li Sze-man	BPA
2019	Lee Kwok-kuen→vacant	Community March

== Election results ==
=== 2010s ===
Yau Tsim Mong District Council Election, 2019: Tai Nan
Party	Candidate	Votes	%	±%
Community March	Lee Kwok-kuen	2,943	58.32	+12.55
BPA	Li Sze-man	2,046	40.55	−13.67
Nonpartisan	Choi Ki-lung	57	1.13	
Majority		897	17.77	
Turnout		5,058	68.31	
Community March gain from BPA		Swing		

Tai Nan by-election, 2019
Party	Candidate	Votes	%	±%
BPA	Li Sze-man	1,343	54.22	
Community March	Lee Kwok-kuen	1,134	45.77	
Majority		209	8.45	
Turnout		2,495	34.38	
BPA hold		Swing		

Yau Tsim Mong District Council Election, 2015: Tai Nan
Party	Candidate	Votes	%	±%
KWND (BPA)	Francis Chong Wing-charn	1,424	47.59	+10.20
Democratic	Joshua Fung Man-tao	962	32.15	
Youngspiration	Chiu Yuk-kwong	606	20.25	
Majority		462	15.44	
Turnout		2,992	40.32	
KWND hold		Swing		

Yau Tsim Mong District Council Election, 2011: Tai Nan
Party	Candidate	Votes	%	±%
Independent	Francis Chong Wing-charn	1,076	37.39	−19.20
Democratic Coalition	Henry Chan Man-yu	905	31.45	
FLU	Tam Kam-lin	484	16.82	
LSD	Avery Ng Man-yuen	413	14.35	
Majority		171	5.94	
Independent hold		Swing		

=== 2000s ===
Yau Tsim Mong District Council Election, 2007: Tai Nan
Party	Candidate	Votes	%	±%
Independent	Francis Chong Wing-charn	1,103	56.59	
ADPL	Mak Wai-ming	846	43.41	
Majority		257	13.18	
Independent gain from Independent		Swing		

Yau Tsim Mong District Council Election, 2003: Tai Nan
Party	Candidate	Votes	%	±%
Independent	Wong Che-ming	uncontested		
Independent hold		Swing		

=== 1990s ===
Yau Tsim Mong District Council Election, 1999: Tai Nan
Party	Candidate	Votes	%	±%
Independent	Wong Che-ming	1,067	55.17	−2.15
Democratic	Stanley Ng Wing-fai	867	42.68	
Majority		200	12.49	
Independent hold		Swing		

Yau Tsim Mong District Board Election, 1994: Tai Nan
Party	Candidate	Votes	%	±%
Nonpartisan	Wong Che-ming	861	57.32	
Nonpartisan	Yiu Yung-chin	641	42.68	
Majority		220	14.64	
Nonpartisan win (new seat)				
