= Yau Ma Tei South (constituency) =

- Elected constituency for the Yau Tsim Mong District Council
- Boundary of Yau Ma Tei South in Yau Tsim Mong District
- District: Yau Tsim Mong
- Legislative Council constituency: Kowloon West
- Population: 19,175 (2019)
- Electorate: 7,805 (2019)

Current constituency
- Created: 2015
- Number of members: One
- Member: Vacant

Yau Ma Tei South (Chinese: 油麻地南) is one of the 20 constituencies in the Yau Tsim Mong District. The constituency returns one district councillor to the Yau Tsim Mong District Council, with an election every four years.

== Councillors represented ==
Election	Member	Party
2015	Benny Yeung Tsz-hei	DAB
2019	Suzanne Wu Sui-shan→vacant	Community March

== Election results ==
=== 2010s ===
Yau Tsim Mong District Council Election, 2019: Yau Ma Tei South
Party	Candidate	Votes	%	±%
Community March	Suzanne Wu Sui-shan	2,984	55.10	
DAB	Benny Yeung Tsz-hei	2,432	44.90	
Majority		552	10.20	
Turnout		5,447	69.82	
Community March gain from DAB		Swing		
