= Fu Cheong (constituency) =

Hong Kong constituency

- Elected constituency for the Sham Shui Po District Council
- Boundary of Fu Cheong in Sham Shui Po District
- District: Sham Shui Po
- Legislative Council constituency: Kowloon West
- Population: 18,766 (2019)
- Electorate: 12,270 (2019)

Current constituency
- Created: 2003
- Number of members: One
- Member: Vacant
- Created from: Lai Kok; Nam Cheong West

Fu Cheong (Chinese: 富昌) is one of the 25 constituencies in the Sham Shui Po District of Hong Kong which was created in 2003.

The constituency loosely covers Fu Cheong Estate with an estimated population of 18,766.

== Councillors represented ==
Election	Member	Party
2003	Tracy Lai Wai-lan	ADPL
2011	Scott Leung Man-kwong	NCERA
2012	Scott Leung Man-kwong	KWND
2015	Scott Leung Man-kwong	BPA/KWND
2019	Wong Kit-long→Vacant	CSWWF

== Election results ==
=== 2010s ===
Sham Shui Po District Council Election, 2019: Fu Cheong
Party	Candidate	Votes	%	±%
CSWWF	Ken Wong Kit-long	4,281	51.10	
BPA (KWND)	Scott Leung Man-kwong	4,097	48.90	−9.36
Majority		184	2.20	
Turnout		8,427	68.71	
CSWWF gain from BPA		Swing		

Sham Shui Po District Council Election, 2015: Fu Cheong
Party	Candidate	Votes	%	±%
KWND	Scott Leung Man-kwong	2,973	58.26	+5.36
ADPL	Li Kwing	2,130	41.74	−0.84
Majority		843	16.42	
Turnout		5,103	47.48	
KWND hold		Swing		

Sham Shui Po District Council Election, 2011: Fu Cheong
Party	Candidate	Votes	%	±%
NCERA	Scott Leung Man-kwong	2,235	52.90	
ADPL	Tracy Lai Wai-lan	1,799	42.58	−11.67
People Power	Ip Chee-tak	191	4.52	
Majority		436	10.32	
Turnout		4,225	48.19	
[[NCERA|Nam Cheong Estate Residents Association]] gain from ADPL		Swing		

=== 2000s ===
Sham Shui Po District Council Election, 2007: Fu Cheong
Party	Candidate	Votes	%	±%
ADPL	Tracy Lai Wai-lan	1,955	54.25	−10.02
Independent	Shea Kai-chuen	1,649	45.75	
Majority		306	9.50	
ADPL hold		Swing		

Sham Shui Po District Council Election, 2003: Fu Cheong
Party	Candidate	Votes	%	±%
ADPL	Tracy Lai Wai-lan	1,910	64.27	
DAB	Lo Wing-hong	548	18.44	
Democratic	Peter Tang Chui-chung	514	17.29	
Majority		1,362	45.83	
ADPL win (new seat)				
