= Charming (constituency) =

Constituency of the Yau Tsim Mong District Council of Hong Kong

- Elected constituency for the Yau Tsim Mong District Council
- Boundary of Charming in Yau Tsim Mong District
- District: Yau Tsim Mong
- Legislative Council constituency: Kowloon West
- Population: 16,288 (2019)
- Electorate: 10,605 (2019)

Current constituency
- Created: 1999
- Number of members: One
- Member: Lee Wai-fung (Democratic)

Charming (富榮) is one of the 20 constituencies in the Yau Tsim Mong District.

The constituency returns one district councillor to the Yau Tsim Mong District Council, with an election every four years. The seat is currently held by Lee Wai-fung of the Democratic.

Provident constituency is loosely based on the Charming Garden and southwestern part of Mongkok with estimated population of 18,029.

== Councillors represented ==
Election	Member	Party
1999	James To Kun-sun	Democratic
2007	Chung Kong-mo	DAB
2019	Lee Wai-fung	Democratic

== Election results ==
=== 2010s ===
Yau Tsim Mong District Council Election, 2019: Charming
Party	Candidate	Votes	%	±%
Democratic	Lee Wai-fung	4,242	54.75	+9.35
DAB	Chung Kong-mo	3,373	43.53	−11.07
Nonpartisan	Wong Wai-tat	133	1.72	
Majority		869	11.22	
Turnout		7,781	73.38	
Democratic gain from DAB		Swing		

Yau Tsim Mong District Council Election, 2015: Charming
Party	Candidate	Votes	%	±%
DAB	Chung Kong-mo	2,473	54.6	–13.3
Democratic	Lee Wai-fung	2,053	45.4	
Majority		420	9.2	
Turnout		4,612	47.1	
DAB hold		Swing		

Yau Tsim Mong District Council Election, 2011: Charming
Party	Candidate	Votes	%	±%
DAB	Chung Kong-mo	2,401	67.9	+0.9
LSD	Yeung Ke-cheong	1,137	32.1	
DAB hold		Swing		

=== 2000s ===
Yau Tsim Mong District Council Election, 2007: Charming
Party	Candidate	Votes	%	±%
DAB	Chung Kong-mo	2,851	67.0	+23.7
Independent	Lai Lai-har	1,402	33.0	
DAB gain from Democratic		Swing		

Yau Tsim Mong District Council Election, 2003: Charming
Party	Candidate	Votes	%	±%
Democratic	James To Kun-sun	2,565	56.7	−0.3
DAB	Chung Kong-mo	1,961	43.3	+11.4
Democratic hold		Swing		

Yau Tsim Mong District Council Election, 1999: Charming
Party	Candidate	Votes	%	±%
Democratic	James To Kun-sun	1,670	57.0	
DAB	Chung Kong-mo	934	31.9	
Independent	Chan Wai	316	10.8	
Democratic win (new seat)				
