= 2007 Yau Tsim Mong District Council election =

2007 District Council election in Yau Tsim Mong

← 2003	18 November 2007	2011 →

16 (of the 20) seats to Yau Tsim Mong District Council 11 seats needed for a majority
- Turnout: 34.2%
	First party	Second party
Party	DAB	Democratic
Last election	2 seats, 25.1%	4 seats, 21.8%
Seats before	2	4
Seats won	7	1
Seat change	▲5	▼3
Popular vote	10,559	4,339
Percentage	28.0%	11.5%
Swing	▲2.9%	▼10.3%
- Colours on map indicate winning party for each constituency.

The 2007 Yau Tsim Mong District Council election was held on 18 November 2007 to elect all 16 elected members to the 20-member District Council.

== Overall election results ==
Before election:

↓
9	7
Pro-democracy	Pro-Beijing

Change in composition:

↓
3	13
Pro-dem	Pro-Beijing

Yau Tsim Mong Council election result 2007
Party	Seats	Gains	Losses	Net gain/loss	Seats %	Votes %	Votes	+/−
Independent	8	3	3	0	47.1	47.4	17,891	
DAB	7	5	0	+5	43.8	28.0	10,559	+2.9
Democratic	1	0	3	−3	6.3	11.5	4,339	−10.3
ADPL	0	0	2	−2	0	10.3	3,884	−5.9
LSD	0	0	0	0	0	2.8	1,074	
