= Olympic (constituency) =

Hong Kong constituency

Coordinates: 22.3175°N 114.1633°E

- Elected constituency for the Yau Tsim Mong District Council
- Boundary of Olympic in Yau Tsim Mong District
- District: Yau Tsim Mong
- Legislative Council constituency: Kowloon West
- Population: 17,370 (2019)
- Electorate: 6,815 (2019)

Current constituency
- Created: 2011
- Number of members: One
- Member: vacant
- Created from: Cherry; Tai Kok Tsui South

Olympic (Chinese: 奧運) is one of the 20 constituencies of the Yau Tsim Mong District Council in Hong Kong. The seat elects one member of the council every four years. It was first created in 2011 and is formerly held by the Democratic Party's James To. The boundary is loosely based on the areas around Olympian City.

== Councillors represented ==
Election	Member	Party
2011	James To Kun-sun→vacant	Democratic

== Election results ==
=== 2010s ===
Yau Tsim Mong District Council Election, 2019: Olympic
Party	Candidate	Votes	%	±%
Democratic	James To Kun-sun	2,957	58.13	+6.13
Nonpartisan	Lee Ka-hin	2,130	41.87	
Majority		827	16.26	
Turnout		5,132	75.30	
Democratic hold		Swing		

Yau Tsim Mong District Council Election, 2015: Olympic
Party	Candidate	Votes	%	±%
Democratic	James To Kun-sun	1,531	52.0	+1.4
Independent	Patrick Ko Hiu-wing	1,414	48.0	
Majority		117	2.0	–4.3
Turnout		2,961	58.1	
Democratic hold		Swing		

Yau Tsim Mong District Council Election, 2011: Olympic
Party	Candidate	Votes	%	±%
Democratic	James To Kun-sun	1,012	50.6	
Liberal	Vincent Lau Kai-kit	886	44.3	
People Power	Alaric Bazanio Chu King-leung	101	5.1	
Majority		126	6.3	(new)
Democratic win (new seat)				
