= 2015 Yau Tsim Mong District Council election =

Hong Kong local election

- 22 November 2015

All 19 seats to Yau Tsim Mong District Council 10 seats needed for a majority
- Turnout: 45.5%
	First party	Second party	Third party
Party	DAB	Democratic	Civic
Last election	8 seats, 33.2%	1 seat, 11.6%	0 seat, 3.6%
Seats before	8	1	0
Seats won	9	1	1
Seat change	▲1	Steady	▲1
Popular vote	13,622	6,576	4,222
Percentage	30.6%	14.8%	9.5%
Swing	▼2.6%	▲3.2%	▲5.9%
	Fourth party	Fifth party
Party	KWND/BPA	ADPL
Last election	Did not stand	0 seat, 6.3%
Seats before	2	1
Seats won	2	1
Seat change	Steady	Steady
Popular vote	3,136	2,980
Percentage	7.0%	6.7%
Swing	N/A	▲0.4%
- Colours on map indicate winning party for each constituency.

The 2015 Yau Tsim Mong District Council election was held on 22 November 2015 to elect all 19 members to the Yau Tsim Mong District Council.

== Overall election results ==
Before election:

↓
2	15
PD	Pro-Beijing

Change in composition:

↓
3	16
Pro-dem	Pro-Beijing

Yau Tsim Mong Council election result 2015
Party	Seats	Gains	Losses	Net gain/loss	Seats %	Votes %	Votes	+/−
DAB	9	1	0	+1	47.4	30.6	13,622	–2.6
Independent	5	2	2	0	26.3	21.9	9,751	
Democratic	1	0	0	0	5.3	14.8	6,576	–0.8
Civic	1	1	0	+1	5.3	9.5	4,222	–5.9
KWND	2	0	0	0	10.5	7.0	3,136	
ADPL	1	0	0	0	5.3	6.7	2,980	−0.4
Youngspiration	0	0	0	0	0	6.4	2,837	
FTU	0	0	0	0	0	1.5	689	
