= James To =

Hong Kong lawyer and politician

James To Kun-sun
- 涂謹申
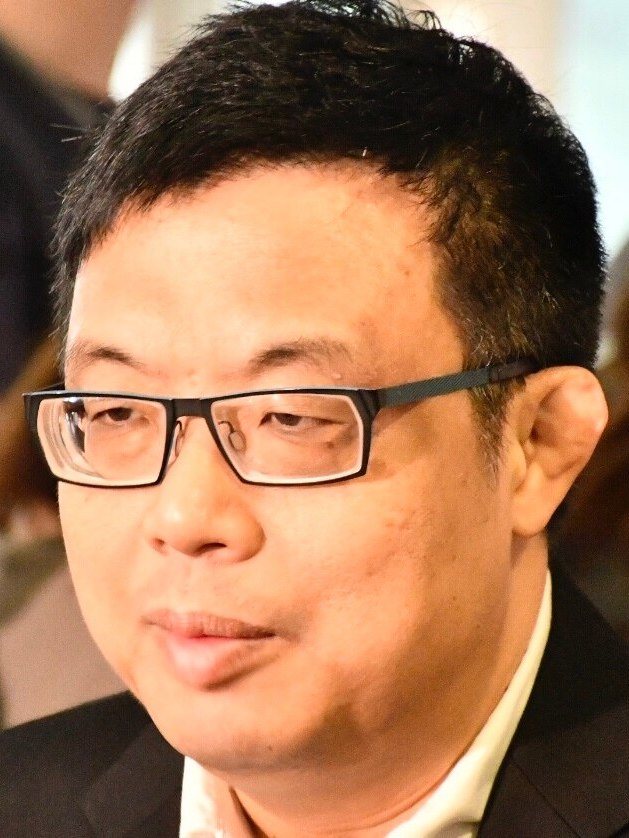
- James To in 2019

Member of the Legislative Council
- In office 1 October 2012 – 1 December 2020
- Preceded by: New constituency
- Succeeded by: Constituency abolished
- Constituency: District Council (Second)
- In office 1 July 1998 – 30 September 2012
- Preceded by: New parliament
- Succeeded by: Helena Wong
- Constituency: Kowloon West
- In office 11 October 1995 – 30 June 1997
- Preceded by: New constituency
- Succeeded by: Replaced by Provisional Legislative Council
- Constituency: Kowloon South-west
- In office 9 October 1991 – 31 July 1995
- Preceded by: New constituency
- Succeeded by: Constituency abolished
- Constituency: Kowloon West

Member of the Yau Tsim Mong District Council
- In office 1 January 2012 – 29 September 2021
- Preceded by: New constituency
- Constituency: Olympic
- In office 1 January 2000 – 31 December 2007
- Preceded by: New constituency
- Succeeded by: Chung Kong-mo
- Constituency: Charming

Member of the Sham Shui Po District Board
- In office 1991–1994 Serving with Eric Wong Chung-ki
- Preceded by: Yau Lai-ngor; Wong Ping-hon
- Succeeded by: Aaron Lam Ka-fai
- Constituency: Cheung Sha Wan

Personal details
- Born: 11 March 1963 (age 63) Hong Kong
- Party: Democratic (since 1994)
- Other political affiliations: United Democrats (1991–1994)
- Spouses: Cherry Yuen (m. 1993; div. 2008) Sue So (m. 2009)
- Education: Wah Yan College
- Alma mater: University of Hong Kong (LLB, PCLL)
- Occupation: Legislative Councillor
- Profession: Solicitor

James To
- Traditional Chinese: 涂謹申
- Simplified Chinese: 涂谨申
Transcriptions
Standard Mandarin
- Hanyu Pinyin: Tú Jǐnshēn
Yue: Cantonese
- Jyutping: Tou^{4} Gan^{2}-san^{1}

James To Kun-sun (/toʊ/; Chinese: 涂謹申; born 11 March 1963) is a Hong Kong lawyer and Democratic Party politician. From 1991 to 2020, To was a member of the Legislative Council of Hong Kong, representing the District Council (Second) constituency. In his final four years, To was the most senior member in the Legislative Council, and was also the convenor of the pro-democracy caucus from 2016 to 2017. He was also a former member of the Yau Tsim Mong District Council representing Olympic.

In November 2020, To, along with the rest of the pro-democracy caucus resigned in protest of the disqualification of four of their members.

== Early life and political career ==
To was born in Hong Kong in 1963. He was educated at the Church of Christ in China Kei Wa Primary School and Wah Yan College, Kowloon before he was enrolled to the University of Hong Kong where he graduated with a law degree, LL.B. in 1985 and PCLL in 1986, and became a lawyer after graduation.

He was involved in the local democracy movement in support of the Tiananmen protests of 1989. In 1990, he co-founded the United Democrats of Hong Kong, the first major pro-democracy party in Hong Kong later transformed into the Democratic Party. He was first elected to the Sham Shui Po District Board in 1991 in Cheung Sha Wan.

== Legislative Council ==
=== Colonial years ===
To ran in the first direct elections of the Legislative Council of Hong Kong in 1991, where he was elected with Frederick Fung of another pro-democracy party Association for Democracy and People's Livelihood (ADPL) in Kowloon West. He was Hong Kong's youngest legislator at the age of 28 when first elected. He kept his record until 2016 when Nathan Law of Demosisto was elected at the age of 23.

He was re-elected in the 1995 Legislative Council election with 69 percent of the popular vote in his Kowloon Southwest constituency. He served on the Legislative Council until 30 June 1997 at the eve of the handover of Hong Kong when he had to step down with his party and replaced by the Provisional Legislative Council.

=== After 1997 ===
He ran again the first SAR Legislative Council election in 1998 he was re-elected with Lau Chin-shek on the same ticket with 55 percent of the popular vote in Kowloon West. He has specialised in the security issues, having been the party's spokesman on security issue and chaired the Panel on Security, one of the key committees in the Legislative Council. He had closely followed the works of the Independent Commission Against Corruption, immigration issues, Vietnamese refugees, crime and triads. He also campaigned for the setup of the Independent Police Complaints Commission against police abuses of power. Due to his Christian belief, he was known for his anti-gay rights voting records despite his pro-democracy political affiliation. He was the only member of the pro-democracy camp to vote abstain in the SODO motion on 7 November 2012.

He was re-elected in Kowloon West in 2000, 2004 and 2008. In June 2010, he expressed open skepticism of the Democratic Party's support for the government's 2012 constitutional reform package but nevertheless toed the party line and voted for the measure. In the reform package, the party had secured the inclusion of a late amendment to hold a popular vote for five new District Council functional constituencies. In a dissenting speech to Legco, he warned of the creation of "super-functional constituencies" with an apparently larger mandate than that of geographical constituency lawmakers.

Nonetheless, in the 2012 Legislative Council election, he represented the party to run in the newly created territory-wide District Council (Second) constituency. His ticket received 316,468 votes in total, the largest votes in the electoral history of Hong Kong until it was exceeded by his party colleague Kwong Chun-yu in 2016.

=== 2016 election and caucus convenor ===
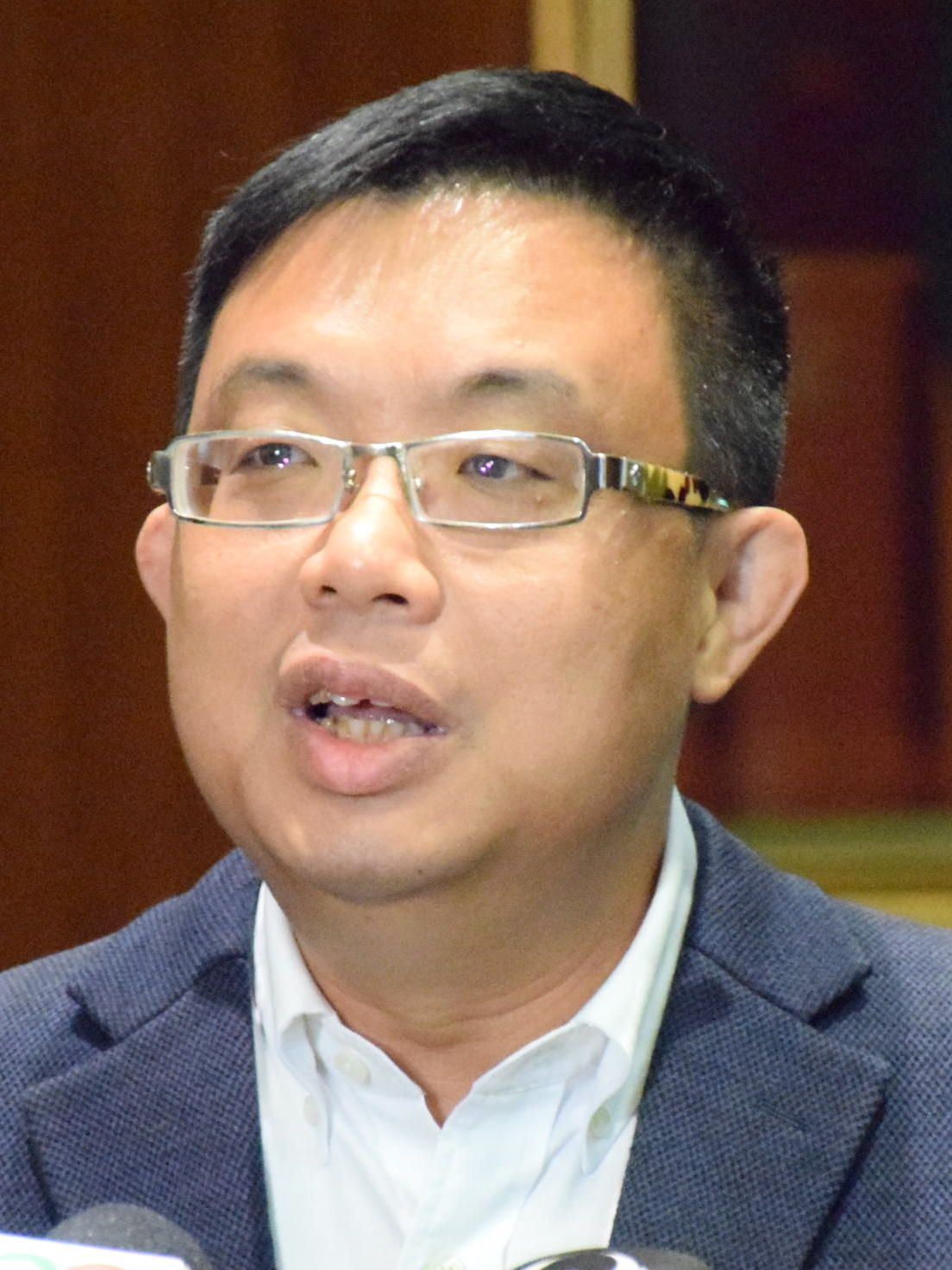
To in 2016

In 2016, he was re-elected in the District Council (Second) constituency with a sharp decline of vote due to the strategic voting of the pro-democracy voters who turned to vote for Kwong Chun-yu who was trailing behind To. As a result, To took the marginal seat with 243,930 votes, only 10,694 votes, 0.6 per cent higher than the unelected pro-Beijing candidate Wong Kwok-hing of the Hong Kong Federation of Trade Unions.

He became the most senior member of the Legislative Council, after Albert Ho retired from the legislature and Lee Cheuk-yan was surprisingly unseated, and became the last Legislative Council member from the "Class of 91", pro-democrats who first were elected in the first Legislative Council direct election in 1991. He also became the only legislator who has been directly elected in all elections since 1991 in the most senior member in the house. In October 2016, he became the convenor of the reorganised pro-democracy caucus, holding that position until 2017.

=== 2020 Democratic caucus resignation ===
On 12 November, To and 14 other members of the Democratic caucus resigned en masse in protest against the disqualification of four Democratic caucus candidates which occurred the previous day. Speaking to reporters, To said, "[The disqualifications] are an arbitrary form of repression by which the Communist Party sought to control everything."

=== Arrest ===
On 6 January 2021, To was among 53 members of the pro-democratic camp who were arrested under the national security law, specifically its provision regarding alleged subversion. The group stood accused of the organisation of and participation in unofficial primary elections held by the camp in July 2020. To was released on bail on 7 January.

On 29 September 2021, To was disqualified along with 10 other district councillors for his invalid oath-taking after he was involved with participating in the last year pro-democracy primaries.

== Personal life ==
To married Sue So on 12 December 2009. The couple had a son in 2012.

== See also ==
- Father of the House
- Senior Unofficial Member

Political offices
Preceded by Wong Ping-hon; Yau Lai-ngor	Member of Sham Shui Po District Board; Representative for Cheung Sha Wan; 1991–1994; With: Eric Wong	Succeeded by Aaron Lam
New constituency	Member of Yau Tsim Mong District Council; Representative for Charming; 2000–2007	Succeeded by Chung Kong-mo
New constituency	Member of Yau Tsim Mong District Council; Representative for Olympic; 2012–2021	Vacant
Legislative Council of Hong Kong
New constituency	Member of Legislative Council; Representative for Kowloon West; 1991–1995; Served alongside: Frederick Fung	Succeeded by Himself as Representative for Kowloon South-west
Preceded by Himself as Representative for Kowloon West	Member of Legislative Council; Representative for Kowloon South-west; 1995–1997	Replaced by Provisional Legislative Council
New parliament	Member of Legislative Council; Representative for Kowloon West; 1998–2012	Succeeded by Helena Wong
New constituency	Member of Legislative Council; Representative for District Council (Second); 2012–2020	Constituency abolished
Preceded by Albert Ho	Senior Member in Legislative Council; 2016–2020	Succeeded by Abraham Shek
Preceded by Cyd Ho	Convenor of Pro-democracy camp 2016–2017	Succeeded by Charles Mok
