= Suzanne Wu =

Hong Kong politician

- 胡穗珊
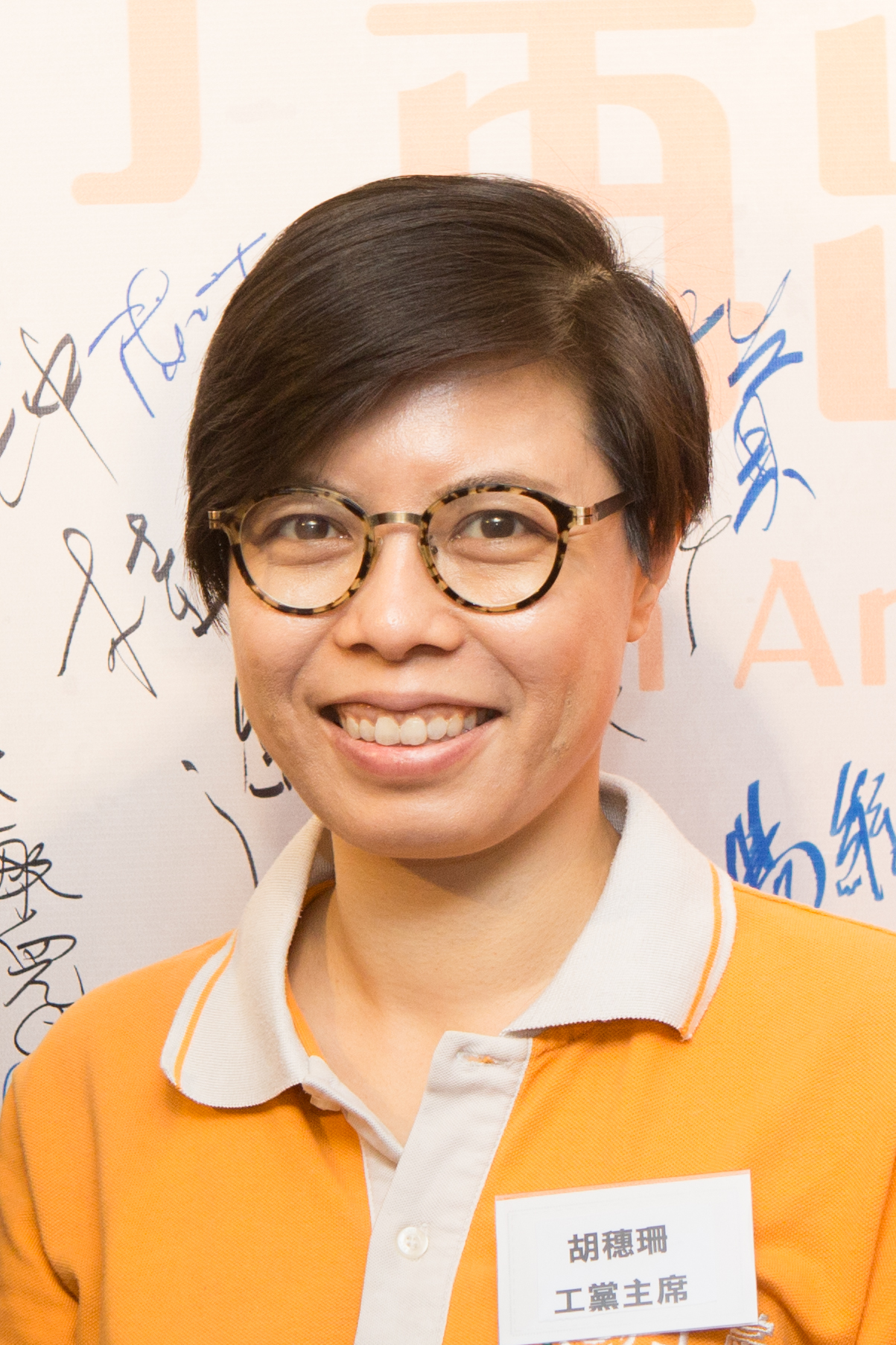

Chairwoman of the Labour Party
- In office 13 December 2015 – 22 August 2017
- Preceded by: Lee Cheuk-yan
- Succeeded by: Kwok Wing-kin

Personal details
- Born: 5 November 1980 (age 45)
- Party: Labour Party (2011–17); Community March
- Education: Hong Kong Polytechnic University; University of Warwick

Suzanne Wu Sui-shan (Chinese: 胡穗珊; born 5 November 1980) is a Hong Kong politician. She is the former chairwoman of the pro-democratic Labour Party and project coordinator of the Association for the Advancement of Feminism. After leaving Labour in 2017, she co-founded Community March.

== Biography ==
Wu graduated from the St Stephen's College and Hong Kong Polytechnic University with a degree in Language, Culture and Communication. She later went to England with a scholarship and studied at the University of Warwick with a master's degree in Gender and International Development.

She once led union members to occupy the vice chancellor’s office at the Polytechnic University to call for higher pay for the cleaning staff when she served as a student union leader at the institution. Their pay eventually was raised from some HK$4,500 to HK$6,000. She had been a director at the Hong Kong Confederation of Trade Unions (CTU), focusing on the interests of cleaning workers and security guards, and is also a project coordinator of the Association for the Advancement of Feminism, advocating gender equality. She is also a founding member of the Labour Party. On 13 December 2015, she replaced Lee Cheuk-yan as the chairwoman of the Labour Party after defeating two other candidates with about 60% support. On 23 August 2017, she resigned from the chair and withdrew from the Labour Party. Subsequently she co-founded Community March.

Party political offices
Preceded by Lee Cheuk-yan	Chairperson of the Labour Party; 2015–2017	Succeeded by Chiu Shi-shun (acting)
Political offices
Preceded by Benny Yeung Tsz-hei	Member of Yau Tsim Mong District Council; Representative for Yau Ma Tei South; 2020–2021	Vacant
