= 2019 Yau Tsim Mong District Council election =

Hong Kong local election

- 24 November 2019

All 20 seats to Yau Tsim Mong District Council 11 seats needed for a majority
- Turnout: 69.0% ▲23.5%
	First party	Second party	Third party
Party	Community March	Democratic	DAB
Last election	New party	1 seat, 14.8%	9 seats, 30.6%
Seats before	0	1	8
Seats won	5	4	1
Seat change	▲5	▲3	▼7
Popular vote	12,100	13,397	17,352
Percentage	13.6%	15.1%	19.6%
Swing	N/A	▲0.3%	▼11.0%
	Fourth party	Fifth party
Party	Civic	BPA
Last election	1 seat, 9.5%	2 seats, 7.0%
Seats before	1	4
Seats won	1	0
Seat change	Steady	▼4
Popular vote	6,762	8,176
Percentage	7.6%	9.2%
Swing	▼1.9%	▲1.2%
- Colours on map indicate winning party for each constituency.

The 2019 Yau Tsim Mong District Council election was held on 24 November 2019 to elect all 20 members to the Yau Tsim Mong District Council.

The pro-Beijing parties suffered major setbacks in the election amid the massive pro-democracy protests, while a pro-democracy local political group Community March emerged as the largest party in the council with the pro-democrats controlling the council for the first time.

== Overall election results ==
Before election:

↓
3	16
Pro-dem	Pro-Beijing

Change in composition:

↓
17	3
Pro-democracy	Pro-Beijing

Yau Tsim Mong Council election result 2019
Party	Seats	Gains	Losses	Net gain/loss	Seats %	Votes %	Votes	+/−
Independent	7	4	2	+2	25.0	30.2	26,776	
DAB	1	1	8	−7	5.0	19.6	17,352	–11.0
Democratic	4	3	0	+3	20.0	15.1	13,397	–0.3
Community March	5	5	0	+5	25.0	13.6	12,100	
BPA	0	0	4	−4	0.0	9.2	8,176	+1.2
Civic	1	0	0	0	5.0	7.6	6,762	–1.9
PfD	2	2	0	+2	10.0	4.6	4,120	
