= 1999 Yau Tsim Mong District Council election =

Hong Kong local election

- 28 November 1999

16 (of the 20) seats to Yau Tsim Mong District Council 11 seats needed for a majority
- Turnout: 28.2%
	First party	Second party
Party	Democratic	DAB
Last election	1 seat, 11.2%	1 seat, 8.0%
Seats before	2	1
Seats won	4	2
Seat change	▲2	▲1
Popular vote	6,771	3,389
Percentage	31.4%	15.7%
Swing	▲20.2%	▲7.7%
	Third party	Fourth party
Party	123DA	ADPL
Last election	1 seat, 5.7%	2 seats, 6.9%
Seats before	1	2
Seats won	1	1
Seat change	Steady	▼1
Popular vote	1,325	626
Percentage	6.1%	2.9%
Swing	▲0.4%	▼4.0%
- Colours on map indicate winning party for each constituency.

The 1999 Yau Tsim Mong District Council election was held on 28 November 1999 to elect all 16 elected members to the 20-member District Council.

== Overall election results ==
Before election:

↓
6	9
Pro-democracy	Pro-Beijing

Change in composition:

↓
7	9
Pro-democracy	Pro-Beijing

Yau Tsim Mong Council election result 1999
Party	Seats	Gains	Losses	Net gain/loss	Seats %	Votes %	Votes	+/−
Independent	8	1	1	0	43.8	42.1	9,085	
Democratic	4	2	0	+2	25.0	31.4	6,771	+20.2
DAB	2	1	0	+1	12.5	15.7	3,389	+7.7
123DA	0	0	0	0	6.3	6.1	1,325	+0.4
ADPL	1	0	1	−1	6.3	2.9	626	−4.0
HKPA	0	0	1	−1	0	0	0	
