= Scott Leung =

Hong Kong politician

The Honourable Scott Leung MH
- 梁文廣
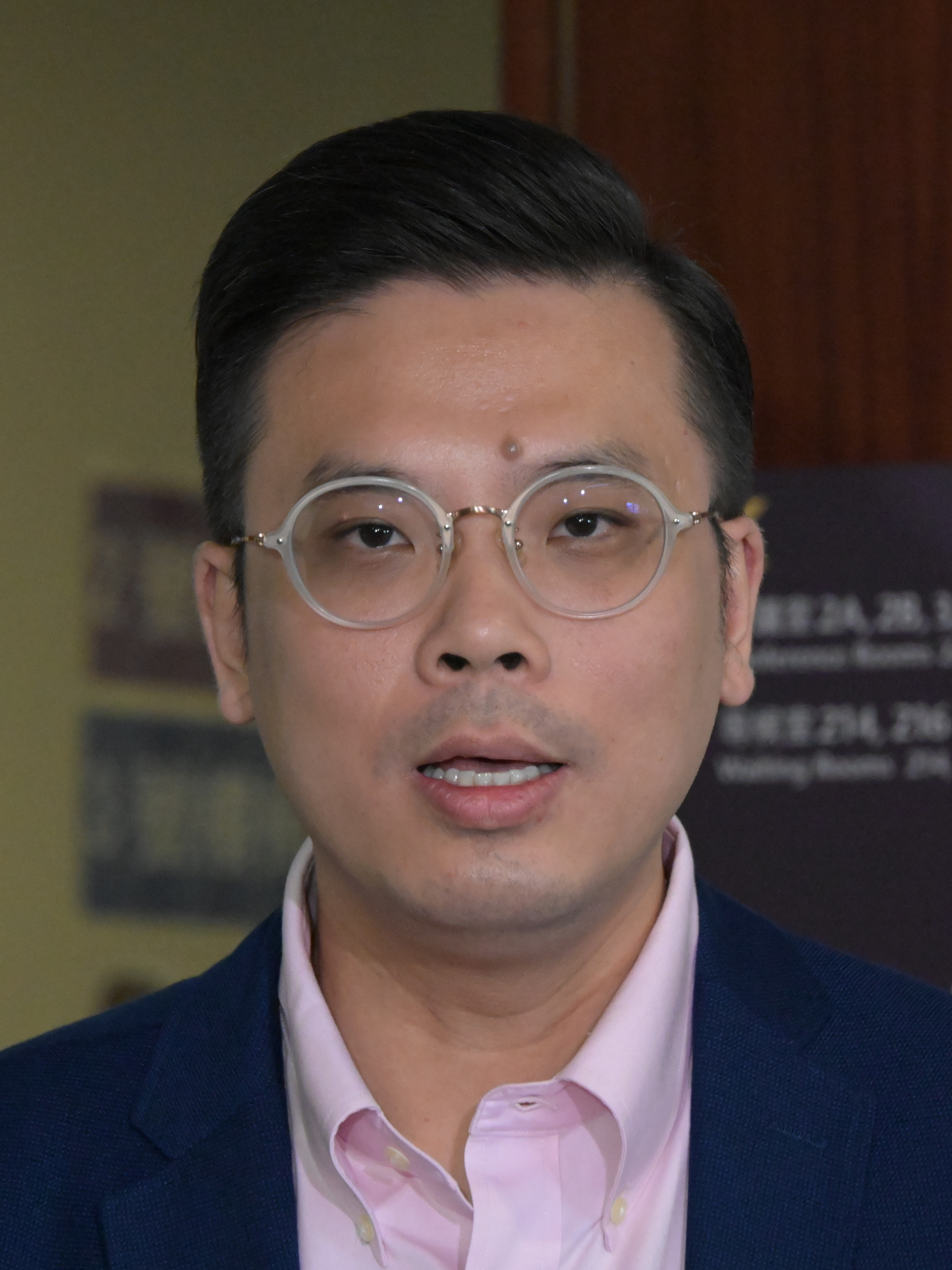
- Leung in 2023

Member of the Legislative Council
- Incumbent
- Assumed office 1 January 2022
- Preceded by: Constituency created
- Constituency: Kowloon West

Member of the Sham Shui Po District Council
- In office 1 January 2012 – 31 December 2019
- Preceded by: Tracy Lai Wai-lan
- Succeeded by: Ken Wong Kit-long
- Constituency: Fu Cheong

Personal details
- Born: 3 August 1984 (age 41)
- Party: Kowloon West New Dynamic
- Other political affiliations: Business and Professionals Alliance for Hong Kong (until 2021)

Scott Leung Man-kwong, MH (Chinese: 梁文廣, born 3 August 1984) is a Hong Kong politician of the Kowloon West New Dynamic who is the elected Legislative Council member for Kowloon West constituency since 2022.

He was re-elected through the same constituency in 2025.

== Electoral history ==
2021 legislative election: Kowloon West
Party	Candidate	Votes	%	±%
DAB	Vincent Cheng Wing-shun	64,353	54.93	N/A
KWND	Leung Man-kwong	36,840	31.45	N/A
Independent	Frederick Fung Kin-kee	15,961	13.62	N/A

2019 local elections at the Sham Shui Po District Council: Fu Cheong
Party	Candidate	Votes	%	±%
CSWWF	Wong Kit-long	4,281	51.10	N/A
BPA	Leung Man-kwong	4,097	48.90	−9.36
Majority		184	2.20	
Turnout		8,427	68.71	+21.23
CSWWF gain from BPA		Swing		

2015 local elections at the Sham Shui Po District Council: Fu Cheong
Party	Candidate	Votes	%	±%
KWND	Leung Man-kwong	2,973	58.26	+5.36
ADPL	Li Kwing	2,130	41.74	−0.84
Majority		843	16.42	
Turnout		5,103	47.48	−0.71
KWND hold		Swing		

2011 local elections at the Sham Shui Po District Council: Fu Cheong
Party	Candidate	Votes	%	±%
KWND	Leung Man-kwong	4,722	63.09	+19.03
ADPL	Tracy Lai Wai-lan	1,799	42.58	−11.67
People Power	Ip Chee-tak	191	4.52	N/A
Majority		436	10.32	
Turnout		4,225	48.19	
KWND gain from ADPL		Swing		

== Remarks ==
Political offices
Preceded by Tracy Lai	Member of Sham Shui Po District Council; Representative for Fu Cheong; 2012–2019	Succeeded by Wong Kit-long
Legislative Council of Hong Kong
New constituency	Member of Legislative Council; Representative for Kowloon West; 2022–present	Incumbent
