= 2003 Yau Tsim Mong District Council election =

Hong Kong local election

- 23 November 2003

16 (of the 20) seats to Yau Tsim Mong District Council 11 seats needed for a majority
- Turnout: 40.1%
| | First party | Second party | Third party |
|---|---|---|---|
| Party | Democratic | ADPL | DAB |
| Last election | 4 seats, 31.4% | 1 seat, 2.9% | 2 seats, 15.7% |
| Seats before | 3 | 1 | 3 |
| Seats won | 4 | 3 | 2 |
| Seat change | ▲1 | ▲2 | ▼1 |
| Popular vote | 7,419 | 5,485 | 8,532 |
| Percentage | 21.8% | 16.1% | 25.1% |
| Swing | ▼9.6% | ▲13.2% | ▲9.4% |
- Colours on map indicate winning party for each constituency.

The 2003 Yau Tsim Mong District Council election was held on 23 November 2003 to elect all 16 elected members to the 20-member District Council.

== Overall election results ==
Before election:

↓
| 7 | 9 |
| Pro-democracy | Pro-Beijing |

Change in composition:

↓
| 9 | 7 |
| Pro-democracy | Pro-Beijing |

Yau Tsim Mong Council election result 2003
| Party | Seats | Gains | Losses | Net gain/loss | Seats % | Votes % | Votes | +/− |
|---|---|---|---|---|---|---|---|---|
| Independent | 7 | 1 | 3 | −2 | 43.8 | 34.9 | 11,853 | |
| DAB | 2 | 0 | 1 | −1 | 12.5 | 25.1 | 8,532 | +9.4 |
| Democratic | 4 | 1 | 0 | +1 | 25.0 | 21.8 | 7,419 | −9.6 |
| ADPL | 3 | 2 | 0 | +2 | 18.6 | 16.1 | 5,485 | +13.2 |
| 7.1 People Pile | 0 | 0 | 0 | 0 | 0 | 2.1 | 707 | |
