= 2011 Yau Tsim Mong District Council election =

Hong Kong local election

- 6 November 2011

17 (of the 20) seats to Yau Tsim Mong District Council 11 seats needed for a majority
- Turnout: 37.9%
	First party	Second party
Party	DAB	Democratic
Last election	7 seats, 28.0%	1 seat, 11.5%
Seats before	7	1
Seats won	8	1
Seat change	▲1	Steady
Popular vote	13,369	4,659
Percentage	33.2%	11.6%
Swing	▲5.2%	▲0.1%
- Colours on map indicate winning party for each constituency.

The 2011 Yau Tsim Mong District Council election was held on 6 November 2011 to elect all 17 elected members to the 20-member District Council.

== Overall election results ==
Before election:

↓
2	14
PD	Pro-Beijing

Change in composition:

↓
2	15
PD	Pro-Beijing

Yau Tsim Mong Council election result 2011
Party	Seats	Gains	Losses	Net gain/loss	Seats %	Votes %	Votes	+/−
DAB	8	1	0	+1	47.1	33.2	13,369	+5.2
Independent	8	1	1	0	47.1	30.7	12,331	
Democratic	1	1	1	0	5.9	11.6	4,659	+0.1
ADPL	0	0	0	0	0	6.3	2,549	−5.2
LSD	0	0	0	0	0	4.5	1,804	+2.4
Civic	0	0	0	0	0	3.6	1,458	
Democratic Coalition	0	0	0	0	0	2.3	905	−13.8
Liberal	0	0	0	0	0	2.2	886	
People Power	0	0	0	0	0	1.8	720	
FLU	0	0	0	0	0	1.2	484	
SDA	0	0	0	0	0	1.2	469	
HKAA	0	0	0	0	0	1.0	418	
TUC	0	0	0	0	0	0.4	165	
