= Community March =

Hong Kong political organisation

Community March 社區前進
- Convenor: Ben Lam
- Founded: Late 2017
- Dissolved: 8 September 2021
- Ideology: Liberalism (Hong Kong); Social democracy
- Political position: Centre-left
- Regional affiliation: Pro-democracy camp
- Colours: Green

Website
- www.facebook.com/communitymarch/

Community March (Chinese: 社區前進) was a district-based political group formed in late 2017 in Hong Kong by a group of pro-democracy social activists. It was founded in 2017 and was dissolved in 2021 following Hong Kong Special Administrative Region government investigations into "unpatriotic" activities.

== History ==
Community March was founded by the former chairwoman of the Labour Party, Suzanne Wu. The party was founded in 2017 following the Occupy Hong Kong movement with the intent of strengthening civil society, being pro-labour and to campaign for universal suffrage within Hong Kong. The group was actively planning to field candidates in the 2019 District Council elections in Yau Tsim Mong and Sham Shui Po, after their unsuccessful first attempt in Tai Nan by-election. All 5 of its candidates were elected in the pro-democracy landslide victory, became the largest party in the Yau Tsim Mong District Council. This came on the back of a pro-democracy camp landslide at the 2019 election.

The group announced their disbandment on 8 September 2021. This came following the passage of the Hong Kong national security law, which led to three of their Yau Tsim Mong councillors resigning ahead of a government plan to investigate "unpatriotic" elected officials and enforce a new oath of allegiance. Despite complying with the official investigation, Wu and the remaining Community March councillor, Chu Kong-wai, were removed from their seats in 2021 and were disqualified from holding public office for five years.

== Performance in elections ==
=== Yau Tsim Mong District Council elections ===
Election	Number of popular votes	% of popular votes	Total elected seats	+/−
2019	12,100	13.64	5 / 20	5▲

== See also ==
- Democratic Coalition for DC Election
- Power for Democracy
