= Kowloon West New Dynamic =

Kowloon West New Dynamic 西九新動力
- Chairperson: Priscilla Leung
- Founded: 16 March 2008; 18 years ago
- Headquarters: Capital Commercial; Building, 448; Shanghai Street, Mongkok, Kowloon
- Ideology: Conservatism (HK); Economic liberalism Kowloon West Regionalism
- Political position: Centre-right
- Regional affiliation: Pro-Beijing camp
- Colors: Green
- Legislative Council: 3 / 90
- District Councils: 6 / 470

Website
- www.kowloonwest.hk

Kowloon West New Dynamic
- Traditional Chinese: 西九新動力
Transcriptions
Yue: Cantonese
- Yale Romanization: Sāi gáu sān duhng lihk
- Jyutping: Sai^{1} gau^{2} san^{1} dung^{6} lik^{6}

Kowloon West New Dynamic is a district-based pro-Beijing political group in Hong Kong. It was founded by a group of local politicians in the western part of Kowloon on 16 March 2008. The main focus of party is to improve quality of life in the districts within the area, including the Sham Shui Po District, the Kowloon City District, and the Yau Tsim Mong District. Priscilla Leung is the current chairman. The party currently holds seven seats in the District Council of Hong Kong and one seat in the Legislative Council of Hong Kong.

It played an instrumental role in electing its chairman Priscilla Leung to a seat in Kowloon West in the 2008 Legislative Council election. After Leung joined the pro-business parliamentary group Business and Professionals Alliance for Hong Kong (BPA) in October 2012, the Kowloon West New Dynamic became a subordinate group of the BPA. The group joined the election again in 2021, with Scott Leung elected as the second legislator of the party following the landslide win of pro-Beijing bloc.

== Performance in elections ==
=== Legislative Council elections ===
Election	Number of popular votes	% of popular votes	GC seats	FC seats	EC seats	Total seats	+/−	Position
2012	34,548	1.91	1	0		1 / 70	0	10th
2016	BPA ticket		1	0		1 / 70	0	—N/a
2021	36,840	2.78	1	0	0	1 / 90	0	10th
2025	25,692▼	2.01▼	1	0	0	1 / 90	0	10th

=== District Council elections ===
Election	Number of popular votes	% of popular votes	Total elected seats	+/−
2015	23,131	1.60	7 / 431	1▼
2019	10,374▼	0.35▼	0 / 452	10▼
2023	6,801▼	2.01▲	0 / 470	0
