= Kowloon West (2021 constituency) =

Geographical constituency in Hong Kong

- Geographical constituency for the Legislative Council of Hong Kong
- Boundary of Kowloon West in Hong Kong
- District: Yau Tsim Mong District; Sham Shui Po District
- Region: Kowloon
- Population: 780,000
- Electorate: 381,484

Current constituency
- Created: 2021
- Number of members: Two
- Members: Vincent Cheng (DAB); Scott Leung (KWND)
- Created from: Kowloon West (1998)

The Kowloon West geographical constituency is one of the ten geographical constituencies in the elections for the Legislative Council of Hong Kong which elects two members of the Legislative Council using the single non-transferable vote (SNTV) system. The constituency covers Yau Tsim Mong District and Sham Shui Po District in Kowloon.

== History ==
The constituency was created under the overhaul of the electoral system imposed by the Beijing government in 2021, replacing Yau Tsim Mong District and Sham Shui Po District of the Kowloon West constituency used from 1998 to 2021. Constituencies with the same name were also created for the 1991 and 1995 elections in the late colonial period, while the 1991 constituency also elected two seats with each voter having two votes.

== Returning members ==
Election	Member	Party	Member	Party
2021	Vincent Cheng	DAB	Scott Leung	KWND

== Election results ==
=== 2020s ===
2025 Legislative Council election: Kowloon West
Party	Candidate	Votes	%	±%
DAB	Vincent Cheng Wing-shun			
KWND	Leung Man-kwong			
BPA	Pong Chiu-fai			
Nonpartisan	Haywood Guan Weixi			
Nonpartisan	Lau Oi-sze			
Total valid votes				
Rejected ballots				
Turnout				
Registered electors		346,355		
		Swing		
		Swing		

Vote share
1. DAB (54.9%)
2. KWND (31.4%)
3. Nonpartisan (13.6%)

2021 Legislative Council election: Kowloon West
Party	Candidate	Votes	%	±%
DAB	Vincent Cheng Wing-shun	64,353	54.93	
KWND	Leung Man-kwong	36,840	31.45	
Nonpartisan	Frederick Fung Kin-kee	15,961	13.62	
Total valid votes		117,154	100.00	
Rejected ballots		2,650		
Turnout		119,804	31.40	
Registered electors		381,484		
DAB win (new seat)				
KWND win (new seat)				
