= Yau Tsim Mong District Council =

District council in Hong Kong

Yau Tsim Mong District Council 油尖旺區議會

Type
- Type: Hong Kong District Council of the Yau Tsim Mong District

History
- Founded: 1 October 1994 (District Board); 1 July 1997 (Provisional); 1 January 2000 (District Council)

Leadership
- Chair: Edward Yu Kin-keung, Independent

Structure
- Seats: 20 councillors consisting of 4 elected members 8 district committee members 8 appointed members
- DAB: 8 / 20
- BPA: 4 / 20
- FTU: 2 / 20
- Independent: 6 / 20

Elections
- Voting system: First past the post
- Last election: 10 December 2023

Meeting place
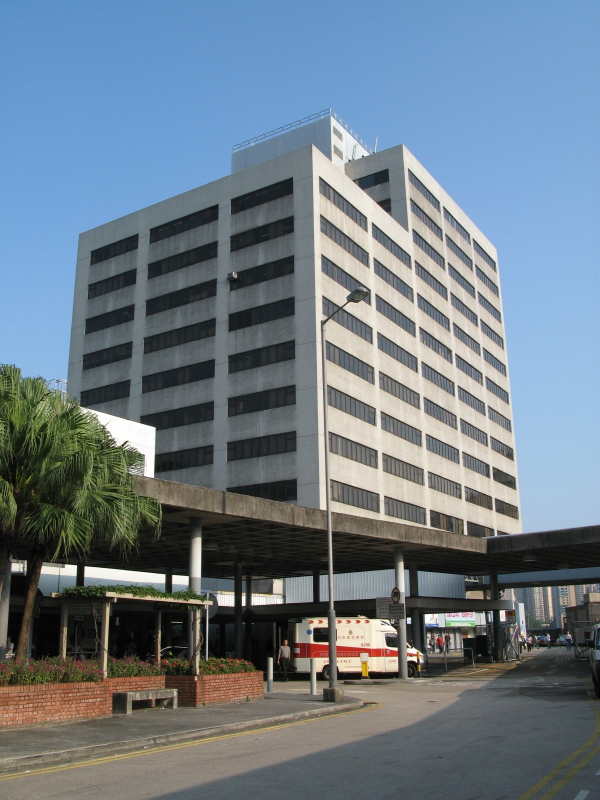
- 4/F., Mong Kok Government Offices, 30 Luen Wan Street, Kowloon

Website
- www.districtcouncils.gov.hk/ytm/

Yau Tsim Mong District Council
- Traditional Chinese: 油尖旺區議會
Transcriptions
Yue: Cantonese
- Yale Romanization: Yàuh jīm wohng kēui yih wuih
- Jyutping: Jau4 zim1 wong6 keoi1 ji6 wui6

The Yau Tsim Mong District Council (noted as YTM) is the district council for the Yau Tsim Mong District in Hong Kong. It is one of 18 such councils. The Yau Tsim Mong District Council currently consists of 20 members, of which the district is divided into two constituencies, electing a total of 4 members, 8 district committee members, and 8 appointed members. It was merged from the Mong Kok District Board and Yau Tsim District Board in 1994 due to the significant drop of the population in the districts. The latest election was held on 10 December 2023.

== History ==
The Yau Tsim Mong District Council was established on 1 October 1994 under the name of the Yau Tsim Mong District Board as the merger of Yau Tsim and Mong Kok District Boards. The two original District Boards was established as the result of the colonial Governor Murray MacLehose's District Administration Scheme reform. The District Boards were partly elected with the ex-officio Urban Council members, as well as members appointed by the Governor. In 1992, the last Governor Chris Patten announced the small District Boards would be merged. As the total number of seats of the two boards were only 27, the boards were merged into Yau Tsim Mong District Board in the 1994 election with the appointed seats abolished.

The Yau Tsim Mong District Board became Yau Tsim Mong Provisional District Board after the Hong Kong Special Administrative Region (HKSAR) was established in 1997 with the appointment system being reintroduced by Chief Executive Tung Chee-hwa. The current Yau Tsim Mong District Council was established on 1 January 2000 after the first District Council election in 1999. The council has become fully elected when the appointed seats were abolished in 2011 after the modified constitutional reform proposal was passed by the Legislative Council in 2010.

The conservative independents dominated in the district as the lack of public housing estates made it difficult for the political parties to develop their community networks. The Hong Kong Association for Democracy and People's Livelihood (ADPL), the Democratic Party and the Democratic Alliance for the Betterment and Progress of Hong Kong (DAB) had been the three major parties which had continuing presence in the district, until in the 2007 election in which the DAB took a total number of seven seats, far ahead of the Democratic Party's one seat and ADPL which lost all their seats.

Business and Professionals Alliance for Hong Kong (BPA) Legislative Councillor Priscilla Leung's Kowloon West New Dynamic also absorbed numbers of conservative independents following the 2015 election and became the second largest party in the council. However, the pro-Beijing parties suffered major setbacks in the 2019 election amid the massive pro-democracy protests, while a pro-democracy local political group Community March emerged as the largest party in the council with the pro-democrats controlling the council for the first time.

== Political control ==
Since 1994 political control of the council has been held by the following parties:

Camp in control	Largest party	Years	Composition
Pro-Beijing	ADPL	1994 - 1997	
Pro-Beijing	ADPL	1997 - 1999	
Pro-Beijing	Democratic	2000 - 2003	
Pro-Beijing	Democratic	2004 - 2007	
Pro-Beijing	DAB	2008 - 2011	
Pro-Beijing	DAB	2012 - 2015	
Pro-Beijing	DAB	2016 - 2019	
Pro-democracy	Community March → Democratic	2020 - 2023	
Pro-Beijing	DAB	2024 - 2027	

== Political makeup ==

Elections are held every four years.

Political party	Council members							Current members
Political party	1994	1999	2003	2007	2011	2015	2019	Current members
Independent	6	8	7	8	8	5	9	10 / 20
CM	-	-	-	-	-	-	5	5 / 20
Democratic	1	4	4	1	1	1	4	4 / 20
DAB	1	2	2	7	8	9	1	1 / 20

== District result maps ==
1994

1999

2003

2007

2011

2015

2019

== Members represented ==
Capacity	Code	Constituency	Name	Political affiliation	Term		Notes
Elected	E01	Yau Tsim Mong South	Chris Ip Ngo-tung	DAB	1 January 2024	Incumbent	
Elected	E01	Yau Tsim Mong South	Guan Weixi	Independent	1 January 2024	Incumbent	
Elected	E02	Yau Tsim Mong North	Lee Ka-hin	DAB	1 January 2024	Incumbent	
Elected	E02	Yau Tsim Mong North	Li Sze-man	BPA	1 January 2024	Incumbent	
District Committees			Benjamin Choi Siu-fung	DAB	1 January 2024	Incumbent	
District Committees			Craig Jo Chun-wah	DAB	1 January 2024	Incumbent	
District Committees			Lau Pak-kei	DAB	1 January 2024	Incumbent	
District Committees			Alex Poon King-wo	DAB	1 January 2024	Incumbent	
District Committees			Suen Chi-man	FTU	1 January 2024	Incumbent	
District Committees			Wong Kin-san	BPA	1 January 2024	Incumbent	
District Committees			Luk Tsz-fung	Independent	1 January 2024	Incumbent	
District Committees			Michelle Tang Ming-sum	Independent	1 January 2024	Incumbent	
Appointed			Benny Yeung Tsz-hei	DAB	1 January 2024	Incumbent	
Appointed			Edmong Chung Kong-mo	DAB	1 January 2024	Incumbent	
Appointed			Au Chor-kwan	Independent	1 January 2024	Incumbent	
Appointed			Hui Tak-leung	FTU	1 January 2024	Incumbent	
Appointed			Chan Siu-tong	BPA	1 January 2024	Incumbent	
Appointed			Rowena Wong Shu-ming	BPA	1 January 2024	Incumbent	
Appointed			Chung Chak-fai	Independent	1 January 2024	Incumbent	
Appointed			Aruna Gurung	Independent	1 January 2024	Incumbent	

== Leadership ==
=== Chairs ===
Emblem of Mong Kok District Board (left) and Yau Ma Tei/Yau Tsim District Board (right) (1982–1994)

Between 1985 and 2023, the chairman is elected by all the members of the board.

Chairman	Years	Political Affiliation
Chairman of Mong Kok District Board and Yau Tsim Mong District Board
Mable Wong Chiu-woon	1981	District Officer
Wilfred Wong Ying-wai	1981–1984	District Officer
Bowen Joseph Leung Po-wing	1984–1985	District Officer
Chairman of Yau Ma Tei District Board
Yip Wah	1985–1994	Independent
Chairman of Mong Kok District Board
Chow Chun-fai	1985–1994	Independent
Chairman of Yau Tsim Mong District Board
Chow Chun-fai	1994–2003	Independent
Henry Chan Man-yu	2004–2007	Independent
Chung Kong-mo	2008–2015	DAB
Chris Ip Ngo-tung	2016–2019	DAB
Lam Kin-man	2020–2023	Independent
Edward Yu Kin-keung	2024–present	District Officer

=== Vice Chairs ===
Vice Chairman	Years	Political Affiliation
Ip Kwok-chung	2000–2003	DAB
Leung Wai-kuen	2004–2011	Independent
Ko Po-ling	2008–2015	Independent
Wong Shu-ming	2016–2019	KWND/BPA
Yu Tak-po	2020–2021	Civic→Independent
Chu Tsz-lok	2021–2023	Democratic
