= City One (constituency) =

Hong Kong constituency

- Former Elected constituency for the Sha Tin District Council
- Boundary of City One in Sha Tin District
- District: Sha Tin
- Legislative Council constituency: New Territories North East
- Population: 15,938 (2019)
- Electorate: 9,744 (2019)

Former constituency
- Created: 1994
- Abolished: 31 December 2023
- Number of members: One
- Member: Vacant

City One was one of the 36 constituencies in the Sha Tin District in Hong Kong. The constituency returned one district councillor to the Sha Tin District Council, with an election held every four years.

The constituency was established in 1994 and was abolished on 31 December 2023 with its area incorporated into the Sha Tin East constituency. It was loosely based on part of the City One in Sha Tin and had an estimated population of 15,938.

== Councillors represented ==
Election	Member	Party
1994	Chow Ka-kong	Independent
1999	Chow Ka-kong	Independent
2003	Chow Ka-kong	Independent
2007	Wong Ka-wing	Independent
2011	Wong Ka-wing	Independent→NPP
2015	Wong Ka-wing	NPP
2019	Wong Man-huen→Vacant (Note: Resigned on 3 June 2021 over new oath-taking laws.)	Civic

== Election results ==
=== 2010s ===
Sha Tin District Council Election, 2019: City One
Party	Candidate	Votes	%	±%
Civic	Wong Man-huen	5,122	65.04	
NPP	Wong Ka-wing	2,753	34.96	
Majority		2,369	30.08	
Turnout		7,922	81.30	
Civic gain from NPP		Swing		

Sha Tin District Council Election, 2015: City One
Party	Candidate	Votes	%	±%
NPP	Wong Ka-wing	Unopposed		
NPP hold		Swing		

Sha Tin District Council Election, 2011: City One
Party	Candidate	Votes	%	±%
Independent	Wong Ka-wing	3,060	65.9	+2.8
Civic	Ronny Tong Ka-wah	1,582	34.1	
Independent hold		Swing		

=== 2000s ===
Sha Tin District Council Election, 2007: City One
Party	Candidate	Votes	%	±%
Independent	Wong Ka-wing	2,235	63.1	−2.8
Frontier	Li Wing-shing	1,307	36.9	
Independent gain from Independent		Swing		

Sha Tin District Council Election, 2003: City One
Party	Candidate	Votes	%	±%
Independent	Chow Ka-kong	2,308	65.9	+0.7
Civil Force	Lo Tang-kwong	1,193	34.1	
Independent hold		Swing		

=== 1990s ===
Sha Tin District Council Election, 1999: City One
Party	Candidate	Votes	%	±%
Independent	Chow Ka-kong	1,858	65.2	−13.5
Independent	Chu Yun-lam	976	34.2	
Independent hold		Swing		

Sha Tin District Board Election, 1994: City One
Party	Candidate	Votes	%	±%
Independent	Chow Ka-kong	2,127	78.7	
Liberal	Chiu Siu-ping	556	20.6	
Independent win (new seat)				
