= Kwong Yuen (constituency) =

Hong Kong constituency

- 廣源
- Elected constituency for the Sha Tin District Council
- Boundary of Kwong Yuen in Sha Tin District
- District: Sha Tin
- Legislative Council constituency: New Territories South East
- Population: 13,263 (2019)
- Electorate: 9,716 (2019)

Current constituency
- Created: 1991
- Number of members: One
- Member: Vacant

Kwong Yuen
- Traditional Chinese: 廣源
Transcriptions
Yue: Cantonese
- Yale Romanization: Gwóng yùhn
- Jyutping: Gwong2 jyun4

Kwong Yuen is one of the 41 constituencies of the Sha Tin District Council. The seat elects one member of the council every four years. The constituency has an estimated population of 13,883.

== Councillors represented ==
Election	Member	Party
1991	Chau Wai-tung	United Democrats
1994	Chau Wai-tung	Democratic
1999	Yick Shun-ngo	Nonpartisan
2003	Maggie Chan Man-kuen	Civil Force
2014	Maggie Chan Man-kuen	NPP/CF
2019	Yeung Sze-kin→Vacant	Independent democrat

== Election results ==
=== 2010s ===
Sha Tin District Council Election, 2019: Kwong Yuen
Party	Candidate	Votes	%	±%
PfD	Yeung Sze-kin	3,982	57.74	
Civil Force (NPP)	Maggie Chan Man-kuen	2,914	42.26	
Majority		1,068	15.48	
Turnout		6,916	71.23	
PfD gain from Civil Force		Swing		
