= Yue Shing (constituency) =

Hong Kong constituency

- 愉城
- Elected constituency for the Sha Tin District Council
- Boundary of Yue Shing in Sha Tin District
- District: Sha Tin
- Legislative Council constituency: New Territories North East
- Population: 15,428 (2019)
- Electorate: 9,163 (2019)

Current constituency
- Created: 1994
- Number of members: One
- Member: Vacant

Yue Shing
- Traditional Chinese: 愉城
Transcriptions
Yue: Cantonese
- Yale Romanization: Yùh sìhng
- Jyutping: Jyu4 sing4

Yue Shing is one of the 36 constituencies of the Sha Tin District Council. The seat elects one member of the council every four years. The constituency has an estimated population of 15,428.

== Councillors represented ==
Election	Member	Party
1994	Lau Tai-sang	Democratic
2007	Leung Ka-fai	Civil Force
2014	Leung Ka-fai	NPP/CF
2019	William Shek→Vacant	Independent democrat

== Election results ==
=== 2010s ===
Sha Tin District Council Election, 2019: Yue Shing
Party	Candidate	Votes	%	±%
Democratic Coalition	William Shek	4,406	62.28	
NPP (Civil Force)	Leung Ka-fai	2,668	37.72	
Majority		1,738	24.56	
Turnout		7,100	77.49	
Democratic Coalition gain from NPP		Swing		
