= Yu Yan (constituency) =

Hong Kong constituency

- 愉欣
- Elected constituency for the Sha Tin District Council
- Boundary of Yu Yan in Sha Tin District
- District: Sha Tin
- Legislative Council constituency: New Territories South East
- Population: 18,617 (2019)
- Electorate: 10,862 (2019)

Current constituency
- Created: 2003
- Number of members: One
- Member: Vacant

Yu Yan
- Traditional Chinese: 愉欣
Transcriptions
Yue: Cantonese
- Yale Romanization: Yùh yān
- Jyutping: Jyu4 jan1

Yu Yan is one of the 36 constituencies of the Sha Tin District Council. The seat elects one member of the council every four years. The constituency has an estimated population of 18,197.

== Councillors represented ==
Election	Member	Party
2003	Yiu Ka-chun	Civil Force
2014	Yiu Ka-chun	NPP/CF
2019	Lo Yuet-chau→Vacant	STCV

== Election results ==
=== 2010s ===
Tai Po District Council Election, 2019: Yu Yan
Party	Candidate	Votes	%	±%
STCV (PfD)	Lo Yuet-chau	4,691	56.73	
Civil Force (NPP)	Yiu Ka-chun	3,578	43.26	
Majority		1,113	13.47	
Turnout		8,296	76.39	
STCV gain from Civil Force		Swing		
