= Hin Ka (constituency) =

Hong Kong constituency

- Elected constituency for the Sha Tin District Council
- Boundary of Hin Ka in Sha Tin District
- District: Sha Tin
- Legislative Council constituency: New Territories North East
- Population: 13,023 (2019)
- Electorate: 9,968 (2019)

Current constituency
- Created: 1994
- Number of members: One
- Member: Vacant

Hin Ka
- Traditional Chinese: 顯嘉
Transcriptions
Yue: Cantonese
- Yale Romanization: Hín gā
- Jyutping: Hin2 ga1

Hin Ka is one of the 36 constituencies of the Sha Tin District Council. The seat elects one member of the council every four years. The constituency has an estimated population of 13,023.

== Councillors represented ==
Election	Member	Party
1994	Mok Wai-hung	Independent
199?	Mok Wai-hung	Frontier
200?	Mok Wai-hung	Independent
2007	Nancy Lam Chung-yan	Civil Force
2014	Nancy Lam Chung-yan	NPP/CF
2019	Mozam Chan Wan-tung→Vacant	Nonpartisan

== Election results ==
=== 2010s ===
Sha Tin District Council Election, 2019: Hin Ka
Party	Candidate	Votes	%	±%
Nonpartisan	Mozam Chan Wan-tung	3,101	43.26	
Civil Force	Nancy Lam Chung-yan	2,547	35.53	
Ind. democrat	Tim Cheung Yu-tim	1,246	17.38	
Nonpartisan	Bonnie Tze Yuk-mui	203	2.83	
Nonpartisan	Luen Kwok-fai	72	1.00	
Majority		554	7.73	
Turnout		7,198	72.25	
Nonpartisan gain from Civil Force		Swing		
