= Sheung Shun (constituency) =

Hong Kong constituency

- Elected constituency for the Kwun Tong District Council
- Boundary of Sheung Shun in Kwun Tong District
- District: Kwun Tong
- Legislative Council constituency: Kowloon East
- Population: 17,620 (2019)
- Electorate: 10,759 (2019)

Current constituency
- Created: 1994
- Number of members: One
- Member: Fu Pik-chun (Independent)

Sheung Shun (Chinese: 雙順) is one of the 37 constituencies in the Kwun Tong District of Hong Kong which was created in 2007 and currently held by independent Fu Pik-chun.

The constituency loosely covers part of Shun Lee Estate, Shun Chi Court and Shun Lee Disciplined Services Quarters in Jordan Valley with the estimated population of 17,620.

== Councillors represented ==
Election	Member	Party
1994	Law Chun-ngai	Democratic
2007	Fu Pik-chun	Independent

== Election results ==
=== 2010s ===
Kwun Tong District Council Election, 2019: Sheung Shun
Party	Candidate	Votes	%	±%
Independent	Fu Pik-chun	4,200	51.50	
ADPL	Mark Leung Hon-hei	3,006	36.86	
Nonpartisan	Chan Cho-kwong	949	11.64	
Majority		1,194	14.64	
Turnout		8,167	75.94	
Independent hold		Swing		

Kwun Tong District Council Election, 2015: Sheung Shun
Party	Candidate	Votes	%	±%
Independent	Fu Pik-chun	Uncontested		
Independent hold		Swing		

Kwun Tong District Council Election, 2011: Sheung Shun
Party	Candidate	Votes	%	±%
Independent	Fu Pik-chun	Uncontested		
Independent hold		Swing		

=== 2000s ===
Kwun Tong District Council Election, 2007: Sheung Shun
Party	Candidate	Votes	%	±%
Independent	Fu Pik-chun	2,272	52.4	
Democratic	Law Chun-ngai	1,220	28.1	−29.4
Independent	Ling Kim-kong	847	19.5	
Majority		1,052	24.3	
Independent gain from Democratic		Swing		

Kwun Tong District Council Election, 2003: Sheung Shun
Party	Candidate	Votes	%	±%
Democratic	Law Chun-ngai	2,159	57.5	+0.3
DAB	Henry Lim	1,593	42.5	
Majority		566	15.0	
Democratic hold		Swing		

=== 1990s ===
Kwun Tong District Council Election, 1999: Sheung Shun
Party	Candidate	Votes	%	±%
Democratic	Law Chun-ngai	1,962	57.2	−0.8
Nonpartisan	Lau Hon-man	1,470	42.8	
Majority		492	14.4	
Democratic hold		Swing		

Kwun Tong District Board Election, 1994: Sheung Shun
Party	Candidate	Votes	%	±%
Democratic	Law Chun-ngai	1,538	58.0	
LDF	Chan Ka-yu	1,116	42.0	
Majority		422	16.0	
Democratic win (new seat)				
