= 2019 Sha Tin District Council election =

District council election in Sha Tin, Hong Kong

- 24 November 2019

41 (of the 42) seats to Sha Tin District Council 22 seats needed for a majority
- Turnout: 73.3% ▲25.4%
	First party	Second party	Third party
Party	Civic	Democratic	Community Sha Tin
Last election	0 seat, 2.1%	7 seats, 15.0%	New party
Seats before	2	3	4
Seats won	7	6	5
Seat change	▲5	▲3	▲1
Popular vote	29,914	30,444	25,509
Percentage	9.8%	9.9%	8.3%
Swing	▲7.7%	▼5.1%	N/A
	Fourth party	Fifth party	Sixth party
Party	DAB	STCV	Labour
Last election	7 seats, 18.0%	New party	1 seat, 1.5%
Seats before	7	0	1
Seats won	1	1	1
Seat change	▼6	▲1	Steady
Popular vote	46,759	4,691	4,665
Percentage	15.3%	1.5%	1.5%
Swing	▼2.7%	N/A	▼2.3%
	Seventh party	Eighth party	Ninth party
Party	Neo Democrats	LSD	NPP
Last election	5 seats, 8.5%	0 seat, 0.9%	8 seats, 17.1%
Seats before	0	0	7
Seats won	1	1	0
Seat change	▲1	▲1	▼7
Popular vote	3,869	3,283	36,732
Percentage	1.3%	1.1%	12.0%
Swing	▼7.2%	▲0.2%	▼5.1%
- Colours on map indicate winning party for each constituency.

The 2019 Sha Tin District Council election was held on 24 November 2019 to elect all 41 elected members to the 42-member Sha Tin District Council.

In the historic landslide victory in 2019, the pro-democrats took control of the council by sweeping 40 of the 41 elected seats. Only new constituency Di Yee was won by pro-Beijing DAB as two pro-democrat candidates split the votes which gave the DAB the victory.

== Overall election results ==
Before election:

↓
19	20
Pro-democracy	Pro-Beijing

Change in composition:

↓
40	2
Pro-democracy	PB

Sha Tin District Council election result 2019
Party	Seats	Gains	Losses	Net gain/loss	Seats %	Votes %	Votes	+/−
Independent	11	8	4	+4	26.8	32.0	98,085	
DAB	1	1	7	−6	2.4	15.3	46,759	−2.7
NPP	0	0	7	−7	0.0	12.0	36,732	−4.4
Democratic	6	0	3	+3	14.6	9.9	30,444	−5.1
Civic	7	5	0	+5	17.1	9.8	29,914	+7.7
Community Sha Tin	5	1	0	+1	12.2	8.3	25,509	
PfD	2	2	0	+2	4.9	2.4	7,315	
Civil Force	0	0	2	−2	0.0	2.3	7,164	
FTU	0	0	0	0	0.0	2.2	6,707	−0.5
STCV	1	1	0	+1	2.4	1.5	4,691	
Labour	1	0	0	0	2.4	1.5	4,665	−2.3
Neo Democrats	1	1	0	+1	2.4	1.3	3,869	−7.2
LSD	1	1	0	+1	2.4	1.1	3,283	+0.2
Liberal	0	0	0	0	0.0	0.4	1,211	
ASEA	0	0	0	0	0.0	0.0	54	
