= Mei Foo South (constituency) =

Constituency in Sham Shui Po district

- Elected constituency for the Sham Shui Po District Council
- Boundary of Mei Foo South in Sham Shui Po District
- District: Sham Shui Po
- Legislative Council constituency: Kowloon West
- Population: 16,563 (2019)
- Electorate: 9,400 (2019)

Current constituency
- Created: 2003
- Number of members: One
- Member: Vacant
- Created from: Mei Foo

Mei Foo South, formerly called Mei Foo, is one of the 25 constituencies in the Sham Shui Po District. The constituency returns one district councillor to the Sham Shui Po District Council, with an election every four years.

Mei Foo South constituency is loosely based on the southeastern area of the Mei Foo Sun Chuen and Manhattan Hill in Lai Chi Kok with estimated population of 16,563.

== Councillors represented ==
=== Mei Foo (1994–2003) ===
Election	Member	Party
1994	Joe Wong Tak-chuen	Democratic
1999	Tanny Tsang Yau-fat	DAB
2003 by-election	Joe Wong Tak-chuen	Democratic

=== Mei Foo South (2003 to present) ===
Election	Member	Party
2003	Joe Wong Tak-chuen	Democratic
2007	Joe Wong Tak-chuen	Democratic→Civic
2011	Wong Tat-tung	DAB
2015	Wong Tat-tung	DAB
2019	Chau Yuen-man→Vacant	Civic

== Election results ==
=== 2010s ===
Sham Shui Po District Council Election, 2019: Mei Foo South
Party	Candidate	Votes	%	±%
Civic	Chau Yuen-man	4,020	56.33	+8.93
DAB	Wong Tat-tung	3,117	43.67	−8.63
Majority		903	12.66	
Turnout		7,160	76.18	
Civic gain from DAB		Swing		

Sham Shui Po District Council Election, 2015: Mei Foo South
Party	Candidate	Votes	%	±%
DAB	Wong Tat-tung	2,421	52.3	+3.3
Civic	Joe Wong Tak-chuen	2,193	47.4	+0.3
Nonpartisan	Judy Tzeng Li-wen	179	3.9	
Majority		228	4.9	
Turnout		4,849	56.6	
DAB hold		Swing		

Sham Shui Po District Council Election, 2011: Mei Foo South
Party	Candidate	Votes	%	±%
DAB	Wong Tat-tung	1,987	49.0	
Civic	Joe Wong Tak-chuen	1,908	47.1	
Independent	Ken Chan Kin-chun	159	3.9	
DAB gain from Civic		Swing		

=== 2000s ===
Sham Shui Po District Council Election, 2007: Mei Foo South
Party	Candidate	Votes	%	±%
Democratic	Joe Wong Tak-chuen	1,493	50.1	−9.3
DAB	Wallace Yeung Hon-sing	1,487	49.9	+9.3
Democratic hold		Swing		

Sham Shui Po District Council Election, 2003: Mei Foo South
Party	Candidate	Votes	%	±%
Democratic	Joe Wong Tak-chuen	1,936	59.4	+16.1
DAB	Yeung Yiu-chung	1,324	40.6	−3.2
Democratic hold		Swing		

Mei Foo By-election 2003
Party	Candidate	Votes	%	±%
Democratic	Joe Wong Tak-chuen	849	43.8	−5.1
DAB	Yeung Yiu-chung	840	43.3	−7.1
ADPL	Se Kwok-hung	244	12.6	
Democratic gain from DAB		Swing		

=== 1990s ===
Sham Shui Po District Council Election, 1999: Mei Foo
Party	Candidate	Votes	%	±%
DAB	Tanny Tsang Yau-fat	1,048	50.4	
Democratic	Joe Wong Tak-chuen	1,017	48.9	−1.5
DAB gain from Democratic		Swing		

Sham Shui Po District Board Election, 1994: Mei Foo
Party	Candidate	Votes	%	±%
Democratic	Joe Wong Tak-chuen	1,072	50.4	
Liberal	Cheng Ching-kay	912	42.8	
Public Affairs Society	Song Wai-kun	129	6.1	
Democratic win (new seat)				
