= Bik Woo (constituency) =

Hong Kong constituency

- Elected constituency for the Sha Tin District Council
- Boundary of Bik Woo in Sha Tin District
- District: Sha Tin
- Legislative Council constituency: New Territories North East
- Population: 16,609 (2019)
- Electorate: 9,914 (2019)

Current constituency
- Created: 1994
- Number of members: One
- Member: Vacant

Bik Woo
- Traditional Chinese: 碧湖
Transcriptions
Yue: Cantonese
- Yale Romanization: Bīk wùh
- Jyutping: Bik1 wu4

Bik Woo is one of the 41 constituencies of the Sha Tin District Council. The seat elects one member of the council every four years. The constituency has an estimated population of 16,609.

== Councillors represented ==
Election	Member	Party
1994	Shirley Ho Suk-ping	Democratic
1999	Peter Leung Kwok-hin	Progressive Alliance
2003	Lau Wai-lun	Democratic
200?	Lau Wai-lun	Nonpartisan
201?	Lau Wai-lun	BPA
2015	Wong Ping-fan	DAB
2019	Luk Tsz-tung→Vacant	Civic→Independent

== Election results ==
=== 2010s ===
Sha Tin District Council Election, 2019: Bik Woo
Party	Candidate	Votes	%	±%
Civic	Luk Tsz-tung	4,280	55.32	
DAB	Wong Ping-fan	3,457	44.68	
Majority		823	10.64	
Turnout		7,779	78.47	
Civic gain from DAB		Swing		
