= 2015 Sha Tin District Council election =

Hong Kong local election

- 22 November 2015

38 (of the 39) seats to Sha Tin District Council 20 seats needed for a majority
- Turnout: 47.9%
	First party	Second party	Third party
Party	NPP/CF	DAB	Democratic
Last election	12 seats, 21.5%	9 seats, 24.0%	5 seats, 19.2%
Seats before	13	8	4
Seats won	8	7	7
Seat change	▼5	▼1	▲3
Popular vote	26,572	27,899	23,311
Percentage	17.1%	18.0%	15.0%
Swing	▼4.4%	▼6.0%	▼4.2%
	Fourth party	Fifth party	Sixth party
Party	Neo Democrats	Labour	Sha Tin Community Network
Last election	2 seats, 6.3%	New party	New party
Seats before	1	0	0
Seats won	5	1	1
Seat change	▲4	▲1	▲1
Popular vote	13,188	5,887	3,718
Percentage	8.5%	3.8%	2.4%
Swing	▲2.2%	N/A	N/A
- Colours on map indicate winning party for each constituency.

The 2015 Sha Tin District Council election was held on 22 November 2015 to elect all 38 elected members to the 39-member Sha Tin District Council.

The pan-democrats and the pro-Beijing camp both won 19 seats but the pro-Beijing camp was still able to control the council with 1 ex officio member.

== Overall election results ==
Before election:

↓
8	28
Pro-democracy	Pro-Beijing

Change in composition:

↓
19	19
Pro-democracy	Pro-Beijing

Sha Tin District Council election result 2015
Party	Seats	Gains	Losses	Net gain/loss	Seats %	Votes %	Votes	+/−
Independent	7	2	2	0	18.4	21.8	33,980	
DAB	7	0	1	–1	15.8	18.0	28,023	–6.0
NPP/CF	8	0	5	−5	21.1	17.1	26,572	−4.4
Democratic	7	3	0	+3	18.4	15.0	23,311	+4.2
Neo Democrats	5	4	0	+4	13.2	8.5	13,188	+2.2
Labour	1	+1	0	+1	2.6	3.8	5,887	
FTU	0	0	0	0	0	2.7	4,194	+1.6
PfD	1	0	0	0	2.6	2.5	3,938	
Sha Tin Community Network	1	1	0	+1	2.6	2.4	3,718	
Civic	0	0	0	0	0	2.1	3,234	–1.9
People Power	0	0	0	0	0	1.0	1,602	–0.4
LSD	0	0	0	0	0	0.9	1,406	+0.5
BPA	0	0	0	0	0	0.3	541	
