= 2011 Sha Tin District Council election =

Hong Kong local election

- 6 November 2011

36 (of the 43) seats to Sha Tin District Council 22 seats needed for a majority
- Turnout: 41.0%
	First party	Second party	Third party
Party	Civil Force	DAB	Democratic
Last election	15 seats, 22.4%	8 seats, 21.3%	3 seats, 12.9%
Seats before	15	8	2
Seats won	12	9	5
Seat change	▼3	▲2	▲3
Popular vote	24,969	27,899	22,261
Percentage	21.5%	24.0%	19.2%
Swing	▼0.9%	▲2.7%	▲6.3%
	Fourth party	Fifth party
Party	Neo Democrats	Liberal
Last election	New party	1 seat, 4.4%
Seats before	1	1
Seats won	2	1
Seat change	Steady	Steady
Popular vote	7,261	Uncontested
Percentage	6.3%	N/A
Swing	N/A	N/A
- Colours on map indicate winning party for each constituency.

The 2011 Sha Tin District Council election was held on 6 November 2011 to elect all 36 elected members to the 43-member District Council.

== Overall election results ==
Before election:

↓
6	30
Pro-dem	Pro-Beijing

Change in composition:

↓
9	27
Pro-dem	Pro-Beijing

Sha Tin District Council election result 2011
Party	Seats	Gains	Losses	Net gain/loss	Seats %	Votes %	Votes	+/−
DAB	9	2	0	+2	25.0	24.0	27,899	+2.7
Civil Force	12	1	4	−3	33.3	21.5	24,969	−0.9
Democratic	5	3	0	+3	13.9	19.2	22,261	+6.3
Independent	6	0	2	–2	16.7	16.2	19,056	
Neo Democrats	2	1	1	0	5.6	6.3	7,261	
Civic	0	0	0	0	0	4.0	4,620	+0.7
People Power	0	0	0	0	0	1.4	1,677	
FTU	0	0	0	0	0	1.1	1,309	
Citizens' Radio	0	0	0	0	0	0.4	522	
