= 2003 Sha Tin District Council election =

Hong Kong local election

- 23 November 2003

36 (of the 46) seats to Sha Tin District Council 24 seats needed for a majority
- Turnout: 44.5%
	First party	Second party	Third party
Party	Civil Force	Democratic	DAB
Last election	11 seats, 24.2%	3 seats, 15.0%	9 seats, 20.7%
Seats before	11	3	9
Seats won	14	7	2
Seat change	▲3	▲4	▼7
Popular vote	15,708	15,692	19,708
Percentage	16.6%	16.6%	20.9%
Swing	▼7.6%	▲1.6%	▲0.2%
	Fourth party	Fifth party	Sixth party
Party	Frontier	HKPA	Liberal
Last election	3 seats, 10.1%	3 seats, 7.0%	1 seat, 2.3%
Seats before	2	1	1
Seats won	2	1	1
Seat change	Steady	▼2	Steady
Popular vote	6,641	3,051	1,956
Percentage	7.0%	3.2%	2.1%
Swing	▼3.1%	▼3.8%	▼0.2%
	Seventh party
Party	CTU
Last election	Did not contest
Seats before	0
Seats won	1
Seat change	▲1
Popular vote	1,280
Percentage	1.4%
Swing	N/A
- Colours on map indicate winning party for each constituency.

The 2003 Sha Tin District Council election was held on 23 November 2003 to elect all 36 elected members to the 46-member District Council.

== Overall election results ==
Before election:

↓
8	28
Pro-democracy	Pro-Beijing

Change in composition:

↓
14	22
Pro-democracy	Pro-Beijing

Sha Tin District Council election result 2003
Party	Seats	Gains	Losses	Net gain/loss	Seats %	Votes %	Votes	+/−
Civil Force	14	4	1	+3	38.9	16.6	15,708	−7.6
Independent	8	3	2	+1	22.2	29.9	28,228	
DAB	2	0	7	−7	5.6	20.9	19,708	+0.2
Democratic	7	4	0	+4	19.4	16.6	15,692	+1.6
Frontier	2	1	1	0	5.6	7.0	6,641	−3.1
HKPA	1	0	2	−2	2.8	3.2	3,051	−3.8
7.1 People Pile	0	0	0	0	0	2.3	2,181	
Liberal	1	0	0	0	2.8	2.1	1,956	−0.2
CTU	1	1	0	+1	2.8	1.4	1,280	
