= Kam To (constituency) =

Hong Kong constituency

- Elected constituency for the Sha Tin District Council
- Boundary of Kam To in Sha Tin District
- District: Sha Tin
- Legislative Council constituency: New Territories South East
- Population: 19,781 (2019)
- Electorate: 13,405 (2019)

Current constituency
- Created: 2003
- Number of members: One
- Member: Vacant
- Created from: Heng To, Kam Fung

Kam To is one of the 36 constituencies of the Sha Tin District Council. The seat elects one member of the council every four years. It was first created in 2003.

== Councillors represented ==
Election	Member	Party
2003	Shirley Ho Suk-ping	Democratic
2007	Gary Yeung Man-yui	DAB
2015	James Chan Kwok-keung	Nonpartisan
2019	Hui Lap-san→Vacant	Independent democrat

== Election results ==
=== 2010s ===
Sha Tin Council Election, 2019: Kam To
Party	Candidate	Votes	%	±%
Ind. democrat	Hui Lap-san	3,929	39.61	
DAB	Ng Kai-tai	3,867	38.99	−9.61
Nonpartisan	Mio Chan Tin-chun	2,023	20.40	
Nonpartisan	Ng Chi-hung	100	1.01	
Majority		62	0.62	
Turnout		9,954	74.26	
Ind. democrat gain from Nonpartisan		Swing		

Sha Tin Council Election, 2015: Kam To
Party	Candidate	Votes	%	±%
Nonpartisan	James Chan Kwok-keung	2,592	51.4	
DAB	Gary Yeung Man-yui	2,455	48.6	–1.0
Majority		137	2.8	–8.2
Turnout		5,186	43.4	
Nonpartisan hold		Swing		

Sha Tin Council Election, 2011: Kam To
Party	Candidate	Votes	%	±%
DAB	Gary Yeung Man-yui	2,104	50.6	−14.0
Democratic	Donna Yau Yuet-wah	1,730	41.6	
Independent	Tony Tam Hin-chung	323	7.8	
Majority		374	8.99	−20.2
DAB hold		Swing	−20.2	

=== 2000s ===
Sha Tin Council Election, 2007: Kam To
Party	Candidate	Votes	%	±%
DAB	Gary Yeung Man-yui	2,030	55.2	
Democratic	Shirley Ho Suk-ping	1,680	44.8	−10.5
Majority		382	10.4	+18.6
DAB gain from Democratic		Swing	+18.6	

Sha Tin Council Election, 2003: Kam To
Party	Candidate	Votes	%	±%
Democratic	Shirley Ho Suk-ping	2,163	35.4	
DAB (Civil Force)	Lau Kong-wah	1,885	24.9	
Majority		278	10.5	(new)
Democratic win (new seat)				
