= 1999 Sha Tin District Council election =

Hong Kong local election

- 28 November 1999

36 (of the 46) seats to Sha Tin District Council 24 seats needed for a majority
- Turnout: 36.8%
	First party	Second party	Third party
Party	Civil Force	DAB	Democratic
Last election	10 seats, 18.3%	0 seat, 2.4%	8 seats, 20.8%
Seats before	9	4	7
Seats won	11	9	3
Seat change	▲2	▲5	▼4
Popular vote	19,633	16,830	12,190
Percentage	24.2%	20.7%	15.0%
Swing	▲5.9%	▲18.3%	▲5.8%
	Fourth party	Fifth party	Sixth party
Party	Frontier	HKPA	Liberal
Last election	New party	Did not contest	2 seats, 15.7%
Seats before	2	3	0
Seats won	3	3	1
Seat change	▲1	Steady	▲1
Popular vote	8,215	5,696	1,870
Percentage	10.1%	7.0%	2.3%
Swing	N/A	N/A	▼13.4%
- Colours on map indicate winning party for each constituency.

The 1999 Sha Tin District Council election was held on 28 November 1999 to elect all 36 elected members to the 46-member District Council.

== Overall election results ==
Before election:

↓
10	21
Pro-democracy	Pro-Beijing

Change in composition:

↓
8	28
Pro-democracy	Pro-Beijing

Sha Tin District Council election result 1999
Party	Seats	Gains	Losses	Net gain/loss	Seats %	Votes %	Votes	+/−
Civil Force	11	3	1	+2	30.6	24.2	19,633	+5.9
Independent	6	3	3	0	22.2	20.7	16,847	
DAB	9	5	0	+5	25.0	28.7	16,830	+18.3
Democratic	3	1	5	−4	8.3	15.0	12,190	+5.8
Frontier	3	1	0	+1	8.3	10.1	8,215	
HKPA	3	2	2	0	8.3	7.0	5,696	
Liberal	1	1	0	+1	2.8	2.3	1,870	−13.4
