= Di Yee (constituency) =

Constituency of Sha Tin District, Hong Kong

- Elected constituency for the Sha Tin District Council
- Boundary of Di Yee in Sha Tin District
- District: Sha Tin
- Legislative Council constituency: New Territories North East
- Population: 16,877 (2019)
- Electorate: 5,736 (2019)

Current constituency
- Created: 2019
- Number of members: One
- Member: Lam Kong-kwan (DAB)
- Created from: Bik Woo, Kwong Hong

Di Yee (Chinese: 帝怡) is one of the 41 constituencies in the Sha Tin District.

Created for the 2019 District Council elections, the constituency returns one district councillor to the Sha Tin District Council, with an election every four years.

Di Yee loosely covers residential flats in Castello, Greenhill Villa and Shek Mun Estate Phase 2 in Shek Mun. It has projected population of 16,877.

== Councillors represented ==
Election	Member	Party
2019	Roy Lam Kong-kwan	DAB

== Election results ==
=== 2010s ===
Sha Tin District Council Election, 2019: Di Yee
Party	Candidate	Votes	%	±%
DAB	Roy Lam Kong-kwan	1,923	43.52	
Community Sha Tin	Hilary Tse Kit-wing	1,666	37.70	
Democratic	Liu Qing	830	18.78	
Majority		257	5.82	
Turnout		4,429	77.23	
DAB win (new seat)				
