= 2007 Sai Kung District Council election =

Hong Kong local election

- 18 November 2007

23 (of the 30) seats to Sai Kung District Council 16 seats needed for a majority
- Turnout: 39.1%
	First party	Second party
Party	DAB	Democratic
Last election	4 seats, 13.2%	4 seats, 21.2%
Seats before	8	4
Seats won	9	4
Seat change	▲1	Steady
Popular vote	14,061	10,361
Percentage	24.5%	18.1%
Swing	▲11.3%	▼3.1%
	Third party	Fourth party
Party	Civil Force	Frontier
Last election	3 seats, 17.3%	Did not run
Seats before	2	1
Seats won	3	1
Seat change	▲1	Steady
Popular vote	6,160	1,130
Percentage	10.7%	2.0%
Swing	▼6.6%	N/A
- Colours on map indicate winning party for each constituency.

The 2007 Sai Kung District Council election was held on 18 November 2007 to elect all 23 elected members to the 30-member District Council.

== Overall election results ==
Before election:

↓
8	12
Pro-democracy	Pro-Beijing

Change in composition:

↓
8	15
Pro-democracy	Pro-Beijing

Sai Kung District Council election result 2007
Party	Seats	Gains	Losses	Net gain/loss	Seats %	Votes %	Votes	+/−
Independent	6	1	0	+1	26.1	34.8	19,942	
DAB	9	1	0	+1	39.1	24.5	14,061	+11.3
Democratic	4	1	1	0	17.4	18.1	10,361	−3.3
Civil Force	3	1	0	+1	12.5	10.7	6,160	−6.6
Liberal	0	0	0	0	0	5.3	3,035	−3.1
Civic	0	0	0	0	0	2.4	1,397	
Frontier	1	0	0	0	4.3	2.0	1,130	
LSD	0	0	0	0	0	2.1	1,224	
