= 2007 Sha Tin District Council election =

Hong Kong local election

- 18 November 2007

36 (of the 46) seats to Sha Tin District Council 24 seats needed for a majority
- Turnout: 39.3%
	First party	Second party	Third party
Party	Civil Force	DAB	Democratic
Last election	14 seats, 16.6%	2 seats, 17.6%	7 seats, 16.6%
Seats before	13	4	7
Seats won	15	8	3
Seat change	▲2	▲4	▼4
Popular vote	24,969	15,708	14,246
Percentage	22.4%	21.3%	12.9%
Swing	▲5.8%	▲3.7%	▼3.7%
	Fourth party	Fifth party
Party	Frontier	Liberal
Last election	2 seats, 7.0%	1 seat, 2.1%
Seats before	1	2
Seats won	1	1
Seat change	Steady	▼1
Popular vote	11,663	4,873
Percentage	10.6%	4.4%
Swing	▲3.6%	▲2.3%
- Colours on map indicate winning party for each constituency.

The 2007 Sha Tin District Council election was held on 18 November 2007 to elect all 36 elected members to the 46-member District Council.

== Overall election results ==
Before election:

↓
11	1	24
Pro-democracy	V	Pro-Beijing

Change in composition:

↓
5	31
Pro-dem	Pro-Beijing

Sha Tin District Council election result 2007
Party	Seats	Gains	Losses	Net gain/loss	Seats %	Votes %	Votes	+/−
Civil Force	15	2	0	+2	41.7	22.4	24,969	+5.8
Independent	8	1	2	−1	22.2	22.3	24,633	
DAB	8	5	1	+4	22.2	21.3	15,708	+3.7
Democratic	3	1	5	−4	13.9	12.9	14,246	−3.7
Frontier	0	0	0	0	0	10.6	11,663	
Liberal	1	0	1	−1	2.8	4.4	4,873	+2.3
Civic	0	0	0	0	0	3.3	3,677	
LSD	0	0	0	0	0	1.6	1,753	
CTU	0	0	0	0	0	1.3	1,426	
