= 2003 Sai Kung District Council election =

Hong Kong local election

- 23 November 2003

20 (of the 27) seats to Sai Kung District Council 14 seats needed for a majority
- Turnout: 47.0%
	First party	Second party
Party	Democratic	DAB
Last election	3 seats, 13.7%	5 seats, 17.0%
Seats before	3	5
Seats won	4	4
Seat change	▲1	▼1
Popular vote	12,262	7,662
Percentage	21.2%	13.2%
Swing	▲7.5%	▼3.8%
	Third party	Fourth party
Party	HKPA	Civil Force
Last election	3 seats, 16.4%	Did not contest
Seats before	4	3
Seats won	4	3
Seat change	Steady	Steady
Popular vote	6,861	10,012
Percentage	11.8%	17.3%
Swing	▼4.6%	N/A
- Colours on map indicate winning party for each constituency.

The 2003 Sai Kung District Council election was held on 23 November 2003 to elect all 20 elected members to the 27-member District Council.

== Overall election results ==
Before election:

↓
4	13
Pro-dem	Pro-Beijing

Change in composition:

↓
8	12
Pro-democracy	Pro-Beijing

Sai Kung District Council election result 2003
Party	Seats	Gains	Losses	Net gain/loss	Seats %	Votes %	Votes	+/−
Independent	5	4	0	4	29.4	34.8	17,582	
Democratic	4	1	0	+1	23.5	21.2	12,262	+7.5
Civil Force	3	0	0	0	12.5	17.3	10,012	
DAB	4	0	1	−1	23.5	24.5	7,662	−3.8
HKPA	4	0	0	0	23.5	11.8	6,861	
ADPL	0	0	0	0	0	2.5	1,480	
Liberal	0	0	0	0	0	6.8	1,246	
New Forum	0	0	0	0	0	1.4	833	
