= 7.1 People Pile =

Hong Kong political organisation

- Traditional Chinese: 七一人民批
Transcriptions
Yue: Cantonese
- Yale Romanization: Chāt yāt yàhn màhn pāi
- Jyutping: Cat1 jat1 jan4 man4 pai1

7.1 People Pile was a loose pro-democracy political group in Hong Kong named after the mass protest on 1 July 2003. It was established on 10 August 2003. The group is formed by a group of young people mainly under their 30s. Its aim is to push ahead for democracy in Hong Kong by continuing the spirit of "people's power" in the 1 July protests.

Their platform includes a call for universal suffrage for the Chief Executive in 2007 and Legislative Council in 2008, opposing legislation to implement Article 23 of the Basic Law, Hong Kong's mini-constitution, and demanding the Chief Executive, Tung Chee-hwa, to step down. The platform of the group also included the fight for full-fledged democracy, minority rights such as LGBT rights, gender equality, and the development of civil society.

The group filed three candidates in the 2003 District Council elections. All of them were defeated.
