= Democratic Coalition for DC Election =

Democratic Coalition for DC Election 民主派區選聯盟
- Logo for the 2019 District Council election
- Abbreviation: Democratic Coalition
- Founded: July 4, 2007
- Ideology: Liberalism (HK)
- Political position: Big tent
- Regional affiliation: Pro-democracy camp
- District Councils: 0 / 470

Democratic Coalition for DC Election
- Traditional Chinese: 民主派區選聯盟
- Literal meaning: Pro-democracy Camp's District Elections Coalition
Transcriptions

Alternative Chinese name
- Traditional Chinese: 泛民區選聯盟
- Literal meaning: Pan-democrat's District Elections Coalition
Transcriptions

The Democratic Coalition for DC Election (Chinese: 民主派區選聯盟, formerly 泛民區選聯盟) is an electoral co-ordination mechanism run by pro-democratic parties to avoid clashes between allies in the District Council elections.

== History ==
It was first created for the 2007 District Council election by pan-democracy parties including the Power for Democracy, the Civic Party, the League of Social Democrats (LSD), the Democratic Party, the Hong Kong Association for Democracy and People's Livelihood (ADPL), the Social Democratic Front, the Frontier, the Network for Women in Politics, the Neighbourhood and Workers Service Centre (NWSC) and the Hong Kong Confederation of Trade Unions (HKCTU).

The coalition aimed at filling only one pan-democratic candidate in each constituency and successfully decreased clashes in more than 30 constituencies to only 10. The coalition eventually filled 296 candidates in which 108 of them were elected.

In the 2011 District Council election, the coalition supported 236 pan-democratic candidates in which 88 of them were elected.

In the 2015 District Council election, the coalition supported 213 pan-democratic candidates. Many new pro-democracy groups were formed by young people after the Occupy movement and some of them coordinated with the coalition. However, six of them refused to do so and ran against the Democratic Party in areas where the party has had a close fight with the pro-Beijing camp in previous elections.

In the 2019 District Council election, the coalition endorsed 397 pro-democratic candidates, including eight incumbent Legislative Councillors, 147 non-affiliated fresh faces, despite there were more than 30 constituencies where there were more than one pro-democrat candidate.

== Electoral performance ==
=== District Council elections ===
| Election | Number of popular votes | % of popular votes | Total elected seats | +/− |
|---|---|---|---|---|
| 2007 | 409,573 | 35.97 | 108 / 405 | 0 |
| 2011 | 369,461▼ | 31.29▼ | 88 / 412 | 9▼ |
| 2015 | 451,765▲ | 31.25▼ | 105 / 431 | 21▲ |
| 2019 | 1,428,687▲ | 48.73▲ | 347 / 452 | 242▲ |
