= New Youth Forum =

New Youth Forum (Chinese: 新青年論壇) is a political party in the Hong Kong Special Administrative Region of the People's Republic of China. The youth group was established in October 2001, and is currently led by convenor Regina Yeung Sum-yu.

The basic platform of the group is to promote youth participation in political and social affairs, to serve the community, and to focus on the rights of the youth.

The convenor of the group, Regina Yeung, attempted to run for a seat in the 2003 District Council elections but failed. She ran under the banner of the New Century Forum during the 2000 Legislation Council elections before the establishment of the group.

Leader: Tang Wing-chun (鄧咏駿) Vice leader: Chan Hoi-yan (陳凱茵), Szeto Ngai-man (司徒毅敏)
