= 1999 Islands District Council election =

Hong Kong local election

- 28 November 1999
- Turnout: 47.8%
Party	Democratic Alliance for the Betterment and Progress of Hong Kong
Popular vote	1,331
Percentage	15.4%
- Colours on map indicate winning party for each constituency.

The 1999 Islands District Council election was held on 28 November 1999 to elect all 7 elected members to the 19-member District Council.

== Overall election results ==
Before election:

↓
6
Pro-Beijing

Change in composition:

↓
1	6
Pro-dem	Pro-Beijing

Islands District Council election result 1999
Party	Seats	Gains	Losses	Net gain/loss	Seats %	Votes %	Votes	+/−
Independent	5	2	1	+1	71.4	69.3	6,003	
DAB	2	1	1	0	28.6	15.4	1,331	+9.0
Democratic	0	0	0	0	0	13.8	1,195	−4.9
Liberal	0	0	0	0	0	1.6	134	
