= 2007 Hong Kong local elections =

- 18 November 2007

All Elected Constituencies 405 (of the 534) seats in all 18 Districts Councils
- Registered: 3,295,826 ▲10.84%
- Turnout: 1,148,815 (38.83%) ▼5.27pp
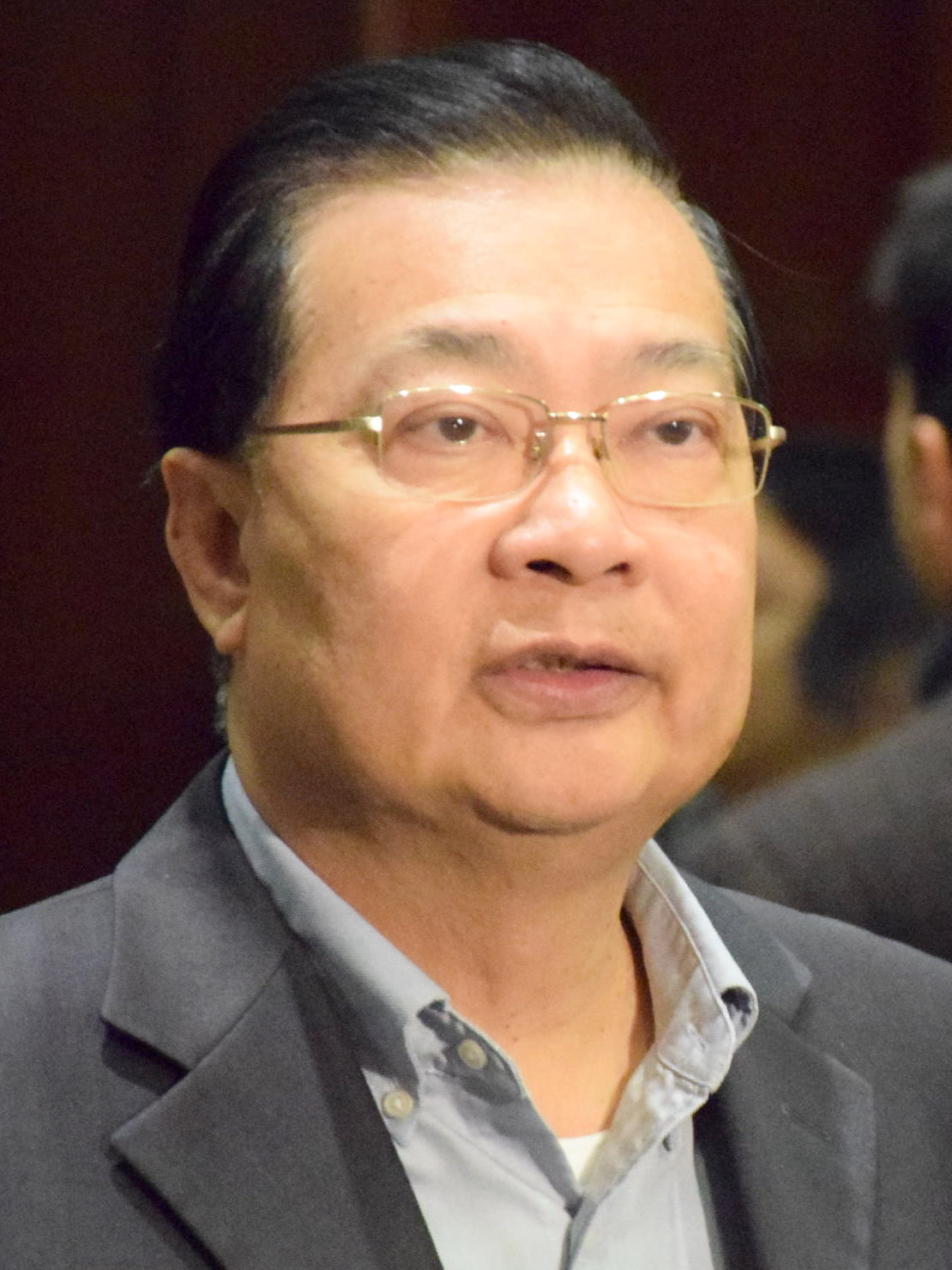

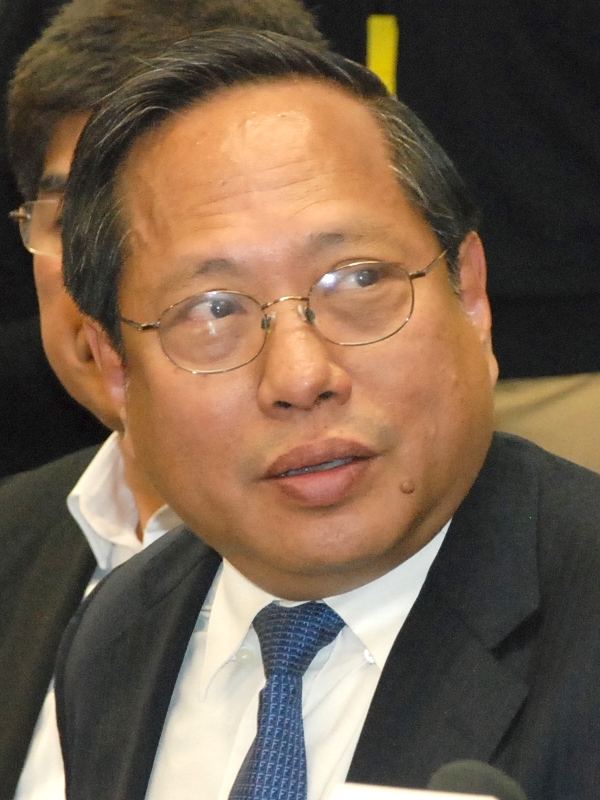

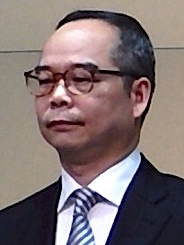

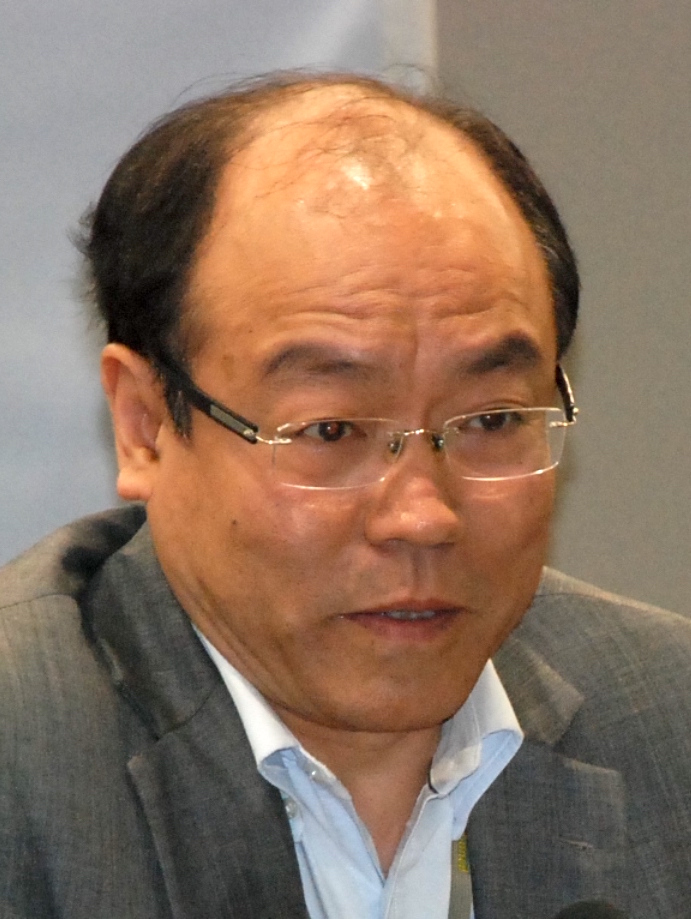

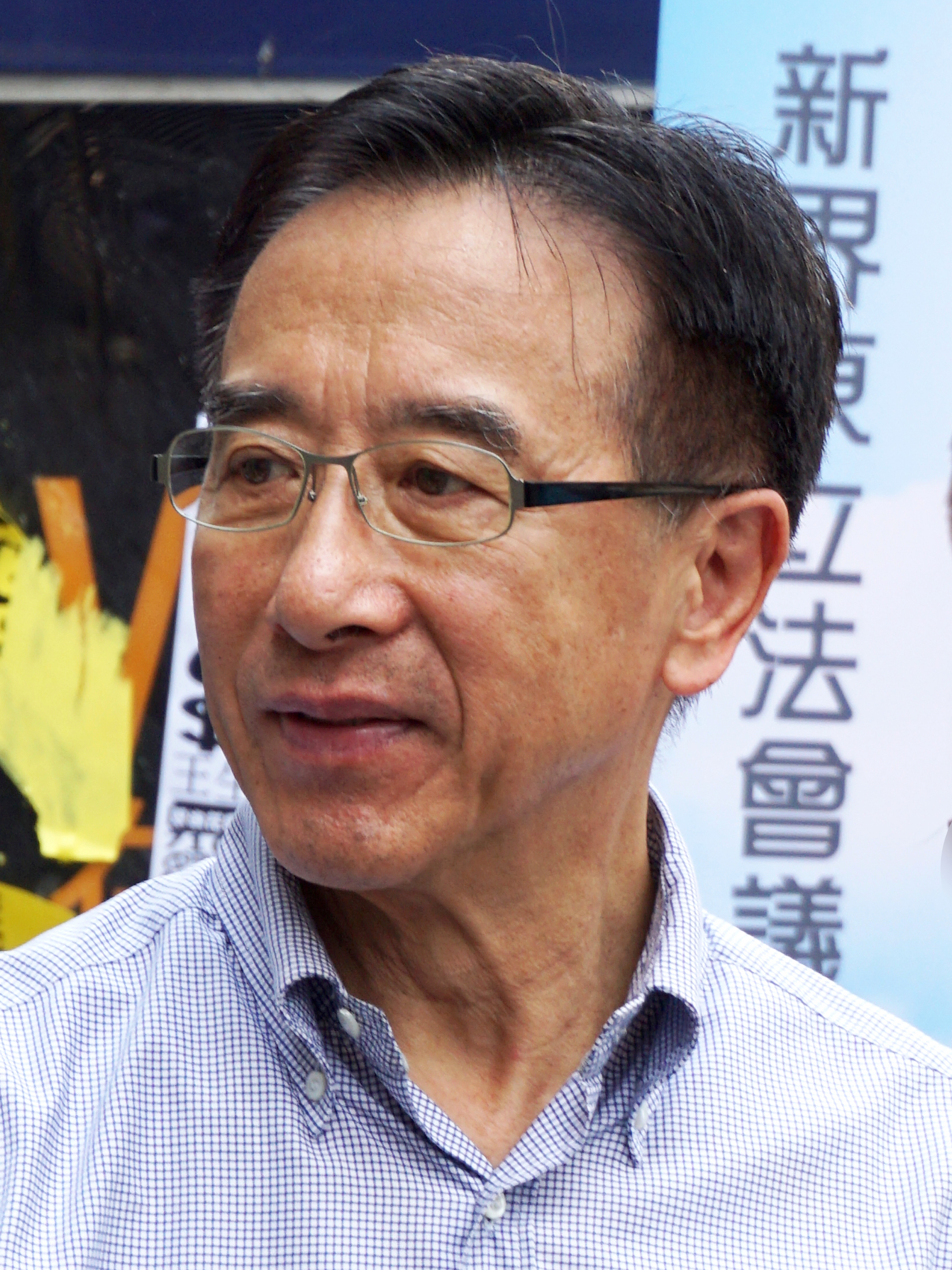

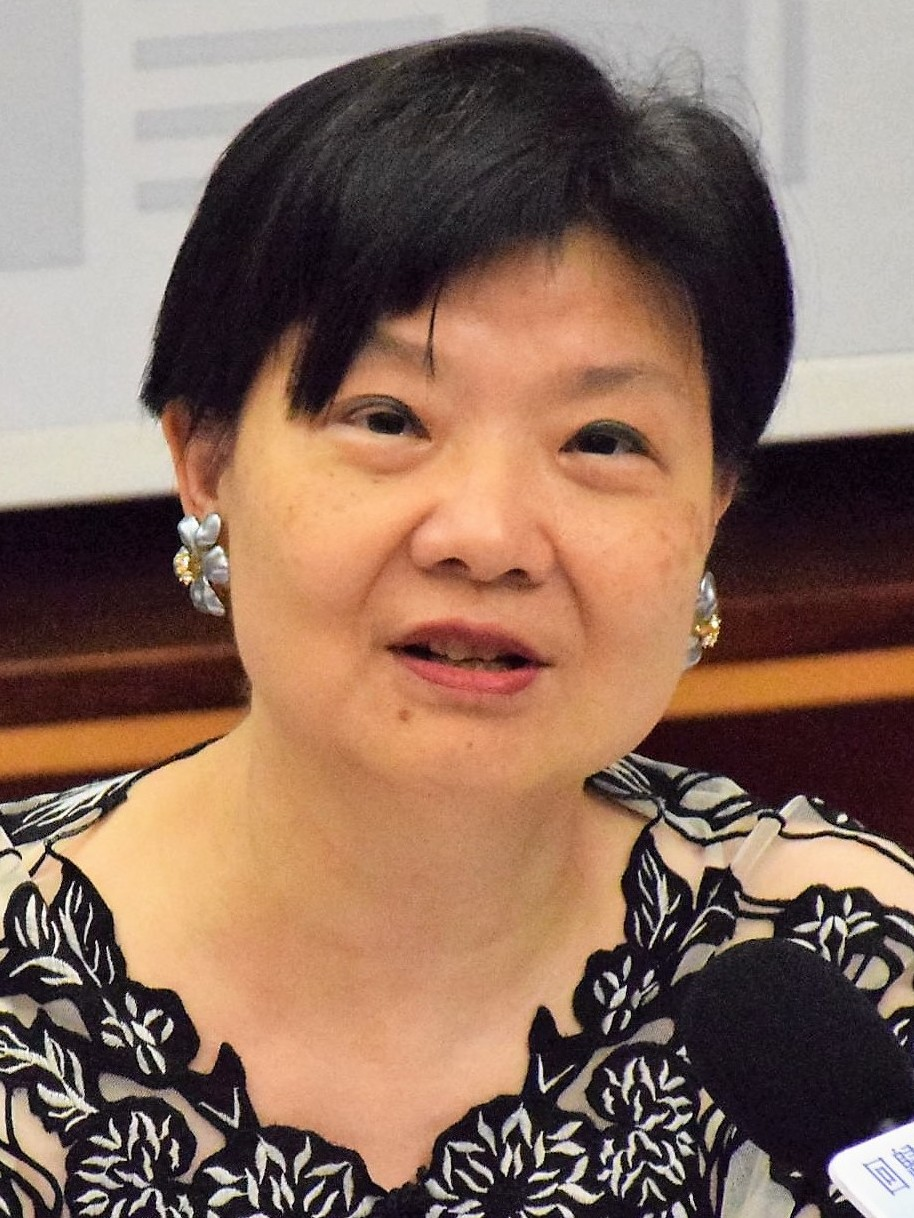

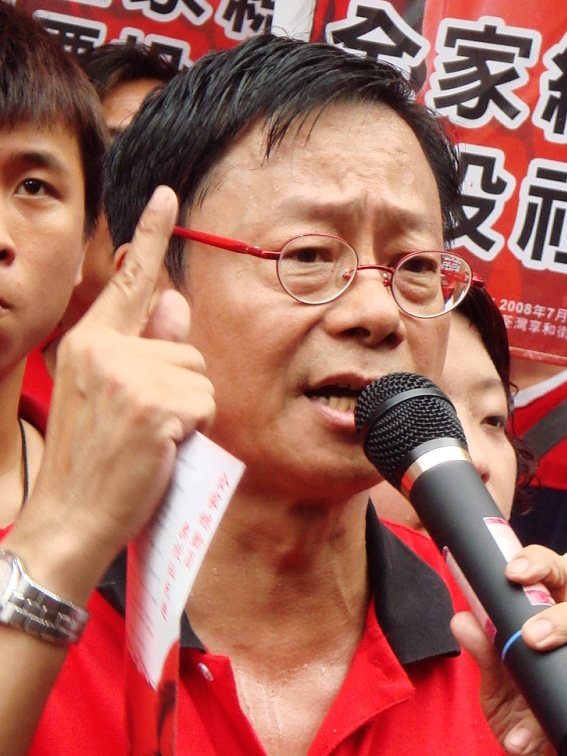

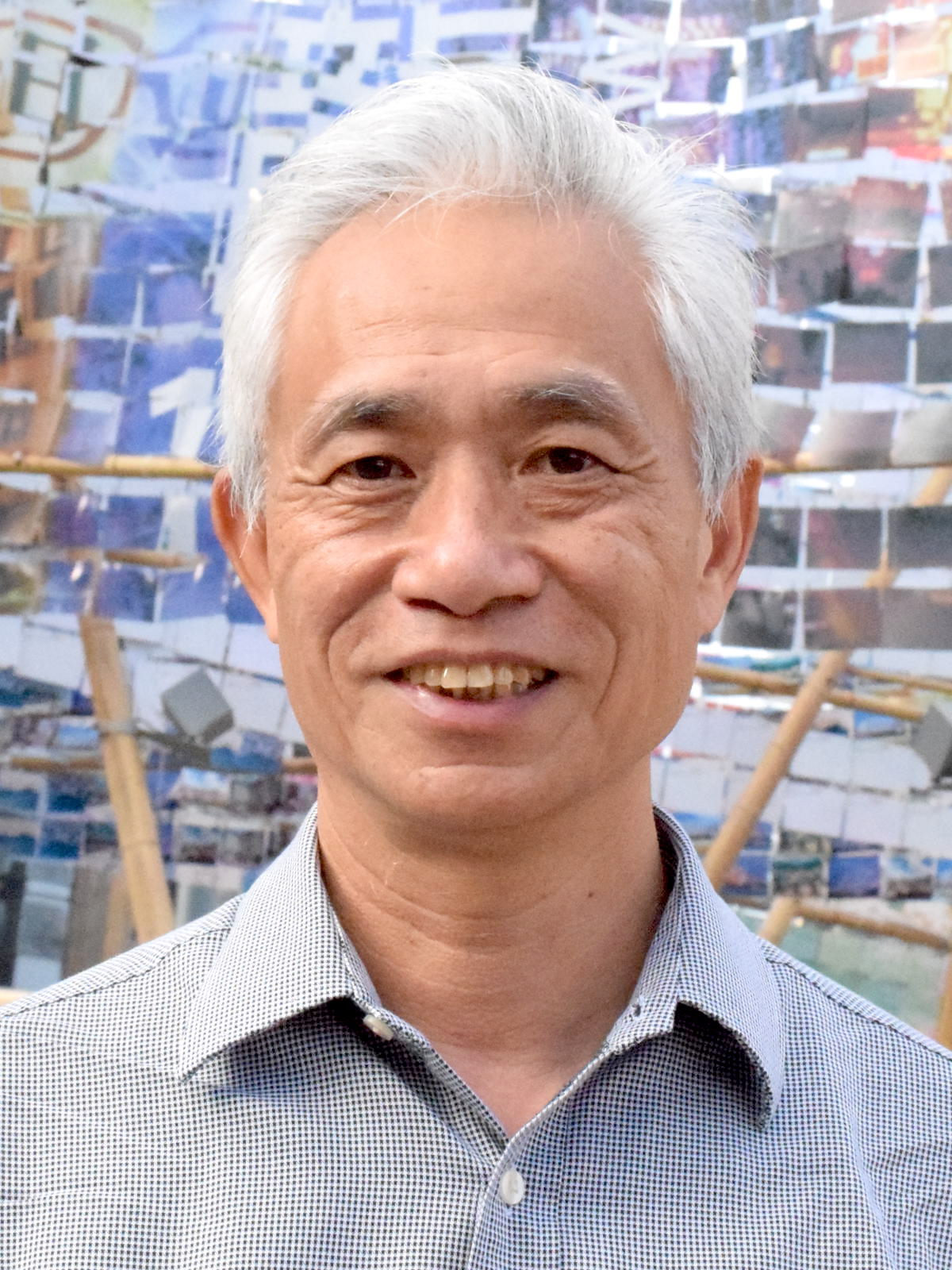

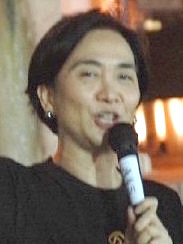
	First party	Second party	Third party
Leader	Tam Yiu-chung	Albert Ho	Lau Kong-wah
Party	DAB	Democratic	Civil Force
Alliance	Pro-Beijing	Pan-democracy	Pro-Beijing
Last election	62 seats, 22.94%	95 seats, 21.27%	17 seats, 2.45%
Seats won	115	59	18
Seat change	▲40	▼21	▲3
Popular vote	292,916	175,054	30,880
Percentage	25.73%	15.38%	2.71%
Swing	▲2.79pp	▼5.90pp	▲0.26pp
	Fourth party	Fifth party	Sixth party
Leader	Frederick Fung	James Tien	Audrey Eu
Party	ADPL	Liberal	Civic
Alliance	Pan-democracy	Pro-Beijing	Pan-democracy
Last election	25 seats, 5.07%	14 seats, 2.77%	New party
Seats won	17	14	8
Seat change	▼7	▼3	▲2
Popular vote	52,386	50,026	48,837
Percentage	4.60%	4.39%	4.29%
Swing	▼0.46pp	▲1.63pp	N/A
	Seventh party	Eighth party	Ninth party
Leader	Wong Yuk-man	Leung Yiu-chung	Emily Lau
Party	LSD	NWSC	Frontier
Alliance	Pan-democracy	Pan-democracy	Pan-democracy
Last election	New party	4 seats, 1.35%	6 seats, 2.41%
Seats won	6	4	3
Seat change	Steady	Steady	▼3
Popular vote	28,601	12,565	18,203
Percentage	2.51%	1.10%	1.60%
Swing	N/A	▼0.24pp	▼0.81pp
- Map of the winning party by constituency

The 2007 Hong Kong District Council elections were held on 18 November 2007. Elections were held to all 18 districts of Hong Kong, returned 405 members from directly elected constituencies out of total 534 councils member. A total number of 886 candidates contesting in 364 seats, while 41 seats were uncontested. A total number of 1.4 million voters cast their ballots, 38% of the electorate, significantly lower than the last elections in 2003.

The pro-Beijing flagship party Democratic Alliance for the Betterment and Progress of Hong Kong (DAB) received the largest victory in its history, rebounding their loss from the 2003 with extra gain, taking total number of 115 seats, compared to 62 seats in the 2003 elections. The pan-democrats suffered a devastating loss, with its electoral coalition winning only about a hundred seats out of almost 300 candidates. The pro-democracy flagship party Democratic Party was beaten in every region especially in Kowloon, losing almost half of the seats as compared to the 2003 elections.

As a result, the pan-democrats lost control of their two traditional strongholds, Sham Shui Po and Kwai Tsing with the help of the pro-government members appointed by Chief Executive Donald Tsang to the District Councils.

== Contesting parties ==
=== Parties ===
In September 2007, the pan-democrats announced their plan to field 289 candidates in the election, including 138 incumbents and 136 newcomers after a process of coordination initiated by the Power for Democracy under the banner of Democratic Coalition for DC Election. After the coordination, the number constituencies with more than one pro-democratic candidates reduced from 30 to 7. The pan-democrats demanded universal suffrage and abolition of the appointed seat in the District Councils as the election platform.

The Democratic Party, the flagship pro-democratic party fielded 114 candidates, Civic Party 41, Hong Kong Association for Democracy and People's Livelihood (ADPL) 38, League of Social Democrats 28, The Frontier 15, as well as Democratic Alliance, Civic Act-up, Hong Kong Confederation of Trade Unions (CTU), Neighbourhood and Worker's Service Centre (NWSC) and the others.

The Civic Party, derived from the Article 45 Concern Group established after the 2003 July 1 protests was a relatively new party without much resources and district network with only 7 incumbent district councillors. The party fielded around 42 candidates in constituencies where the pan-democrats had not contested with its new image to appeal to the voters. Another new founded League of Social Democrats fielded about 30 candidates in lower-income areas such as Wong Tai Sin, Kwun Tong and Tsuen Wan, seeking to appeal to the lower class voters.

The thinktank Savantas Policy Institute set up by former Secretary for Security Regina Ip also fielded four candidates with independent affiliation in the election, including two retired civil servant and a former administrative officer.

=== Candidates ===
A historic record of 917 nominations were received since the handover of Hong Kong. 39 of the 405 seats received only one nomination thus were returned uncontestedly, of which 12 of them were taken by the Democratic Alliance for the Betterment and Progress of Hong Kong (DAB), 2 by Liberal Party and 1 by the Democratic Party.

Cyd Ho, the incumbent district councillor who beat DAB's Ip Kwok-him in his own constituency Kwun Lung in 2003, did not seek for re-election. Ip faced challenged by activist Ho Loy. Two Civic Party rising stars, barrister Tanya Chan and Tsang Kwok-fung challenged incumbent Peak district councillor Lam Man-kit of the Liberal Party and DAB legislator Li Kwok-ying in Tai Po Market. Priscilla Leung, a pro-Beijing assistant professor of law at the City University of Hong Kong also ran in the election, challenging Democrat Chan Ka-wai in Whampoa East.

== Pre-election events ==
On 15 November, two days before the election, Ko Keung-wah, a village representative of Shung Ching San Tsuen in Yuen Long and an assistant to the Liberal Party candidate Philip Wong Pak-yan in Shap Pat Heung North and Lam Tim-fook in Shap Pat Heung South, was attacked. Ko got a finger on his right hand was chopped off and suffered at least four deep slice wounds to his back and one to his abdomen. Anti-triad officers said the attack might be linked with the election. On the election day, a triad member was spotted campaigning for an independent candidate in Shap Pat Heung North influential rural leader Leung Fuk-yuen.

== Results ==
Summary of the 18 November 2007 district councils of Hong Kong election results
Political Affiliation	Popular vote	%	%±	Standing	Elected	±
Democratic Alliance for the Betterment and Progress of Hong Kong	292,916	25.73	▲2.79	178 (Note: Candidates ran under both DAB and FTU banners were all counted as DAB in this chart.)	115	▲40
Civil Force	30,880	2.71	▲0.27	20	18	▲3
Liberal Party	50,026	4.39	▲1.63	55	14	▼3
Hong Kong Federation of Trade Unions	4,208	0.37	▲0.11	3	1	▲1
Tseung Kwan O Residents' Association	1,922	0.17	-	1	1	-
Tin Shui Wai Women Association	1,457	0.13	-	1	1	-
Federation of Hong Kong and Kowloon Labour Unions	1,339	0.12	▲0.12	1	1	0
New Territories General Chamber of Commerce	818	0.07	-	1	0	-
New Century Forum	543	0.05	▼0.03	1	0	0
Hong Kong Civic Association	390	0.03	-	5	0	-
Independents	226,645	19.91	-	161	118	
Total for pro-Beijing camp	614,621	53.98	▲7.38	430	273	▲61
Democratic Party	175,054	15.38	▼5.90	110	59	▼21
Hong Kong Association for Democracy and People's Livelihood	52,386	4.60	▼0.46	37	17	▼7
Civic Party	48,837	4.29	-	41	8	▲2
League of Social Democrats	28,601	2.51	-	29	6	0
Neighbourhood and Worker's Service Centre	12,565	1.10	▼0.24	5	4	0
Frontier	18,203	1.60	▼0.81	15	3	▼3
Yuen Long Tin Shui Wai Democratic Alliance	9,530	0.84	▲0.04	11	1	▼4
Hong Kong Confederation of Trade Unions	2,273	0.20	▼0.18	2	0	▼2
Civic Act-up	991	0.09	▼0.40	2	0	▼2
Individuals	60,510	5.31	-	44	10	-
Total for Democratic Coalition for DC Election	409,573	35.97	-	296	108	-
Independent democrats and others	36,208	3.18	-	39	19	-
Total for pan-democracy camp	445,781	39.15	▼5.51	335	127	▼56
Independent and others	78,133	6.86	▼2.21	142	5	-
Total (turnout 38.83%)	1,138,358	100.0	-	907	405 (Note: The total seats of the district councils are 534 including 27 ex-officio members (rural committee chairmen in the New Territories), and 102 members appointed members by the Chief Executive of Hong Kong.)	▲5

=== Results by district ===
Council	Previous control	Previous party	Post-election control	Largest party	DAB	DP	CF	ADPL	Lib	Civ	LSD	Others	Pro-dem	Pro-Beijing	Appointed & ex officio	Composition	Details
Central & Western	Pro-Beijing	Democratic	Pro-Beijing	Democratic	3	6			1	1		4	7	8	4		Details
Wan Chai	NOC	Civic Act-up	Pro-Beijing	DAB	2						1	8	4	7	3		Details
Eastern	Pro-Beijing	DAB	Pro-Beijing	DAB	14	3			2	2	2	14	10	26	9		Details
Southern	Pro-Beijing	Democratic	Pro-Beijing	Democratic	1	3			1			12	3	14	4		Details
Yau Tsim Mong	Pro-Beijing	Democratic	Pro-Beijing	DAB	7	1						8	3	13	4		Details
Sham Shui Po	Pro-democracy	ADPL	NOC	ADPL	3	2		10				6	13	8	5		Details
Kowloon City	Pro-Beijing	DAB	Pro-Beijing	DAB	6	2		3	2	1		8	6	16	5		Details
Wong Tai Sin	Pro-Beijing	DAB	Pro-Beijing	DAB	8	3		2	1		2	9	11	14	6		Details
Kwun Tong	Pro-Beijing	Democratic	Pro-Beijing	DAB	9	3						22	8	25	8		Details
Tsuen Wan	Pro-Beijing	Democratic	Pro-Beijing	DAB	3	3			1	2	1	7	8	9	5+2		Details
Tuen Mun	Pro-Beijing	DAB	Pro-Beijing	DAB	11	7		2	1			18	9	20	7+1		Details
Yuen Long	Pro-Beijing	DAB	Pro-Beijing	DAB	7	2			3			16	4	25	7+6		Details
North	Pro-Beijing	Democratic	Pro-Beijing	DAB	9	4						3	5	11	5+4		Details
Tai Po	Pro-Beijing	Democratic	Pro-Beijing	DAB	7	4						8	4	15	5+2		Details
Sai Kung	Pro-Beijing	DAB	Pro-Beijing	DAB	9	4	3					7	8	15	5+2		Details
Sha Tin	Pro-Beijing	Civil Force	Pro-Beijing	Civil Force	8	3	15		1			9	5	31	9+1		Details
Kwai Tsing	Pro-democracy	Democratic	Pro-Beijing	Democratic	4	9			1			14	17	11	7+1		Details
Islands	Pro-Beijing	DAB	Pro-Beijing	DAB	4						2	4	2	8	4+8		Details
TOTAL					115	59	18	17	14	8	6	176	129	276	129		

=== Vote summary ===
Votes, of total, by camp
1. Pro-Beijing (54.0%)
2. Pan-democrats (39.1%)
3. Other (6.87%)
Seats, of total, by camp
1. Pro-Beijing (67.4%)
2. Pan-democrats (31.4%)
3. Other (1.23%)

Popular vote
DAB	25.73%
Democratic	15.78%
ADPL	4.60%
Liberal	4.39%
Civic	4.29%
Civil Force	2.71%
LSD	2.51%
Frontier	1.60%
NCF	1.29%
NWSC	1.10%
Others	36.00%

=== Seat summary ===
Seats
DAB	28.40%
Democratic	14.57%
Civil Force	4.44%
ADPL	4.20%
Liberal	3.46%
Civic	1.98%
LSD	1.48%
NCF	1.48%
NWSC	0.99%
Frontier	0.74%
Others	39.26%

=== Overview ===
Without a major political issue like the last election in 2003, the voter turnout significantly dropped about six percentage point to only about 38%, although a total of 1.4 million voters cast their ballots, 80,000 more than the last elections. A total number of 886 candidates contesting in 364 seats, while 41 seats were without contest.

The Democratic Alliance for the Betterment and Progress of Hong Kong (DAB) received the largest victory in its history by winning 115 seats, nearly double than the 2003 results. The party vice-chairman Ip Kwok-him who lost to Cyd Ho in 2003 in his Kwun Lung constituency retook his seat by large margin. Kenny Lee Kwun-yee received a large number of votes in Tai Fat Hau, defeating pro-democratic candidate Ivy Chan Siu-ping of the Civic Act-up. Incumbent legislators Choy So-yuk, Li Kwok-ying and Wong Yung-kan all retained their seats in Kam Ping, Tai Po Market and Po Nga respectively.

The pan-democrats suffered a devastating defeat in the election. The Democratic Party was beaten in every region especially in Kowloon, losing almost half of the seats as compared to the 2003 elections. Veteran Chan Ka-wai in Whampoa East was ousted by Priscilla Leung, a pro-Beijing law scholar at the City University of Hong Kong backed by the Hong Kong Federation of Trade Unions (FTU). In Sheung Shun, incumbent Law Chun-ngai was defeated by Fu Pik-chun of the DAB by 1,220 votes. Former Democratic Party secretary Cheung Yin-tung also lost his seat in Wang King to DAB newcomer Yiu Kwok-wai by 1,321 to 1,684 votes.

The Civic Party failed to challenge the pro-Beijing candidates, winning only 8 seats out of 41 candidates. The party's rising star Yu Kwun-wai lost in a large margin to DAB's Bernard Chan in Ping Shek, while Civic legislator Mandy Tam lost her seat to Choi Luk-sing in Lung Sing. The Hong Kong Association for Democracy and People's Livelihood (ADPL) who had stronghold in Sham Shui Po also saw its candidate Leung Kam-tao lost his seat in Yau Yat Tsuen to pro-Beijing independent Jimmy Kwok Chun-wah. Richard Tsoi of the Hong Kong Confederation of Trade Unions (CTU) who took the seat in Fo Tan in 2003 failed to retain his seat, being beaten by Scarlet Pong Oi-lan of the New Century Forum.

== Aftermath ==
In December 2007, Chief Executive Donald Tsang named 102 government-appointed Council members, of which all of them had pro-government background and one-fifth of them were members of the Democratic Alliance for the Betterment and Progress of Hong Kong (DAB) and the Liberal Party. 15 of them were appointed for the third time. Tsang was criticised for not appointing a single member of the pan-democrats.
