= 2003 Hong Kong local elections =

- 23 November 2003

All Elected Constituencies 400 (of the 529) seats in all 18 Districts Councils
- Registered: 2,973,612 ▲4.98%
- Turnout: 1,066,373 (44.10%) ▲8.28pp
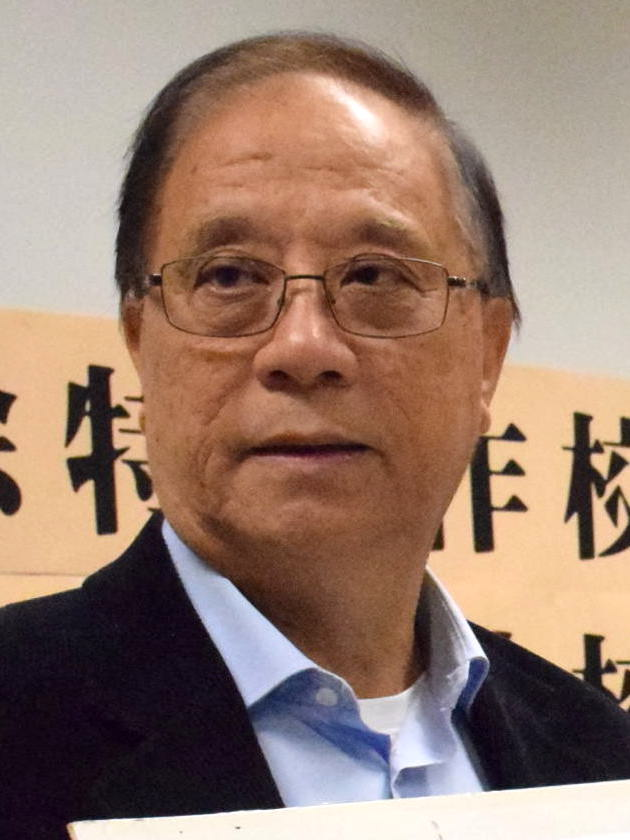

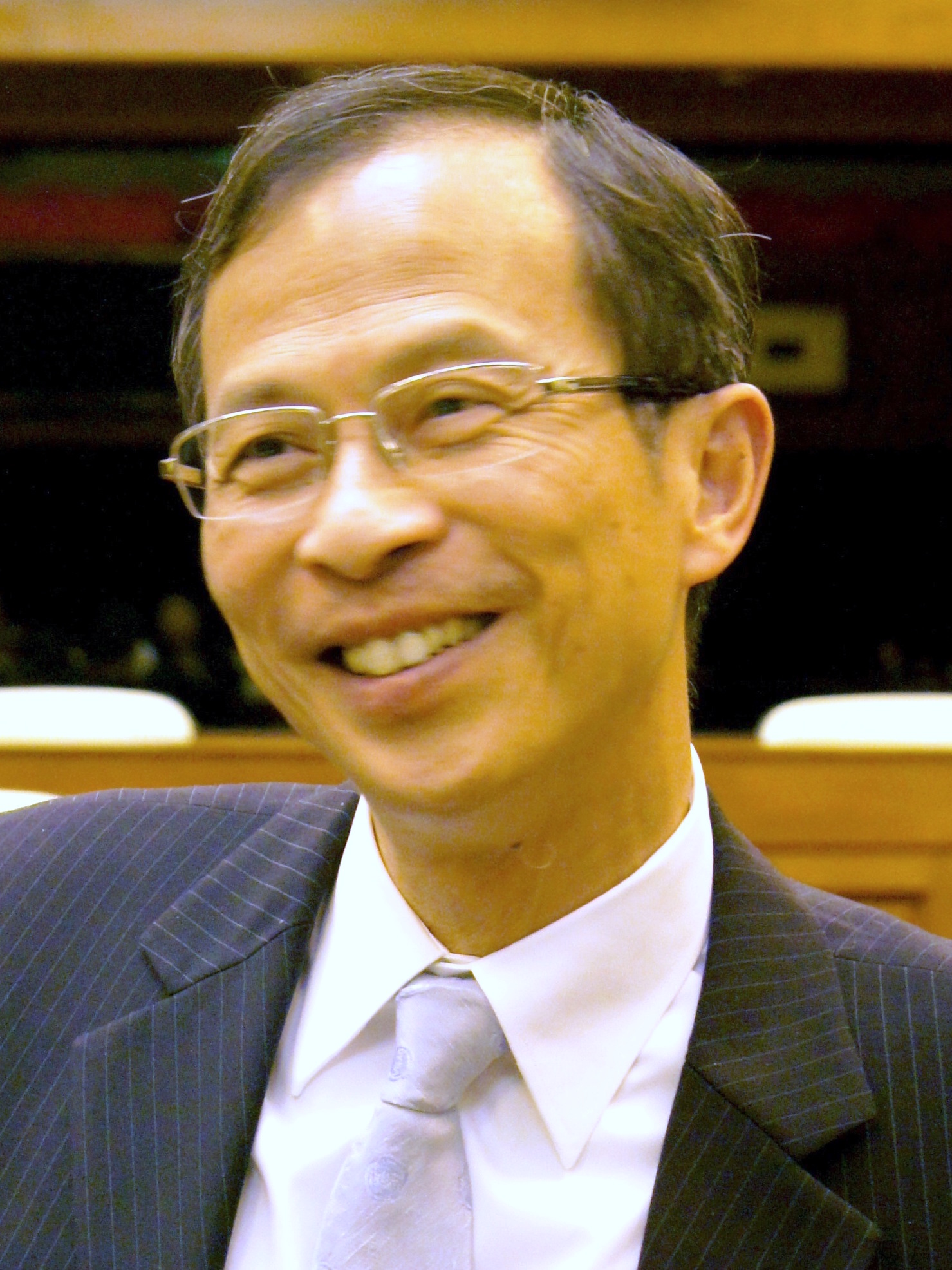

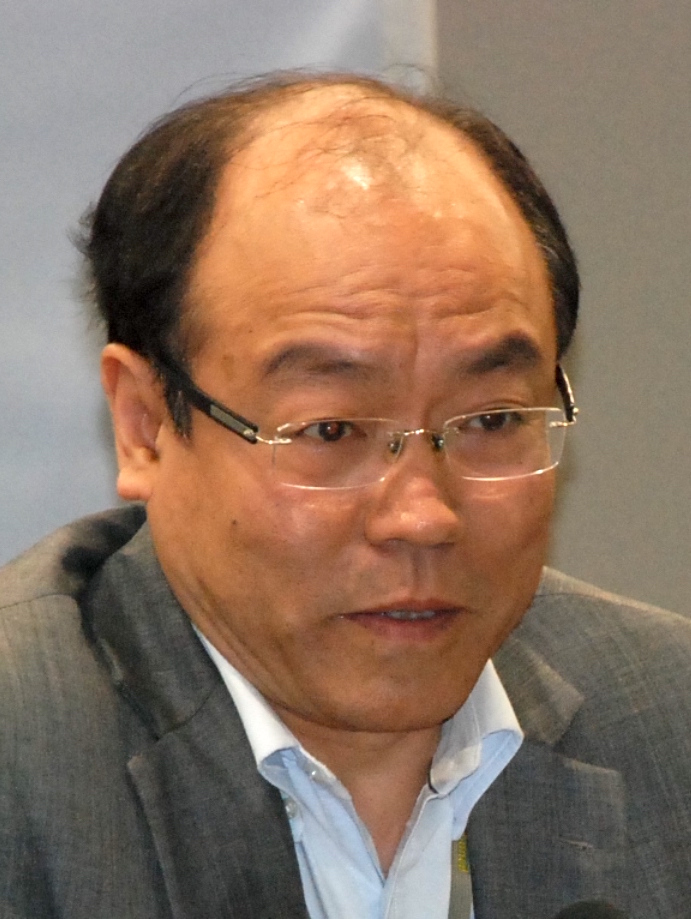

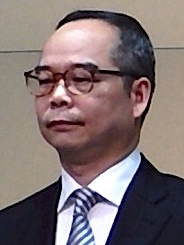

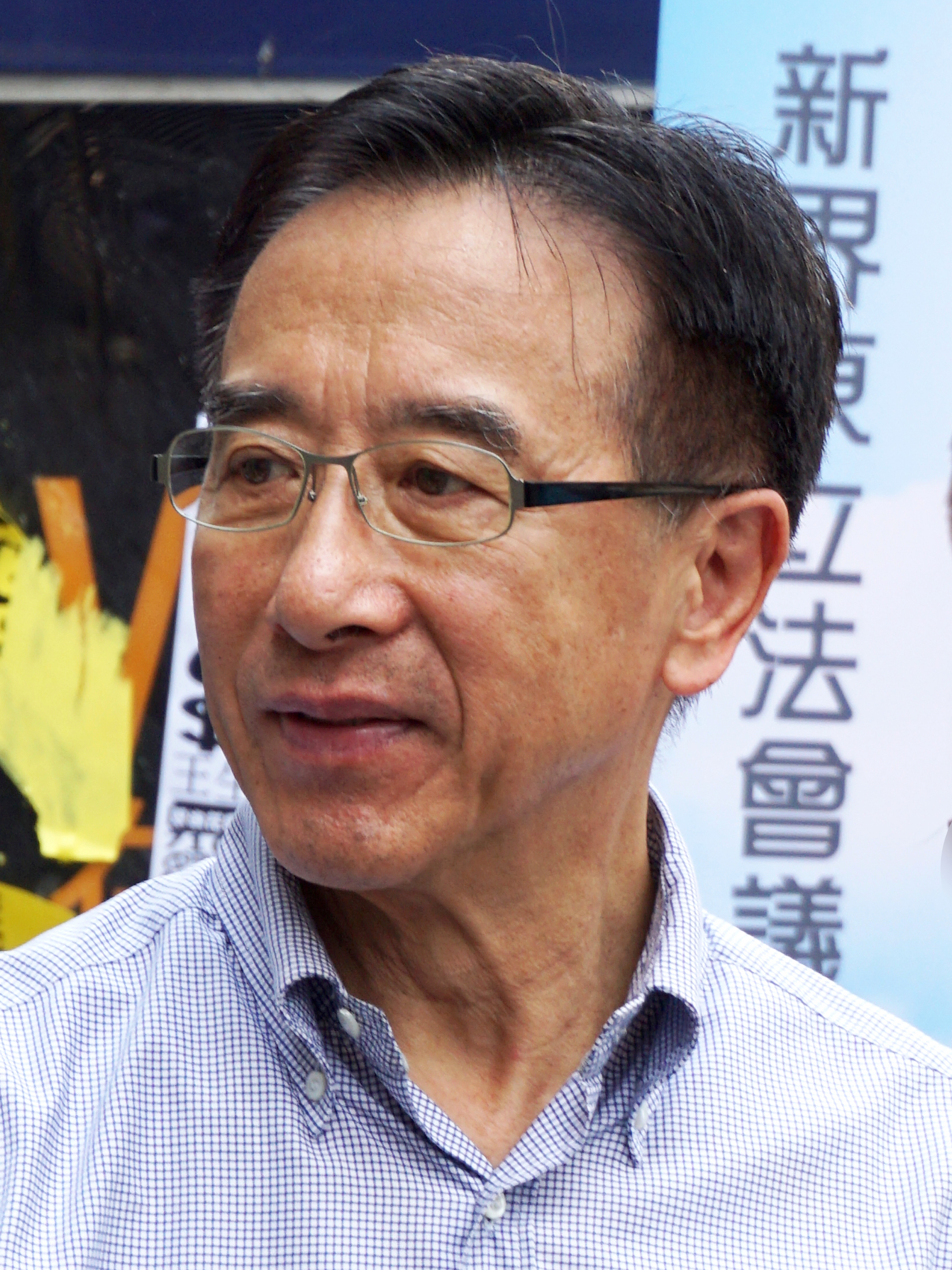

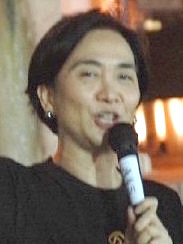

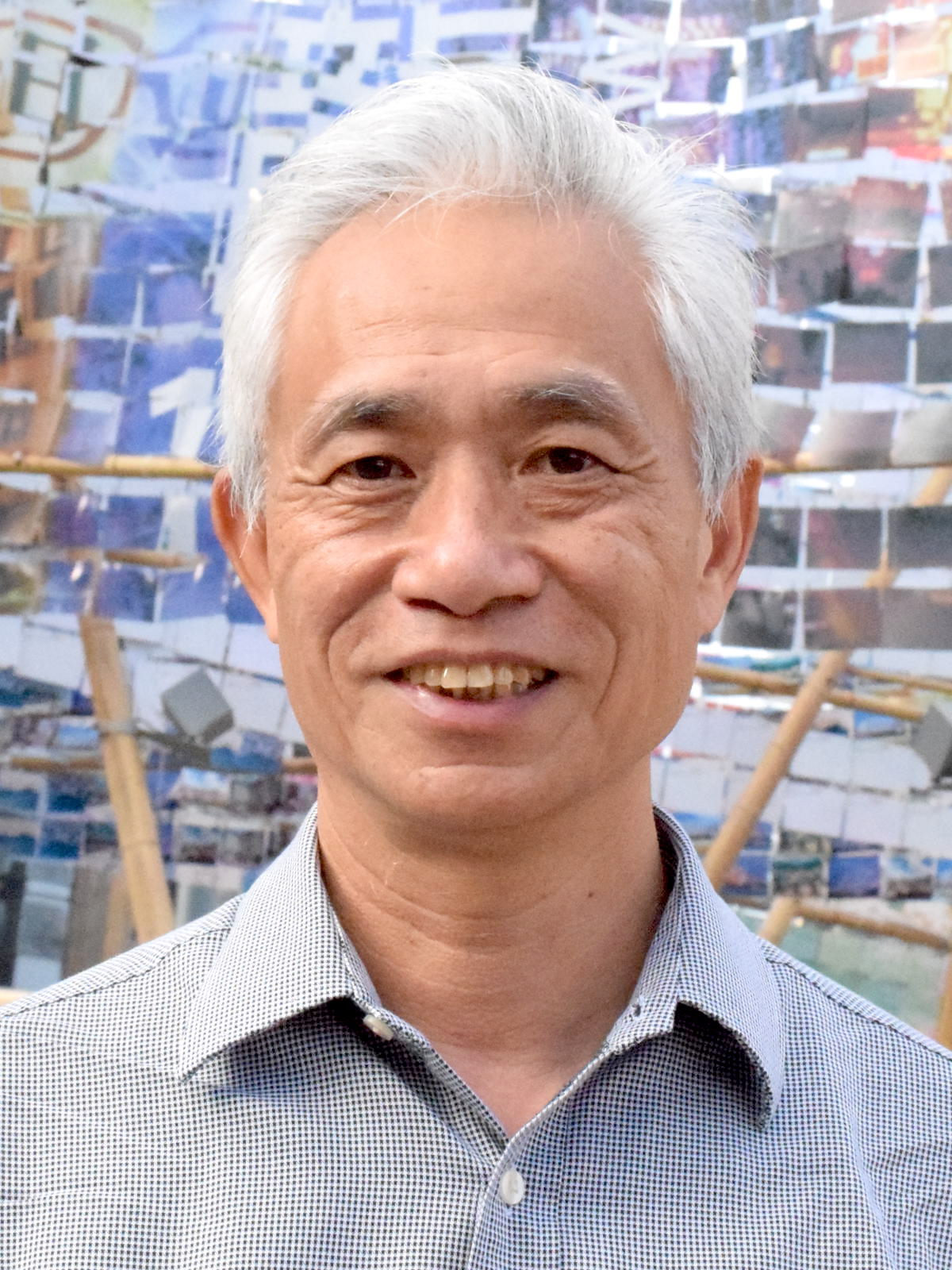

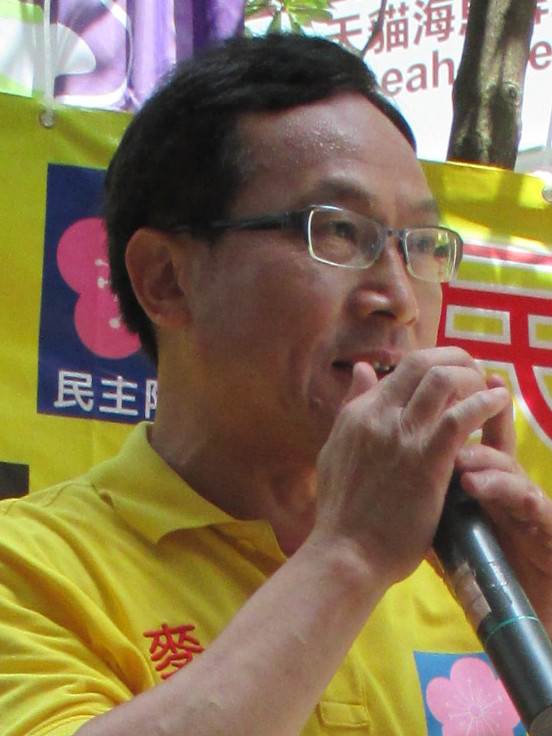
	First party	Second party	Third party
Leader	Yeung Sum	Tsang Yok-sing	Frederick Fung
Party	Democratic	DAB	ADPL
Alliance	Pro-democracy	Pro-Beijing	Pro-democracy
Last election	86 seats, 24.85%	81 seats, 23.53%	19 seats, 4.70%
Seats won	95	62	25
Seat change	▲17	▼21	▲4
Popular vote	223,675	241,202	53,264
Percentage	21.27%	22.94%	5.07%
Swing	▼3.57pp	▼0.59pp	▲0.36pp
	Fourth party	Fifth party	Sixth party
Leader	Lau Kong-wah	James Tien	Ambrose Lau
Party	Civil Force	Liberal	HKPA
Alliance	Pro-Beijing	Pro-Beijing	Pro-Beijing
Last election	11 seats, 2.42%	15 seats, 3.42%	16 seats, 2.65%
Seats won	17	14	13
Seat change	▲3	▲1	▼5
Popular vote	25,720	29,108	29,091
Percentage	2.45%	2.77%	2.77%
Swing	▲0.02pp	▼0.65pp	▼0.12pp
	Seventh party	Eighth party	Ninth party
Leader	Emily Lau	Leung Yiu-chung	Johnny Mak
Party	Frontier	NWSC	Democratic Alliance
Alliance	Pro-democracy	Pro-democracy	Pro-democracy
Last election	4 seats, 1.16%	2 seats, 0.41%	New party
Seats won	6	4	4
Seat change	▲1	▲1	▲2
Popular vote	25,349	14,146	8,418
Percentage	2.41%	1.35%	0.80%
Swing	▲1.25pp	▲0.94pp	N/A
- Map of the winning party by constituency

The 2003 Hong Kong District Council elections were held on 23 November 2003 for all 18 districts of Hong Kong, 400 members from directly elected constituencies out of total 529 council members. It was the second District Council election after the handover of Hong Kong in 1997.

The election was historically significant as it was the first election came after the controversies over the legislation of the Hong Kong Basic Law Article 23 and the large-scale July 1 protests in mid-2003 against the unpopular Tung Chee-hwa administration. The election saw the devastating defeat of the pro-government pro-Beijing camp.

The pro-Beijing flagship party Democratic Alliance for the Betterment of Hong Kong (DAB) received the largest defeat in the elections, only 62 of the 206 of its candidates were elected. The party's heavyweights, Yeung Yiu-chung, Lau Kong-wah and Ip Kwok-him all lost their seats to the pro-democracy challengers, with Ip lost his longtime base of Kwun Lung to Cyd Ho of The Frontier. Choy So-yuk also faced challenge from Leung Kwok-hung of April Fifth Action, only retained her seat with narrow margin. DAB chairman Tsang Yok-sing resigned for the party's defeat after the election, and subsequently was replaced by Ma Lik. The pro-democracy camp received overall success, with Democratic Party winning the most of 95 seats.

After the election, Chief Executive Tung Chee-hwa appointed 102 pro-government members to the District Councils to dilute the influence of the pro-democrats and retained control of some of the councils.

== Overview ==
Before the elections were held, media had speculated the effect of the controversy over the legislation of the Hong Kong Basic Law Article 23 to the pro-Beijing camp. With the surge of popularity after the 2003 July 1 protests, the pro-democrats managed to present a united platform in the District Council election. More than two hundred candidates form all pro-democracy parties and groups supported the direct election of the Chief Executive by 2007; direct elections of all seats of the Legislative Council by 2008; the initiation of public consultations on political reforms by the government before the end of 2003; and the abolition of all appointed seats to the District Councils after the November 2003 elections.

The pro-democrat candidates challenged the heavyweights of the Democratic Alliance for the Betterment of Hong Kong (DAB), the flagship pro-government party in many constituencies, including the party vice-chairman Ip Kwok-him's Kwun Lung, Choy So-yuk's Kam Ping, Yeung Yiu-chung's Mei Foo South and Lau Kong-wah's Kam To. Lau Kong-wah stood in Kam To, challenging Democratic Party's Shirley Ho Suk-ping. As Lau was the Legislative Councillor for New Territories East, pro-democrats saw Kam To as a crucial target. Icons like Audrey Eu, Alan Leong and Cheung Man-kwong took turns campaigning for Shirley Ho. Standing in the traditional Hokkien community Kam Ping, Choy so-yuk faced the challenged from Leung Kwok-hung of the April Fifth Action, while The Frontier's Cyd Ho stood in Kwun Lung against Ip Kwok-him. Both Ho and Ip were members of the Legislative Council, while Ip chaired the Legco committee on the national security bill. Ho was supported by Article 45 Concern Group's Ronny Tong and Ip was supported by the DAB chairman Tsang Yok-sing.

An unprecedented record of 44 percent, in total of 1.06 millions voters cast their vote in the election. In result, Yeung Yiu-chung, Lau Kong-wah and Ip Kwok-him were all defeated by the pro-democrats while Choy So-yuk retained her seat with narrow margin. The pro-democracy flagship party Democratic Party became the clear winner by winning the most number of 95 seats. Cyd Ho's Civic Act-up which was established after the July 1 protest also captured three seats in the Wan Chai District Council and was able to control the council for the first time with the other independent councillors. Only 62 of the 206 DAB candidates were elected, which became the worst defeat in DAB's history. Tsang Yok-sing took responsibility for the electoral setback and resigned his chairman post. He claimed that the defeat was due to the DAB's unfortunate "Tung loyalist" public image.

== Results ==
=== General outcome ===
Summary of the 23 November 2003 District Councils of Hong Kong election results
Political Affiliation	Popular vote	%	%±	Standing	Elected	±
Democratic Alliance for the Betterment of Hong Kong	241,202	22.94	▼0.59	200	62	▼21
Civil Force	25,720	2.45	▲0.02	22	17	▲3
Liberal Party	29,108	2.77	▼0.65	27	14	▲1
Hong Kong Progressive Alliance	29,091	2.77	▼0.05	23	13	▼5
Wan Chai Community Union	1,189	0.11	-	1	1	-
Hong Kong Federation of Trade Unions	2,766	0.26	▲0.13	3	0	-
New Youth Forum	1,314	0.12	-	2	0	-
New Century Forum	833	0.08	-	1	0	-
Federation of Hong Kong and Kowloon Labour Unions	-	-	-	1	1	-
Independent and others	156,827	14.92	-	136	92	▼6
Total for pro-Beijing camp	489,889	46.48	▼0.97	417	201	▼28
Democratic Party	223,675	21.27	▼3.57	120	95	▲17
Hong Kong Association for Democracy and People's Livelihood	53,264	5.07	▲0.36	37	25	▲4
Frontier	25,349	2.41	▲1.25	14	6	▲1
Neighbourhood and Worker's Service Centre	14,146	1.35	▲0.94	5	4	▲1
Yuen Long Tin Shui Wai Democratic Alliance	8,418	0.80	-	6	4	▲2
Civic Act-up	5,170	0.49	-	5	3	▲3
Central and Western Democratic Power	5,748	0.55	-	4	2	-
Hong Kong Confederation of Trade Unions	4,032	0.38	-	3	2	▲2
Yuen Long Democratic Alliance	1,489	0.14	-	1	1	-
7.1 People Pile	2,888	0.27	-	3	0	-
April Fifth Action	1,149	0.11	-	1	0	-
Citizens Party	361	0.03	▼0.22	1	0	▼1
Independent democrats	130,453	12.41	-	87	56	▲8
Total for pro-democracy camp	477,596	45.54	▲10.29	288	198	▲38
Independent and others	83,939	7.98	-	132	1	-
Total (turnout 44.10%)	1,051,424	100.0	-	837	400	▲10

=== Results by district ===
Council	Previous control	Previous party	Post-election control	Largest party	DP	DAB	ADPL	CF	Lib	PA	TF/CA	Others	Pro-dem	Pro-Beijing	Appointed & ex officio	Composition	Details
Central & Western	Pro-Beijing	Democratic	Pro-Beijing	Democratic	6	1			2		2	4	9	6	4		Details
Wan Chai	Pro-Beijing	DAB	NOC	CAU	2	1					3	5	7	4	3		Details
Eastern	Pro-Beijing	DAB	Pro-Beijing	DAB	6	12			1	1		17	12	24	9		Details
Southern	Pro-Beijing	Democratic	Pro-Beijing	Democratic	2	1			2			12	2	15	4		Details
Yau Tsim Mong	Pro-Beijing	Democratic	Pro-Beijing	Democratic	4	2	3					7	9	7	4		Details
Sham Shui Po	Pro-democracy	ADPL	Pro-democracy	ADPL	2	1	13					5	17	4	5		Details
Kowloon City	Pro-Beijing	PA	Pro-Beijing	Democratic	7	2	3		3	1		6	12	10	5		Details
Wong Tai Sin	Pro-Beijing	DAB	Pro-Beijing	DAB	4	5	2		1		2	11	13	12	6		Details
Kwun Tong	Pro-Beijing	Democratic	Pro-Beijing	Democratic	9	4			1			20	20	14	8		Details
Tsuen Wan	Pro-Beijing	Democratic	Pro-Beijing	Democratic	5	1			1	1		9	11	6	5+2		Details
Tuen Mun	Pro-Beijing	Democratic	Pro-Beijing	DAB	9	9	4			1		6	14	15	7+1		Details
Yuen Long	Pro-Beijing	DAB	Pro-Beijing	DAB	2	4			1	1		21	7	22	7+6		Details
North	Pro-Beijing	Democratic	Pro-Beijing	Democratic	8	5						3	10	6	5+4		Details
Tai Po	Pro-Beijing	Democratic	Pro-Beijing	Democratic	7	3				2	1	6	9	10	5+2		Details
Sai Kung	Pro-Beijing	DAB	Pro-Beijing	DAB	4	4		3		4		5	8	12	5+2		Details
Sha Tin	Pro-Beijing	Civil Force	Pro-Beijing	Civil Force	7	2		14	1	1	2	9	14	22	9+1		Details
Kwai Tsing	Pro-democracy	Democratic	Pro-democracy	Democratic	11	1			1	1		14	23	5	7+1		Details
Islands	Pro-Beijing	DAB	Pro-Beijing	DAB		4						4	1	7	4+8		Details
TOTAL					95	62	25	17	14	13	10	164	196	202	129		

=== Vote summary ===
Votes, of total, by camp
1. Pro-Beijing (46.5%)
2. Pro-democrats (45.5%)
3. Other (7.98%)
Seats, of total, by camp
1. Pro-Beijing (50.2%)
2. Pro-democrats (49.5%)
3. Other (0.25%)

Popular vote
DAB	22.94%
Democratic	21.27%
ADPL	5.07%
Liberal	2.77%
PA	2.77%
Civil Force	2.45%
Frontier	2.41%
NWSC	1.35%
Others	40.31%

=== Seat summary ===
Seats
Democratic	23.75%
DAB	15.50%
ADPL	6.25%
Civil Force	4.25%
Liberal	3.50%
PA	3.25%
Frontier	1.75%
NWSC	1.00%
Others	40.75%

== Aftermath ==
In December 2003 after the elections, Tung appointed 21 political party appointees to the District Councils to dilute the influence of the pro-democrats as follows:

- 8 members of the Liberal Party
- 6 members of the DAB
- 6 members from the Progressive Alliance
- 1 from the New Century Forum

Professor of politics and sociology at Lingnan University, Dr. Li Pang-kwong said "As in the past, most of the appointees were pro-government or persons without a clear political stance... ensur[ing] that no district council is in the hands of the democrats."

A spokesman for the democrats said the appointees "will have an unfair advantage in that they are getting financial support from the government which will help them run for office in future elections."
