= 1999 Hong Kong local elections =

- 28 November 1999

All Elected Constituencies 390 (of the 519) seats in all 18 Districts Councils
- Registered: 2,832,524 ▲15.60%
- Turnout: 816,503 (35.82%) ▲2.71pp
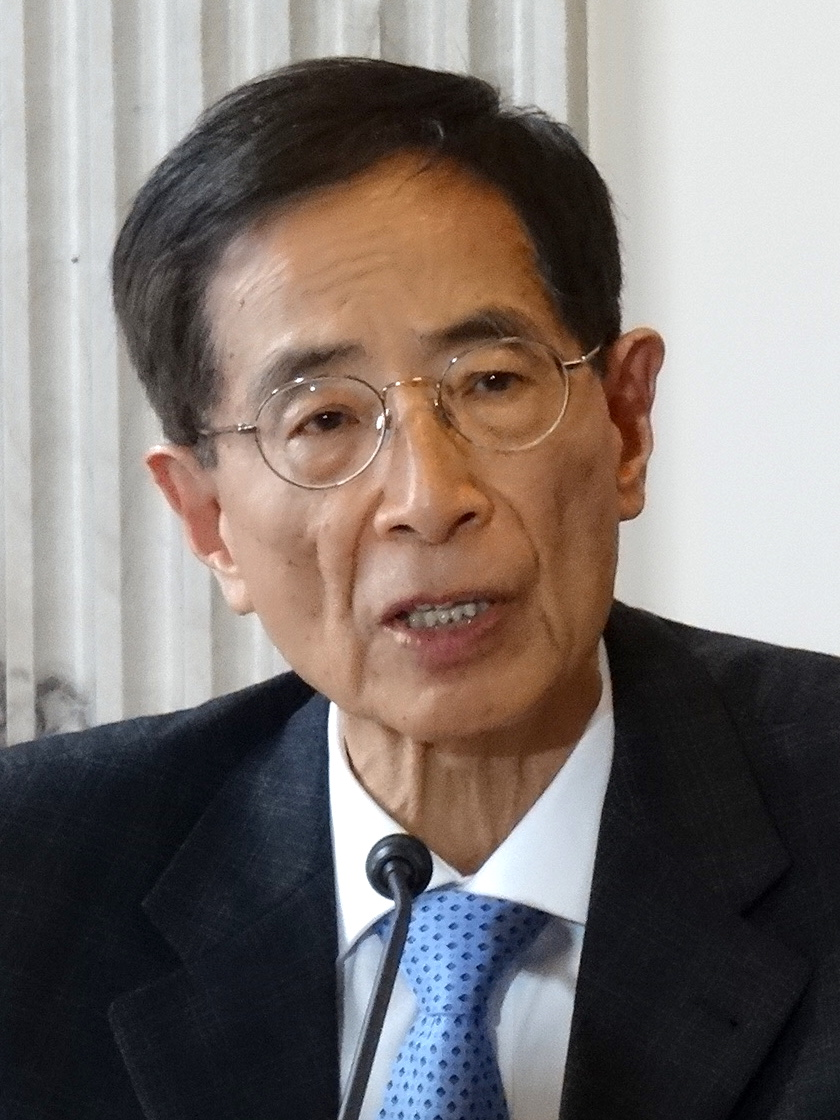

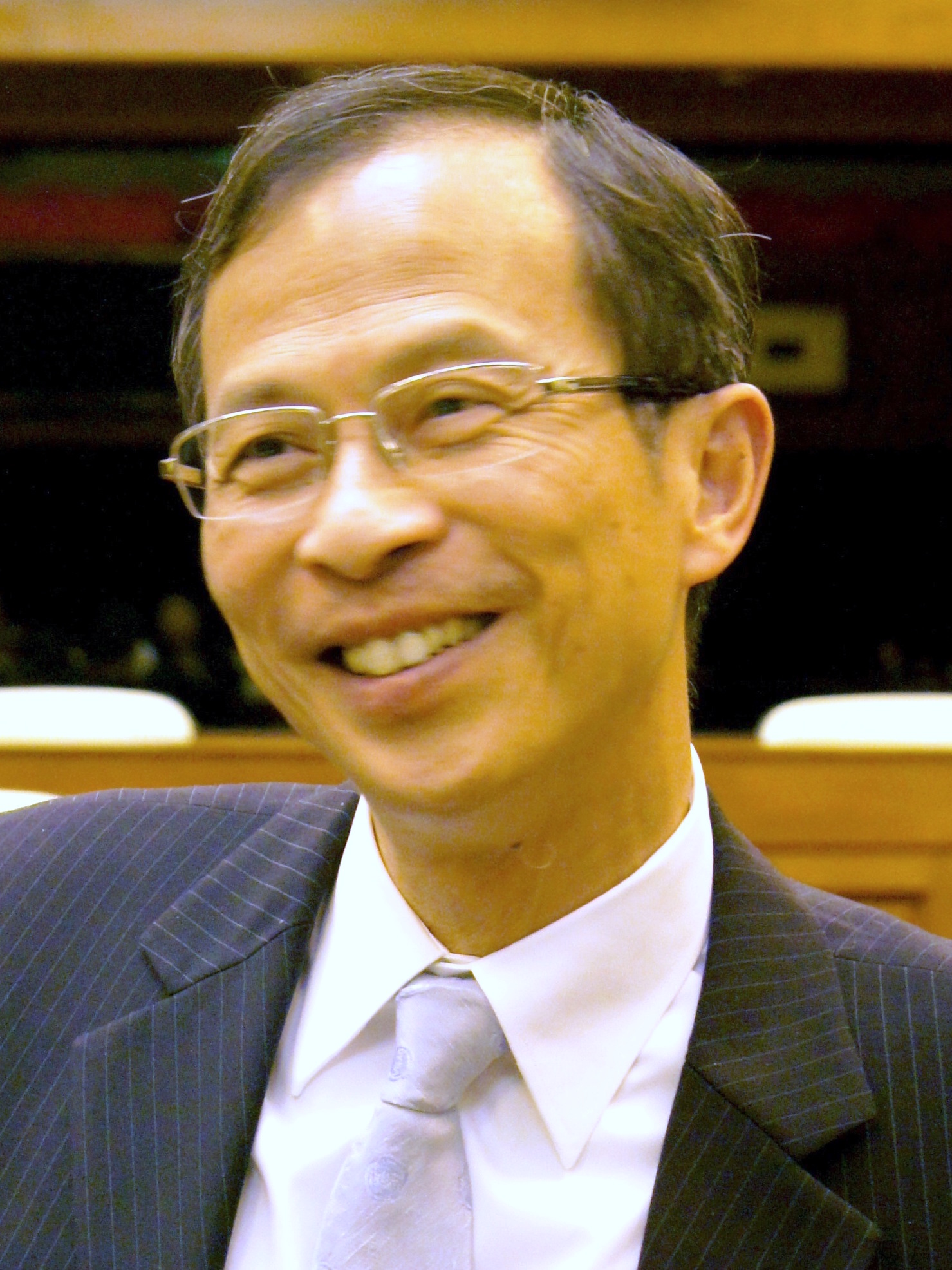

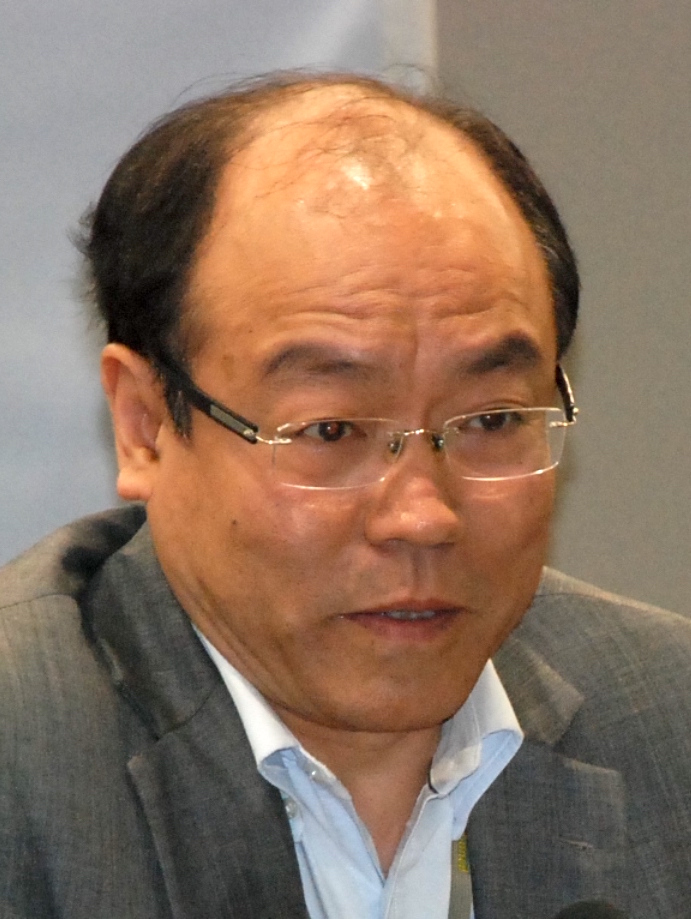

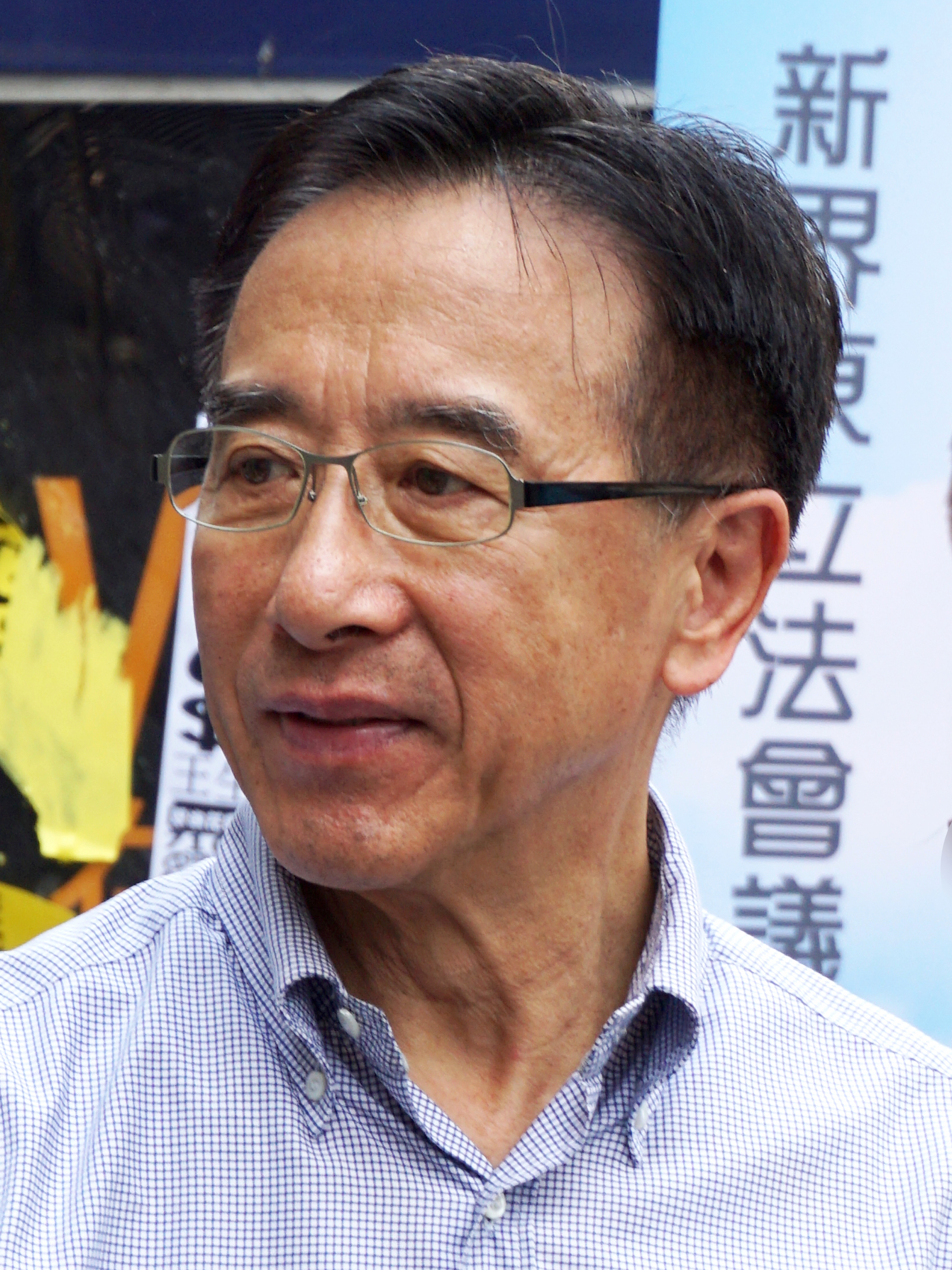

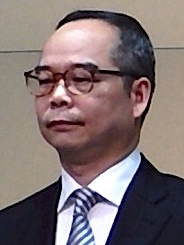

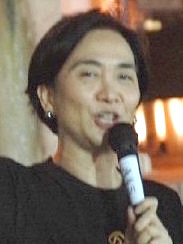

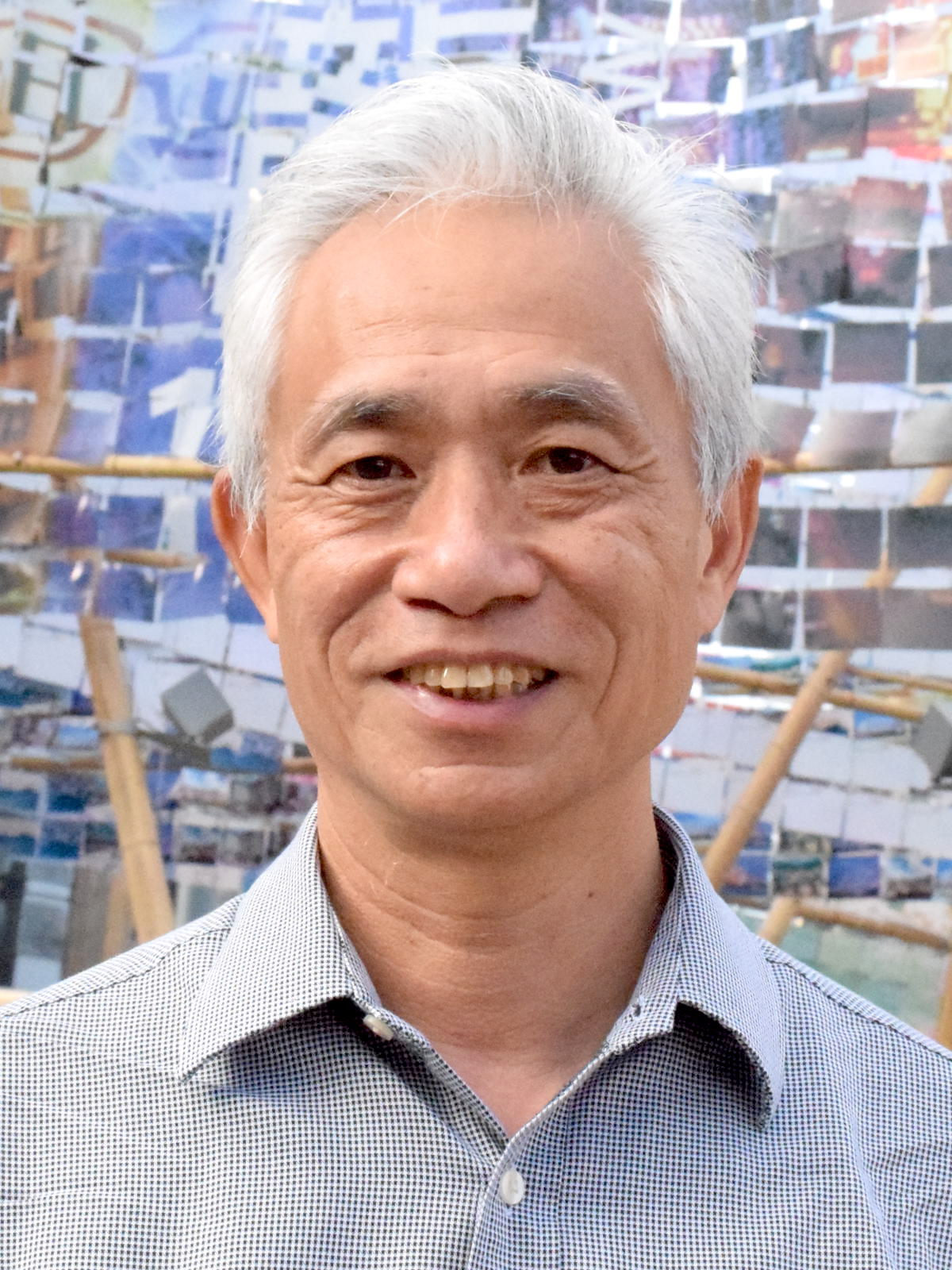
	First party	Second party	Third party
Leader	Martin Lee	Tsang Yok-sing	Frederick Fung
Party	Democratic	DAB	ADPL
Alliance	Pro-democracy	Pro-Beijing	Pro-democracy
Last election	75 seats, 23.01%	37 seats, 11.82%	29 seats, 6.95%
Seats won	86	83	19
Seat change	▲13	▲27	▲1
Popular vote	201,461	190,792	38,119
Percentage	24.85%	23.53%	4.70%
Swing	▲1.69pp	▲11.82pp	▼2.25pp
	Fourth party	Fifth party	Sixth party
Leader	Ambrose Lau	James Tien	Lau Kong-wah
Party	HKPA	Liberal	Civil Force
Alliance	Pro-Beijing	Pro-Beijing	Pro-Beijing
Last election	12 seats, 4.19%	18 seats, 7.39%	10 seats, 1.77%
Seats won	16	15	11
Seat change	▼1	▼2	▲2
Popular vote	23,168	27,718	19,633
Percentage	2.86%	3.42%	2.42%
Swing	▼1.33pp	▼3.98pp	▲0.65pp
	Seventh party	Eighth party	Ninth party
Leader	Yum Sin-ling	Emily Lau	Leung Yiu-chung
Party	123DA	Frontier	NWSC
Alliance	Pro-democracy	Pro-democracy	Pro-democracy
Last election	5 seats, 2.01%	New party	1 seat, 0.13%
Seats won	6	4	2
Seat change	Steady	▲1	Steady
Popular vote	11,396	9,388	3,295
Percentage	1.41%	1.16%	0.41%
Swing	▼0.60pp	N/A	▲0.28pp
- Map of the winning party by constituency

The 1999 Hong Kong District Council elections were held on 28 November 1999 for all 18 districts of Hong Kong, for 390 members from directly elected constituencies out of total 519 council members. It was the first District Council election after the handover of Hong Kong in 1997, replacing the existing Provisional District Councils appointed by Chief Executive Tung Chee-hwa.

The pro-Beijing camp scored fairly well in the election, with the flagship pro-Beijing party, the Democratic Alliance for the Betterment of Hong Kong (DAB), improved its performance in catching up with the Democratic Party, the largest pro-democracy party. The Democratic Party sustained its political momentum by securing 24.9 per cent of the votes as compared to 22.8 per cent in 1994. The DAB and the Democratic Party became the largest parties in the District Councils, while DAB captured 83 seats out of 176 candidates, the Democratic Party captured 86 out of 173 candidates. The pro-grassroots pro-democracy party, the Association for Democracy and People's Livelihood (ADPL), appeared to lose some popular support from 7 per cent of the total vote in 1994 to 4.7 per cent in 1999.

Overall, the pro-democracy forces failed to enhance their influence and outperform the pro-Beijing camp. After the election, Tung Chee-hwa reintroduced appointed members to the District Councils, appointing 102 pro-government members to prevent the pro-democracy camp from dominating the councils.

== Overview ==
In comparison to the 1994 District Board elections, the pro-Beijing camp improved their performance and closed the gap with the pro-democracy camp. Although the Democratic Party maintained its share of votes, its success rate decline slightly due to the fct the party nominated far more candidates than it had in the 1994 elections. The Democratic Party contested directly with the Democratic Alliance for the Betterment of Hong Kong (DAB), the pro-Beijing party, in 96 constituencies, of which 54 were won by the Democrats, 36 by the DAB contenders and 6 by other candidates. Incumbents changing their constituencies such as Stanley Ng Wing-fai in Yau Tsim Mong District and Shirley Ho Suk-ping in the Sha Tin District were defeated by the pro-Beijing candidates.

Other pro-democracy parties such as the 123 Democratic Alliance and the Association for Democracy and People's Livelihood (ADPL) failed to achieve any breakthrough in elections. The 123 Democratic Alliance increased both its success rate and the number of candidates, but only winning 6 seats. It remained a small party and was eventually dissolved in 2000 due to the lack of financial support from the Taiwan government. The ADPL filled less candidates partly due to some ADPL defecting to the Democratic Party in 1997 after the internal dispute over the question of joining the Beijing-controlled Provisional Legislative Council. The ADPL failed to penetrate into other districts apart from its political base at Shamshuipo. The Frontier and the Citizens Party remained uninterested in the local elections, with the Frontier nominated only 9 candidates to compete in Sha Tin and Eastern districts, of which 4 of them were elected. The Citizens Party had only Chan Tim-shing elected in the Eastern District.

The pro-Beijing camp relied on the DAB to counter the pro-democracy forces. The DAB drastically increased its numbers of candidates from 83 in 1994 to 176 in 1999. Its success rate also rose from 44.6 per cent to 47.2 per cent, contributed by the strong grassroots work of the DAB candidates. The pro-business Liberal Party improved its performance by lower its candidates form 89 to 34, with success rate rising from 20.2 to 44.1 per cent. The Liberal Party recruited some candidates with strong grassroots networks prior the elections to compensate its weakness in district works. The party leaders, such as Chairman James Tien Pei-chun, legislators Selina Chow Liang Shuk-yee and Howard Young also contested in the elections, though Chow was defeated. The Hong Kong Progressive Alliance (PA) strategically merged with the Liberal Democratic Federation of Hong Kong (LDF), nominating fewer candidates and improving its performance by winning 16 as compared to 12 in 1994. The stronghold of PA remained in the Kowloon City District, with the expansion of its influence to Sai Kung and Sha Tin districts. The Shatin-based Civil Force slightly increased its number of seats but saw a decline in its success rate.

== Results ==
=== General outcome ===
Summary of the 28 November 1999 District Councils of Hong Kong election results
Political Affiliation	Popular vote	%	%±	Standing	Elected	±
Democratic Alliance for the Betterment of Hong Kong	190,792	23.53	▲11.82	176	83	▲27
Hong Kong Progressive Alliance	23,168	2.86	▼1.33	25	16	▼1
Liberal Party	27,718	3.42	▼3.98	34	15	▼3
Civil Force	19,633	2.42	▲0.65	14	11	▲2
Hong Kong Federation of Trade Unions	1,074	0.13	-	1	1	▲1
New Territories Heung Yee Kuk	942	0.12	-	1	1	0
Hong Kong Chinese Reform Association	-	-	-	1	1	0
Independent and others	177,774	21.92	-	180	104	▼4
Total for pro-Beijing camp	443,441	54.69	-	436	232	▲22
Democratic Party	201,461	24.85	▲1.69	173	86	▲13
Hong Kong Association for Democracy and People's Livelihood	38,119	4.70	▼2.25	32	19	▲1
123 Democratic Alliance	11,396	1.41	▼0.60	10	6	0
Frontier	9,388	1.16	-	9	4	▲1
Neighbourhood and Worker's Service Centre	3,295	0.41	-	3	2	0
Citizens Party	2,072	0.26	-	1	1	0
Hong Kong Democratic Foundation	1,392	0.17	▼0.42	1	1	0
Independent democrats	58,706	7.24	-	54	38	▲7
Total for pro-democracy camp	325,829	40.18	-	283	157	▲22
Independent and others	41,593	5.13	-	79	1	0
Total (turnout 35.82%)	810,863	100.0	-	798	390	▲44

Note1: The total seats of the District Councils are 519 including 27 ex-officio members (Rural Committee Chairmen in the New Territories), and 102 members appointed members by the Chief Executive of Hong Kong.
Note2: Councilor Lau Kong-wah who ran under both DAB and Civil Force banners is counted as a DAB member in this chart.

=== Results by district ===
Council	Post-election control	Largest party	DP	DAB	ADPL	PA	Lib	CF	123DA	TF	Others	Pro-dem	Pro-Beijing	Appointed & ex officio	Composition	Details
Central & Western	Pro-Beijing	Democratic	5	3			1		1		5	8	7	4		Details
Wan Chai	Pro-Beijing	DAB	2	3			1				5	2	9	3		Details
Eastern	Pro-Beijing	DAB	6	13		1	2			1	11	10	26	9		Details
Southern	Pro-Beijing	Democratic	2	2			2				11	2	15	4		Details
Yau Tsim Mong	Pro-Beijing	Democratic	4	2	1				1		8	7	9	4		Details
Sham Shui Po	Pro-democracy	ADPL	3	3	10				1		4	15	6	5		Details
Kowloon City	Pro-Beijing	PA	4	3	1	5	4				5	6	16	5		Details
Wong Tai Sin	Pro-Beijing	Democratic	7	5	2	1					10	12	13	6		Details
Kwun Tong	Pro-Beijing	Democratic	9	6							19	17	17	8		Details
Tsuen Wan	Pro-Beijing	Democratic	6	1		1	3				6	10	7	5+2		Details
Tuen Mun	Pro-Beijing	Democratic	9	7	4	1			2		6	15	14	7+1		Details
Yuen Long	Pro-Beijing	DAB	1	7					1		14	3	20	7+6		Details
North	Pro-Beijing	Democratic	7	6							3	8	8	5+4		Details
Tai Po	Pro-Beijing	Democratic	5	4		1	1				8	6	13	5+2		Details
Sai Kung	Pro-Beijing	DAB	3	5		3					6	4	13	5+2		Details
Sha Tin	Pro-Beijing	Civil Force	3	9		3	1	11		3	6	8	28	9+1		Details
Kwai Tsing	Pro-democracy	Democratic	10	2	1						15	23	5	7+1		Details
Islands	Pro-Beijing	DAB		2							5	1	6	4+8		Details
TOTAL			86	83	19	16	15	11	6	4	145	157	232	129		

=== Vote summary ===
Votes, of total, by camp
1. Pro-Beijing (54.7%)
2. Pro-democrats (40.2%)
3. Other (5.13%)
Seats, of total, by camp
1. Pro-Beijing (59.5%)
2. Pro-democrats (40.3%)
3. Other (0.25%)

Popular vote
Democratic	24.85%
DAB	23.53%
ADPL	4.70%
Liberal	3.42%
PA	2.65%
Civil Force	2.42%
123DA	1.54%
Frontier	1.16%
Others	35.86%

=== Seat summary ===
Seats
Democratic	22.05%
DAB	21.28%
ADPL	4.87%
PA	4.10%
Liberal	3.85%
Civil Force	2.82%
123DA	1.41%
Frontier	1.03%
Others	38.59%

== Aftermath ==
Tung Chee-hwa appointed 102 members to the District Council after the election to prevent the pro-democracy camp from dominating the District Councils. These included 41 from various political parties, namely the Liberal Party, the Democratic Alliance for the Betterment of Hong Kong, and the Hong Kong Progressive Alliance. There were no democrats appointed. The pro-democrats thus lost their domination of the Kwun Tong, Wong Tai Sin and Yau Tsim Mong District Councils where the pro-democrats had 15, 11 and 6 directly elected seats while pro-Beijing camp gained 15, 10 and 6 seats and 18, 14 and 8 seats after the appointments respectively.
