= New People's Party–Civil Force =

Political alliance in Hong Kong

The New People's Party formed a political alliance with the Civil Force in February 2014.

Both in the pro-Beijing camp, the Civil Force, formed by community leader as well as Democratic Alliance for the Betterment and Progress of Hong Kong politician Lau Kong-wah, had had a deep roots in Sha Tin District for decades and had been the largest political force in the Sha Tin District Council, having 15 District Councillors elected in the 2011 District Council election, while New People's Party which was established by Regina Ip Lau Suk-yee in 2011 was rather young, got only 4 of its candidates elected in the District Council election. During the 2012 Hong Kong Chief Executive election, Regina Ip decided to run for the office but failed to get enough nominations from the Election Committee.

After the 2012 Legislative Council election, where Lau Kong-wah gave up his seat in the New Territories East where the Civil Force was based and was defeated in the territory-wide District Council (Second) constituency, the Civil Force lost its representative in the region. The New People's Party increased its representation from one to two, with Michael Tien Puk-sun elected in New Territories West.

In February 2014, the two groups officially formed an alliance, with Civil Force leader Pun Kwok-shan appointed to one of the Vice-Chairmanships of the New People's Party. With 17 Civil Force District Councillors and 2 independents joined the New People's Party, the party's seat in the District Councils jumped from 12 to 31.
