= Civil Force =

Civil Force 公民力量
- Chairman: Pun Kwok-shan
- Founded: December 1993
- Headquarters: Flat F, 1st Floor, Kam Fai Building, 74 Chik Fuk Street, Tai Wai
- Alliance partner: New People's Party
- Ideology: Chinese nationalism Conservatism (HK); Sha Tin regionalism
- Regional affiliation: Pro-Beijing camp
- Colours: Green
- Legislative Council: 1 / 90
- District Councils: 13 / 470

Website
- civilforce.org.hk

Civil Force (Chinese: 公民力量) is a pro-Beijing, district-based political party in Hong Kong. Since 2014, the Civil Force has entered an alliance with the New People's Party of Regina Ip. Headed by chairman Pun Kwok-shan, it has its stronghold in the Sha Tin District where it is, as of 2025, the largest party by number of seats.

== History ==
It was established in 1993 by a former member of United Democrats of Hong Kong, Lau Kong-wah and 8 other Sha Tin District Board members.

Lau was defeated by Emily Lau in both the 1991 LegCo elections and the 1995 LegCo elections. In 1996, Lau secured a seat in the Provisional Legislative Council. He was elected into LegCo in since 1998 LegCo elections in the New Territories East geographical constituency, after he joined the pro-Beijing Democratic Alliance for Betterment of Hong Kong (DAB).

In 2003, due to the pro-government stance of DAB especially on the issue of implementing Article 23 of the Basic Law, the popularity of Lau, being a member of the DAB, was affected, and the Civil Force performed not as well in the 2003 District Council elections. Campaigns of some of the members emphasise more on the banner of Civil Force and their local contributions, and did not mention the convenor's connection with the DAB. Lau himself lost the seat in the Kam To constituency for the Sha Tin District Council despite his long service in the district. The Civil Force retained 14 seats in the Sha Tin District Council, and 3 seats in the Sai Kung District Council.

In the 2012 Legislative Council election, Lau Kong-wah lost in the District Council (Second) functional constituency election while the newly joined member Scarlett Pong failed to win a seat in the New Territories East constituency. Civil Force had not been represented in the Legislative Council for the first time. It returned to the legislature with one seat when LegCo member Lam Tai-fai joined the Civil Force on 1 January 2013.

The Civil Force formed a political alliance with the New People's Party (NPP), headed by Regina Ip, in February 2014. Civil Force leader Pun Kwok-shan was appointed Vice-Chairman of the New People's Party, while members of either parties can acquire membership of the other party. The alliance fielded 23 candidates to contest the 2015 District Council elections and won 11 seats. Some Civil Force district councilors withdrew from NPP to avoid the political impact.

Eunice Yung won a seat for Civil Force and NPP in the 2016 Legislative Council election in New Territories East.

In 2019, amidst the ongoing social movement against the extradition bill, the pro-Beijing camp suffered unprecedented defeat in the District Council elections. The NPP-Civil Force alliance fielded 28 candidates but did not win any seats. As a result, Civil Force was eliminated from all the district councils for the first time since its establishment.

In 2023, after the electoral reforms, NPP-Civil Force regained its dominant position in Sha Tin.

== Election performances ==
=== Legislative Council elections ===
Election	Number of popular votes	% of popular votes	GC seats	FC seats	EC seats	Total seats	+/−
1995	27,841	3.05	0	0	0	0 / 60	0
1998	DAB ticket		1	0	0	1 / 60	—N/a
2000	DAB ticket		1	0	0	1 / 60	0
2004	DAB ticket		1	0	–	1 / 60	0
2008	DAB ticket		1	0	–	1 / 60	0
2012	23,988	1.32	0	0	–	0 / 70	1▼
2016	NPP ticket		1	0	–	1 / 70	1▲
2021	NPP ticket		1	0	1	2 / 90	1▲

=== Municipal elections ===
Election	Number of popular votes	% of popular votes	UrbCo seats	RegCo seats	Total elected seats
1995	10,546	1.89	0 / 32	1 / 27	1 / 59

=== District Councils elections ===
Election	Number of popular votes	% of popular votes	Total elected seats	+/−
1994	12,141	1.77	10 / 346	7▲
1999	19,633▲	2.42▲	11 / 390	2▲
2003	27,605▲	2.63▲	17 / 400	3▲
2007	30,880▲	2.71▲	18 / 405	3▲
2011	36,833▲	3.12▲	16 / 412	2▼
2015	NPP ticket		11 / 431	6▼
2019	55,879	1.91	0 / 452	10▼

== Representatives ==
=== Legislative Council ===
Constituency	Member
New Territories East	Dominic Lee

=== District Councils ===
District	Constituency	Member
Sai Kung	Po Lam	Alfred Au Ning-fat
Sai Kung	Tak Ming	Wan Yuet-cheung
Sha Tin	Lek Yuen	Michael Wong Yue-hon
Sha Tin	City One	Wong Ka-wing
Sha Tin	Yue Shing	Victor Leung Ka-fai
Sha Tin	Hin Ka	Lam Chung-yan
Sha Tin	Lower Shing Mun	Tong Hok-leung
Sha Tin	Wan Shing	Ho Hau-cheung
Sha Tin	Tin Sum	Pun Kwok-shan
Sha Tin	Yu Yan	Yiu Ka-chun
Sha Tin	Kwong Yuen	Chan Man-kuen
