= Sha Tin District Council =

Hong Kong district council

Coordinates: 22.385650°N 114.186977°E

Sha Tin District Council 沙田區議會

Type
- Type: Hong Kong District Council of the Sha Tin District

History
- Founded: 1 April 1981 (District Board); 1 July 1997 (Provisional); 1 January 2000 (District Council)

Leadership
- Chair: Frederick Yu Wai-shing, Independent
- Vice-Chair: Vacant

Structure
- Seats: 42 councillors consisting of 8 elected member 16 district committee members 17 appointed members 1 ex officio member
- NPP/CF: 13 / 42
- DAB: 9 / 42
- FTU: 3 / 42
- BPA: 1 / 42
- Independent: 16 / 42

Elections
- Voting system: First past the post
- Last election: 10 December 2023

Meeting place
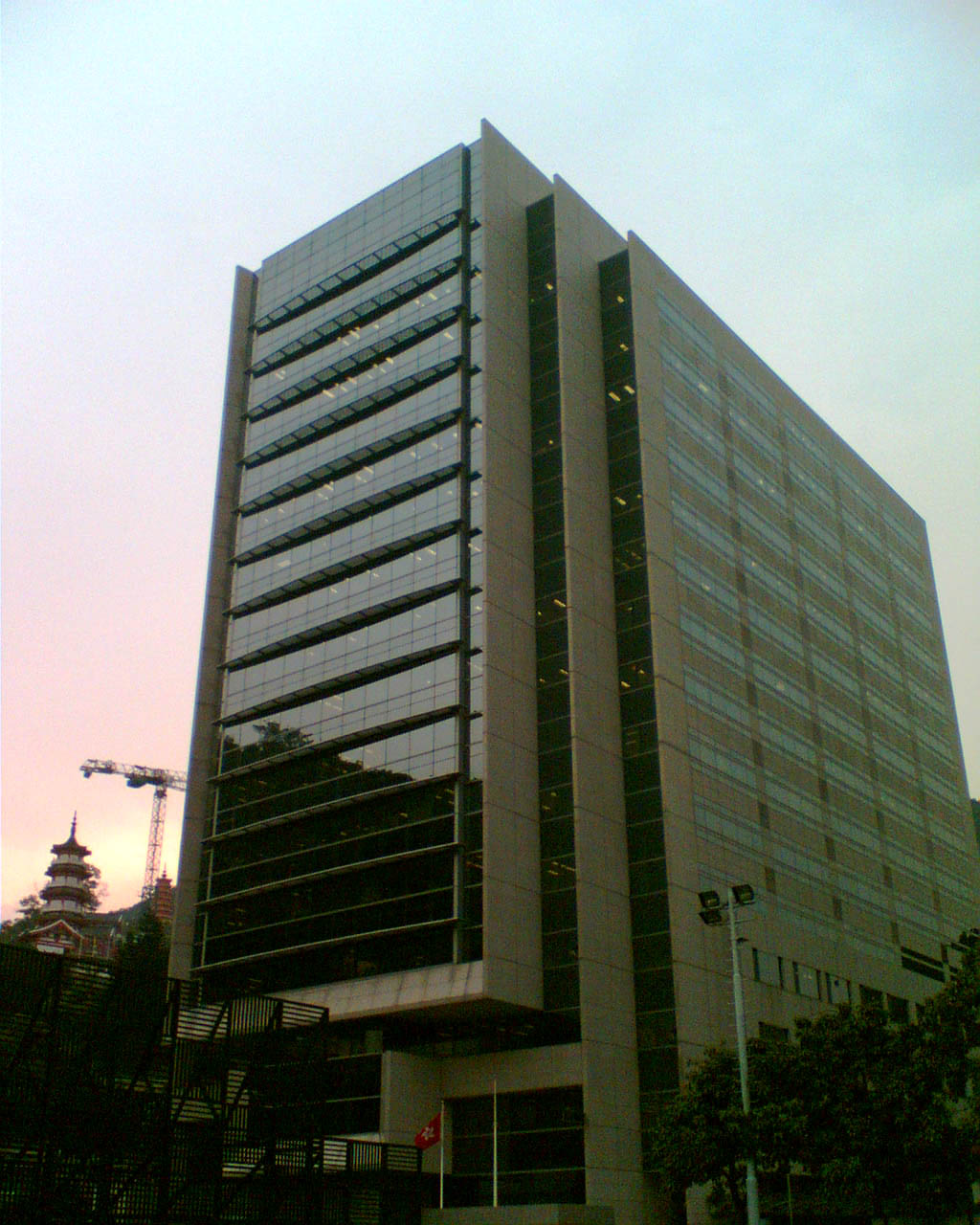
- 4/F Sha Tin Government Offices, 1 Sheung Wo Che Road, Sha Tin, New Territories

Website
- www.districtcouncils.gov.hk/st/

Sha Tin District Council
- Traditional Chinese: 沙田區議會
Transcriptions
Yue: Cantonese
- Yale Romanization: Sā tìhn kēui yíh wúih
- Jyutping: Saa1 tin4 keoi1 ji5 wui5

The Sha Tin District Council (noted as ST) is the district council for the Sha Tin District in Hong Kong. It is one of 18 such councils. The Sha Tin District Council currently consists of 42 members, of which the district is divided into four constituencies, electing a total of 8 members, 16 district committee members, 17 appointed members, and one ex officio member who is the Sha Tin rural committee chairman. The latest election was held on 10 December 2023.

== History ==
The Sha Tin District Council was established on 1 April 1981 under the name of the Sha Tin District Board as the result of the colonial Governor Murray MacLehose's District Administration Scheme reform. The District Board was partly elected with the ex-officio Regional Council members and Sha Tin Rural Committee chairman, as well as members appointed by the Governor until 1994 when last Governor Chris Patten refrained from appointing any member.

The Sha Tin District Board became Sha Tin Provisional District Board after the Hong Kong Special Administrative Region (HKSAR) was established in 1997 with the appointment system being reintroduced by Chief Executive Tung Chee-hwa. The current Sha Tin District Council was established on 1 January 2000 after the first District Council election in 1999. The appointed seats were abolished in 2015 after the modified constitutional reform proposal was passed by the Legislative Council in 2010.

As a new town in the 1980s, Sha Tin was a strategic target for emerging pro-democracy activists, when the three major pro-democracy political groups Hong Kong Affairs Society (HKAS), Hong Kong Association for Democracy and People's Livelihood (ADPL) and Meeting Point formed a strategic alliance in the 1988 District Board election, which saw prominent politicians Fung Chi-wood, Lau Kong-wah and Choy Kan-pui launched their political careers. Lau and Choy later quit the pro-democracy United Democrats of Hong Kong (UDHK) after the 1991 Legislative Council direct election and formed a new district-based political group Civil Force in which all its candidates were elected in the 1994 election and have been dominating the council since.

The 2000s saw the intense competitions between the Democratic Alliance for the Betterment of Hong Kong (DAB) and the Democratic Party, which saw the DAB dropped its seat from 1999 election's nine to 2003 election's two due to the anti-government sentiments following the historic 2003 July 1 protest, many of those in Ma On Shan fallen into the Democrats' hand with the defeats of Lau Kong-wah and Chan Hak-kan in Kam To and Chung On. The DAB rebounded from its defeat in the 2007 election, retaking most of its seats from the Democrats.

In 2014, Regina Ip's New People's Party (NPP) expanded its network to Sha Tin by absorbing the Civil Force, making NPP the largest party in the district. In the 2015 District Council election, the first election after the Umbrella Revolution, the pan-democrats made a surprising advance in the district, doubling their seats from 8 to 19 seats by defeating a number of veteran Civil Force councillors. The DAB also suffered some unexpected defeats in Ma On Shan, with incumbent Legislative Councillor Elizabeth Quat lost her seat to Labour Party new face Yip Wing in Chung On. However, The pro-Beijing camp was able to retain control of the council with a one-seat majority of the ex-officio seat occupied by the Sha Tin Rural Committee chairman.

In the historic landslide victory in 2019, the pro-democrats took control of the council by sweeping 40 of the 41 elected seats. Only the new constituency Di Yee was won by pro-Beijing DAB as two pro-democrat candidates split the votes which gave the DAB the victory.

In the 2023 District Council election, 8 of the 42 seats on the Sha Tin District Council will be elected by elected members, 16 seats will be elected by district committees, 17 appointed members, and 1 ex-officio member will form the current Sha Tin District In the Parliament, among the 42 members, 16 are independent members, 13 are from the New People Party, 9 are from the Democratic Alliance for the Betterment of China, 3 are from the Federation of Trade Unions, and 1 is from the BPA. Among the 42 members of the House of Representatives, 42 are from the pro-establishment camp.

== Political control ==
Since 1982 political control of the council has been held by the following parties:

Camp in control	Largest party	Years	Composition
No Overall Control	None	1982–1985	
Pro-government	None	1985–1988	
Pro-government	Hong Kong Affairs Society	1988–1991	
Pro-government	United Democrats	1991–1994	
Pro-Beijing	Civil Force	1994–1997	
Pro-Beijing	Civil Force	1997–1999	
Pro-Beijing	Civil Force	2000–2003	
Pro-Beijing	Civil Force	2004–2007	
Pro-Beijing	Civil Force	2008–2011	
Pro-Beijing	Civil Force → NPP/CF	2012–2015	
Pro-Beijing	NPP/CF	2016–2019	
Pro-democracy	Civic → Democratic	2020–2023	

== Political makeup ==

Elections are held every four years. As of October 19, 2020:

Political party	Council members							Current members
Political party	1994	1999	2003	2007	2011	2015	2019	Current members
Independent	11	6	8	7	6	7	19	27 / 42
Democratic	8	3	7	3	5	7	6	6 / 42
Civic	-	-	-	0	0	0	7	2 / 42
DAB	0	9	2	8	9	7	1	1 / 42
Labour	-	-	-	-	-	1	1	1 / 42
LSD	-	-	-	0	0	0	1	1 / 42
STCV	-	-	-	-	-	-	1	1 / 42
BPA	-	-	-	-	-	0	-	1 / 42

== District result maps ==
1994

1999

2003

2007

2011

2015

2019

== Members represented ==
Capacity	Code	Constituency	Name	Term		Political affiliation	Notes
Elected	R01	Sha Tin West	Chan Tan-tan	1 January 2024	Incumbent	DAB	
Elected	R01	Sha Tin West	Calvin Tang Siu-fung	1 January 2024	Incumbent	Independent	
Elected	R02	Sha Tin East	Yiu Ka-chun	1 January 2024	Incumbent	NPP/CF	
Elected	R02	Sha Tin East	Chu Wun-chiu	1 January 2024	Incumbent	DAB	
Elected	R03	Sha Tin South	Eddie Lam Yu-shing	1 January 2024	Incumbent	NPP/CF	
Elected	R03	Sha Tin South	Koo Wai-ping	1 January 2024	Incumbent	FTU	
Elected	R04	Sha Tin North	Choi Wai-shing	1 January 2024	Incumbent	DAB	
Elected	R04	Sha Tin North	Anna Law Yi-lam	1 January 2024	Incumbent	NPP/CF	
District Committees			Maisy Kung Mei-chi	1 January 2024	Incumbent	DAB	
District Committees			Ronald Yeung Ying-hon	1 January 2024	Incumbent	DAB	
District Committees			Ng Kai-tai	1 January 2024	Incumbent	DAB	
District Committees			Mok Hei-man	1 January 2024	Incumbent	DAB	
District Committees			Janet Lee Ching-yee	1 January 2024	Incumbent	FTU	
District Committees			Leung Ka-wai	1 January 2024	Incumbent	NPP/CF	
District Committees			Cheung Pak-yuen	1 January 2024	Incumbent	NPP/CF	
District Committees			Ha Kim-kwan	1 January 2024	Incumbent	NPP/CF	
District Committees			Celine Lam Yuk-wa	1 January 2024	Incumbent	Independent	
District Committees			Maverick Leung Chun-pong	1 January 2024	Incumbent	Independent	
District Committees			Chan Hiu-ying	1 January 2024	Incumbent	Independent	
District Committees			Karen Law Yuen-pui	1 January 2024	Incumbent	Independent	
District Committees			Guo Xuantong	1 January 2024	Incumbent	Independent	
District Committees			Jeff Lau Tak-wing	1 January 2024	Incumbent	Independent	
District Committees			Lam Siu-man	1 January 2024	Incumbent	Independent	
District Committees			Ada Lo Tai-suen	1 January 2024	Incumbent	Independent	
Appointed			Kelly Tung King-lei	1 January 2024	Incumbent	DAB	
Appointed			Roy Lam Kwong-kwan	1 January 2024	Incumbent	DAB	
Appointed			Chan Sin-ming	1 January 2024	Incumbent	FTU	
Appointed			Vincent Wong Wai-shin	1 January 2024	Incumbent	NPP	
Appointed			Leung Ka-fai	1 January 2024	Incumbent	NPP/CF	
Appointed			Chan Man-kuen	1 January 2024	Incumbent	NPP/CF	
Appointed			Michael Liu Tsz-chung	1 January 2024	Incumbent	NPP/CF	
Appointed			Pun Kwok-shan	1 January 2024	Incumbent	NPP/CF	
Appointed			Nancy Lam Chung-yan	1 January 2024	Incumbent	Civil Force	
Appointed			Michael Wong Yue-hon	1 January 2024	Incumbent	Civil Force	
Appointed			Paul Au Chi-on	1 January 2024	Incumbent	Independent	
Appointed			Wong King	1 January 2024	Incumbent	Independent	
Appointed			Wong Po-yee	1 January 2024	Incumbent	Independent	
Appointed			Tsoi Ming-yang	1 January 2024	Incumbent	Independent	
Appointed			Deng Kairong	1 January 2024	Incumbent	Independent	
Appointed			Cheng Ka-ho	1 January 2024	Incumbent	Independent	
Appointed			Scarlett Pong Oi-lan	1 January 2024	Incumbent	Independent	
Ex Officio		Sha Tin Rural Committee Chairman	Mok Kam-kwai	1 January 2024	Incumbent	BPA	

== Leadership ==
=== Chairs ===
Since 1985, the chairman is elected by all the members of the board:

Chairman	Years	Political Affiliation
P. H. Hase	1981–1982	District Officer
Donald Tsang Yam-kuen	1982–1984	District Officer
Paul Tang Kwok-wai	1984–1985	District Officer
Ng Chan-lam	1985–1991	Nonpartisan
Choy Kan-pui	1991–1999	United Democrat→Civil Force→PA
Wai Kwok-hung	2000–2011	Civil Force
Ho Hau-cheung	2012–2019	Civil Force→NPP/CF
Ching Cheung-ying	2020–2021	Democratic
Mak Yun- Pui	2021-2023	Independent

=== Vice Chairs ===
Vice Chairman	Years	Political Affiliation
Thomas Pang Cheung-wai	2000–2019	DAB
Wong Hok-lai	2020–2021	Community Sha Tin
Kelvin Sin Cheuk-nam	2021–2023	Democratic
