= Nam Cheong East (constituency) =

Constituency in Hong Kong

- Elected constituency for the Sham Shui Po District Council
- Boundary of Nam Cheong East in Sham Shui Po District
- District: Sham Shui Po
- Legislative Council constituency: Kowloon West
- Population: 19,594 (2019)
- Electorate: 7,082 (2019)

Current constituency
- Created: 1982 (first time); 2015 (second time)
- Number of members: One
- Member: Vacant
- Created from: Nam Cheong North; Nam Cheong South; Shek Kip Mei & Nam Cheong East; Nam Shan, Tai Hang Tung & Tai Hang Sai
- Replaced by: Nam Cheong North; Nam Cheong South; Shek Kip Mei & Nam Cheong East; Nam Shan, Tai Hang Tung & Tai Hang Sai

Nam Cheong East (Chinese: 南昌東) is one of the 25 constituencies in the Sham Shui Po District of Hong Kong which was first created in 1982 and recreated in 2015.

The constituency loosely covers Shek Kip Mei Estate with the estimated population of 19,594.

== Councillors represented ==
=== 1982 to 1985 ===
Election	Member	Party
1982	Ng Suen-cho	Civic Association

=== 1985 to 1994 ===
Election	First Member	First Party	Second Member	Second Party
1985	Liu Chi-keung	Civic Association	Cheng Kam-wah	Civic Association
1991	Leung Lai	ADPL	Cheng Kam-wah	Civic Association

=== 1994 to present ===
Election	Member	Party
1994	Leung Lai	ADPL
2007	Constituency abolished	
2015	Kalvin Ho Kai-ming→Vacant (Note: Resigned on 10 July 2021 after being arrested under national security law.)	ADPL

== Election results ==
=== 2010s ===
Sham Shui Po District Council Election, 2019: Nam Cheong East
Party	Candidate	Votes	%	±%
ADPL	Kalvin Ho Kai-ming	2,996	60.99	+3.69
DAB	Chan Lung-kit	1,916	39.01	−3.69
Majority		1,080	21.98	
Turnout		4,922	69.53	
ADPL hold		Swing		

Sham Shui Po District Council Election, 2015: Nam Cheong East
Party	Candidate	Votes	%	±%
ADPL	Kalvin Ho Kai-ming	1,727	57.3	
DAB	Miu Hoi-ming	1,287	42.7	
Majority		440	14.6	
Turnout		3,047	48.8	
ADPL win (new seat)				

=== 2000s ===
Sham Shui Po District Council Election, 2003: Nam Cheong East
Party	Candidate	Votes	%	±%
ADPL	Leung Lai	1,719	77.64	+8.28
DAB	Merril Mok Wai-leung	495	22.36	N/A
Majority		1,224	55.28	+16.56
ADPL hold		Swing	N/A	

=== 1990s ===
Sham Shui Po District Council Election, 1999: Nam Cheong East
Party	Candidate	Votes	%	±%
ADPL	Leung Lai	1,297	69.36	–8.61
Democratic	Li Siu-kei	573	30.64	
Majority		724	38.72	–17.21
ADPL hold		Swing	N/A	

Sham Shui Po District Board Election, 1994: Nam Cheong East
Party	Candidate	Votes	%	±%
ADPL	Leung Lai	1,143	77.97	+4.33
Nonpartisan	Cheung Sang	323	22.03	N/A
Majority		820	55.93	N/A
ADPL hold		Swing	N/A	

Sham Shui Po District Board Election, 1991: Nam Cheong East
Party	Candidate	Votes	%	±%
ADPL	Leung Lai	1,355	38.43	N/A
Civic	Cheng Kam-wah	1,095	31.05	–3.46
Civic	Liu Chi-keung	1,076	30.52	–3.79
ADPL gain from Civic		Swing		
Civic hold		Swing		

=== 1980s ===
Sham Shui Po District Board Election, 1988: Nam Cheong East
Party	Candidate	Votes	%	±%
Nonpartisan	Liu Chi-keung	1,098	29.37	
Nonpartisan	Cheng Kam-wah	1,031	27.58	
Nonpartisan	Lau Long-ming	886	23.70	
Nonpartisan	Chan Wai-lun	723	19.34	
Nonpartisan hold		Swing	N/A	
Nonpartisan hold		Swing	N/A	

Sham Shui Po District Board Election, 1985: Nam Cheong East
Party	Candidate	Votes	%	±%
Civic	Liu Chi-keung	uncontested		
Civic	Cheng Kam-wah	uncontested		
Civic hold		Swing	N/A	
Civic hold		Swing	N/A	

Sham Shui Po District Board Election, 1982: Nam Cheong East
Party	Candidate	Votes	%	±%
Civic	Ng Suen-cho	uncontested		
Civic win (new seat)				
