= Daniel Wong Kwok-tung =

Hong Kong lawyer and politician

- 黃國桐
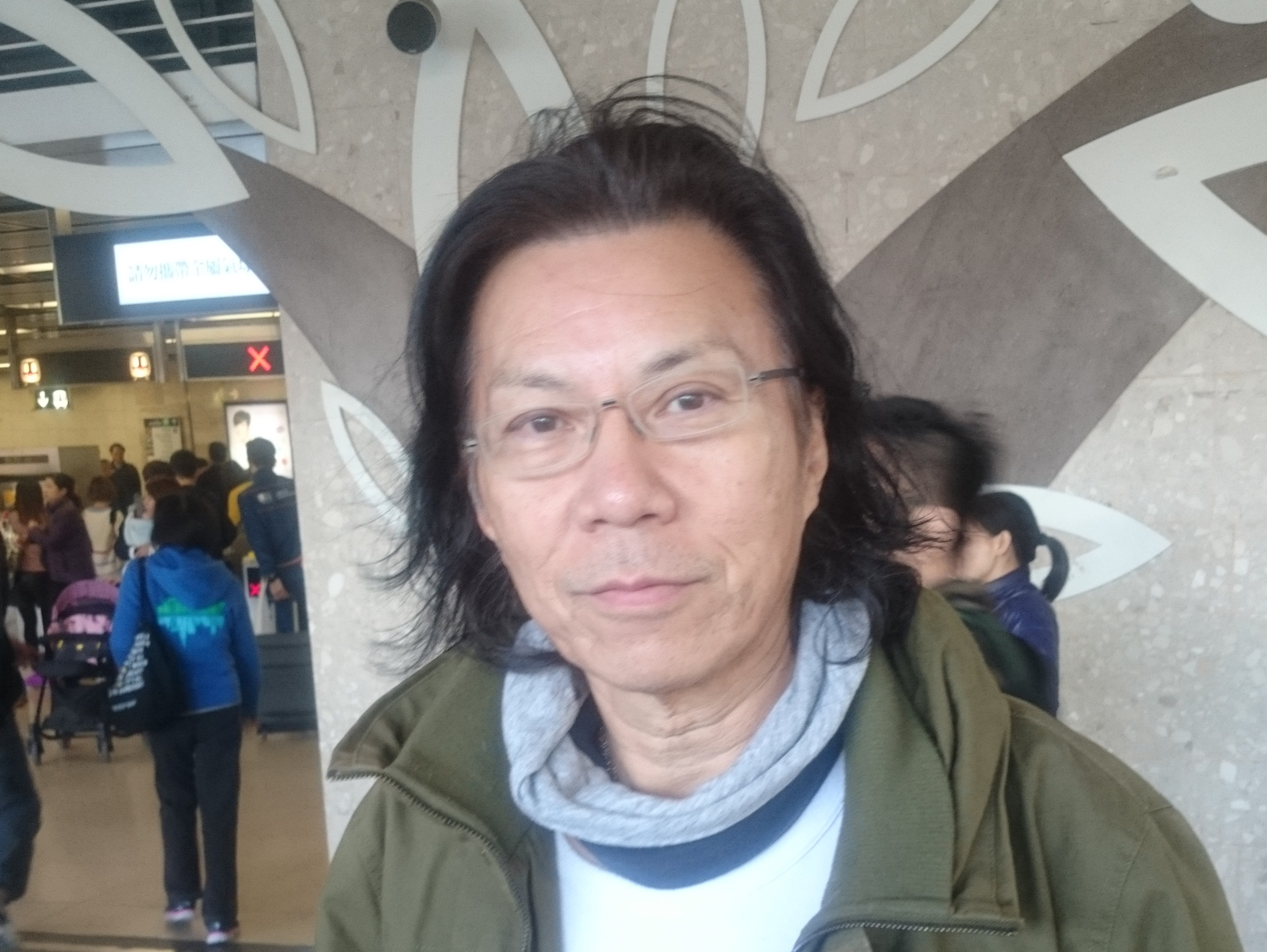

Member of the Urban Council
- In office 1 April 1989 – 31 December 1999
- Preceded by: Kwan Lim-ho
- Succeeded by: Council abolished
- Constituency: Yau Tsim

Member of the Kowloon City District Council
- In office 1 January 2020 – 31 December 2023
- Preceded by: Ting Kin-wa
- Succeeded by: Constituency abolished
- Constituency: Prince

Member of the Wong Tai Sin District Council
- In office 1 January 2004 – 31 December 2015
- Preceded by: Lo Siu-wah
- Succeeded by: Timothy Choy
- Constituency: Choi Wan East

Member of the Yau Tsim District Board
- In office 1 April 1988 – 31 March 1991
- Preceded by: Kwan Miu-mei
- Succeeded by: Kwan Miu-mei
- Constituency: Yau Ma Tei North

Personal details
- Born: 28 July 1949 (age 76) British Hong Kong
- Party: Democratic Party
- Other political affiliations: ADPL (1990s); The Frontier (early 2000s); LSD (2006–10s)
- Education: National Taiwan University (LLB)
- Profession: Solicitor

Daniel Wong Kwok-tung (Chinese: 黃國桐; born 28 July 1949) is a Hong Kong lawyer and politician. He is a former member of the Kowloon City District Council for Prince constituency. Prior to that, he had been elected member of the Yau Tsim District Board, Urban Council and Wong Tai Sin District Council. He is a current member of the Democratic Party, before that he was a member of the Hong Kong Association for Democracy and People's Livelihood (ADPL), The Frontier and the League of Social Democrats (LSD).

== Biography ==
Wong was born in 1949 and was educated at the National Taiwan University in Taiwan. He first contested in the 1988 District Board election where he won a seat in the Yau Tsim District Board for Yau Ma Tei North. He went on and won a seat in Urban Council, representing Yau Tsim in the 1989 Urban Council election, where he served through the transfer of sovereignty over Hong Kong until the abolishment of the Provisional Urban Council in 1999.

During the time, Wong joined the pro-democratic Hong Kong Association for Democracy and People's Livelihood (ADPL) and unsuccessfully challenged Frederick Fung's chairmanship in 1995, in which he and his supporters accused of Fung for taking the position of Hong Kong Affairs Advisers from the Beijing government. Wong also ran in the 1995 Legislative Council election but was defeated by James To of the Democratic Party.

Wong later quit the ADPL and joined the more radical The Frontier. He ran in the 2003 District Council election and was elected to the Wong Tai Sin District Council through Choi Wan East. He held onto the seat until he was defeated by Timothy Choy Tsz-kin of the Democratic Alliance for the Betterment and Progress of Hong Kong (DAB) in 2015. During that time, Wong became the founding member of the League of Social Democrats (LSD) but later switched to the Democratic Party.

In the 2019–20 Hong Kong protests, Wong volunteered for giving legal assistance to hundreds of arrested protesters. In the 2019 District Council election, Wong campaigned for District Councillor for the third time, running in Prince of the Kowloon City District Council. He defeated pro-Beijing incumbent Ting Kin-wa with a margin of 293 votes.

== Notes ==
Political offices
Preceded by Kwan Miu-mei	Member of Yau Tsim District Board; Representative for Yau Ma Tei North; 1988–1991; With: Lai Wing-tak	Succeeded by Kwan Miu-mei
Preceded by Kwan Lim-ho	Member of Urban Council; Representative for Yau Tsim; 1989–1999	Council abolished
Preceded by Lo Siu-wah	Member of Wong Tai Sin District Council; Representative for Choi Wan East; 2004–2015	Succeeded by Timothy Choy
Preceded by Tin Kin-wa	Member of Kowloon City District Council; Representative for Prince; 2020–2023	Succeeded by Constituency abolished
