= Ha Pak Tin (constituency) =

Hong Kong constituency

- Elected constituency for the Sham Shui Po District Council
- Boundary of Ha Pak Tin in Sham Shui Po District
- District: Sham Shui Po
- Legislative Council constituency: Kowloon West
- Population: 16,014 (2019)
- Electorate: 8,321 (2019)

Current constituency
- Created: 2007
- Number of members: One
- Member: Vacant

Ha Pak Tin (Chinese: 下白田), formerly called Pak Tin, is one of the 25 constituencies in the Sham Shui Po District of Hong Kong which was created in 2007.

The constituency loosely covers Pak Tin Estate in Shek Kip Mei with the estimated population of 16,014.

== Councillors represented ==
=== Pak Tin (1982–1985) ===
| Election | Member | Party |
|---|---|---|
| 1982 | Ha Siu-kwong | Independent |

=== Pak Tin (1985–1994) ===
| Election | First Member | First Party | Second Member | Second Party |
|---|---|---|---|---|
| 1985 | Tam Kwok-kiu | Independent | Ha Siu-kwong | Reform |
| 1986 | Tam Kwok-kiu | ADPL | Ha Siu-kwong | Reform |
| 1991 | Tam Kwok-kiu | ADPL | Cheng Hok-chit | ADPL |

=== Pak Tin (1994–2007) ===
| Election | Member | Party |
|---|---|---|
| 1994 | Yan Kai-wing | ADPL |
| 200? | Yan Kai-wing | Independent |

=== Ha Pak Tin (2007–present) ===
| Election | Member | Party |
|---|---|---|
| 2007 | Yan Kai-wing→Vacant | Independent |
| 2013 | Yan Kai-wing→Vacant | BPA/KWND |
| 2018 | Yan Kai-wing→Vacant | Independent |

== Election results ==
=== 2010s ===
Sham Shui Po District Council Election, 2019: Ha Pak Tin
| Party | Candidate | Votes | % | ±% |
|---|---|---|---|---|
| Nonpartisan | Yan Kai-wing | 3,206 | 56.89 | −9.93 |
| DAB (FTU) | Raymond Lam Wai-man | 1,952 | 34.64 | |
| Nonpartisan | Fong Chi-lung | 436 | 7.74 | |
| Ind. democrat | Chan Chak-shing | 41 | 0.73 | |
| Majority | | 1,254 | 22.25 | |
| Turnout | | 5,654 | 67.98 | |
| Nonpartisan hold | | Swing | | |

Sham Shui Po District Council Election, 2015: Ha Pak Tin
| Party | Candidate | Votes | % | ±% |
|---|---|---|---|---|
| BPA (KWND) | Yan Kai-wing | 2,320 | 66.82 | −5.25 |
| Socialist Action | Sally Tang Mei-ching | 1,152 | 33.18 | |
| Majority | | 1,168 | 33.64 | |
| Turnout | | 3,472 | 45.40 | |
| BPA hold | | Swing | | |

Sham Shui Po District Council Election, 2011: Ha Pak Tin
| Party | Candidate | Votes | % | ±% |
|---|---|---|---|---|
| Independent | Yan Kai-wing | 2,888 | 72.07 | |
| ADPL | Yeung Yuk | 1,119 | 27.93 | |
| Majority | | 1,769 | 44.14 | |
| Turnout | | 4,007 | 44.28 | |
| Independent hold | | Swing | | |

=== 2000s ===
Sham Shui Po District Council Election, 2007: Ha Pak Tin
| Party | Candidate | Votes | % | ±% |
|---|---|---|---|---|
| Independent | Yan Kai-wing | Uncontested | | |
| Independent hold | | Swing | | |

Sham Shui Po District Council Election, 2003: Pak Tin
| Party | Candidate | Votes | % | ±% |
|---|---|---|---|---|
| ADPL | Yan Kai-wing | Uncontested | | |
| ADPL hold | | Swing | | |

=== 1990s ===
Sham Shui Po District Council Election, 1999: Pak Tin
| Party | Candidate | Votes | % | ±% |
|---|---|---|---|---|
| ADPL | Yan Kai-wing | 2,690 | 73.60 | +7.17 |
| DAB | Wong Wai-chuen | 965 | 26.40 | |
| Majority | | 1,725 | 47.20 | |
| ADPL hold | | Swing | | |

Sham Shui Po District Board Election, 1994: Pak Tin
| Party | Candidate | Votes | % | ±% |
|---|---|---|---|---|
| ADPL | Yan Kai-wing | 1,537 | 65.43 | |
| LDF | Lui Pak-yiu | 812 | 34.57 | |
| Majority | | 725 | 30.86 | |
| ADPL hold | | Swing | | |

Sham Shui Po District Board Election, 1991: Pak Tin
| Party | Candidate | Votes | % | ±% |
|---|---|---|---|---|
| ADPL | Tam Kwok-kiu | 2,343 | 41.64 | +6.09 |
| ADPL | Cheng Hok-chit | 1,880 | 33.41 | |
| Nonpartisan | Lui Pak-yiu | 1,404 | 24.95 | |
| ADPL hold | | Swing | | |
| ADPL hold | | Swing | | |

=== 1980s ===
Sham Shui Po District Board Election, 1988: Pak Tin
| Party | Candidate | Votes | % | ±% |
|---|---|---|---|---|
| ADPL | Tam Kwok-kiu | 2,229 | 35.55 | −19.44 |
| Reform | Ha Siu-kwong | 1,713 | 27.32 | −1.69 |
| ADPL | Sa Mei-ching | 1,670 | 26.63 | |
| Nonpartisan | Lee Shek-po | 658 | 10.49 | |
| ADPL hold | | Swing | | |
| Reform hold | | Swing | | |

Sham Shui Po District Board Election, 1985: Pak Tin
| Party | Candidate | Votes | % | ±% |
|---|---|---|---|---|
| Nonpartisan | Tam Kwok-kiu | 4,296 | 54.99 | |
| Reform | Ha Siu-kwong | 2,266 | 29.01 | |
| Nonpartisan | Lui Leung-ho | 743 | 9.51 | |
| Nonpartisan | Lee Yan-chi | 507 | 6.49 | |
| Nonpartisan win (new seat) | | | | |
| Reform hold | | Swing | | |

Sham Shui Po District Board Election, 1982: Pak Tin
| Party | Candidate | Votes | % | ±% |
|---|---|---|---|---|
| Nonpartisan | Ha Siu-kwong | 1,293 | 37.19 | |
| Nonpartisan | Lee Yan-chi | 851 | 24.48 | |
| Reform | Yau Ling | 776 | 22.32 | |
| Civic | Lin Wing-mau | 557 | 16.02 | |
| Nonpartisan win (new seat) | | | | |
