= 1998 Hong Kong legislative election in Kowloon West =

- 24 May 1998

All 3 Kowloon West seats to the Legislative Council
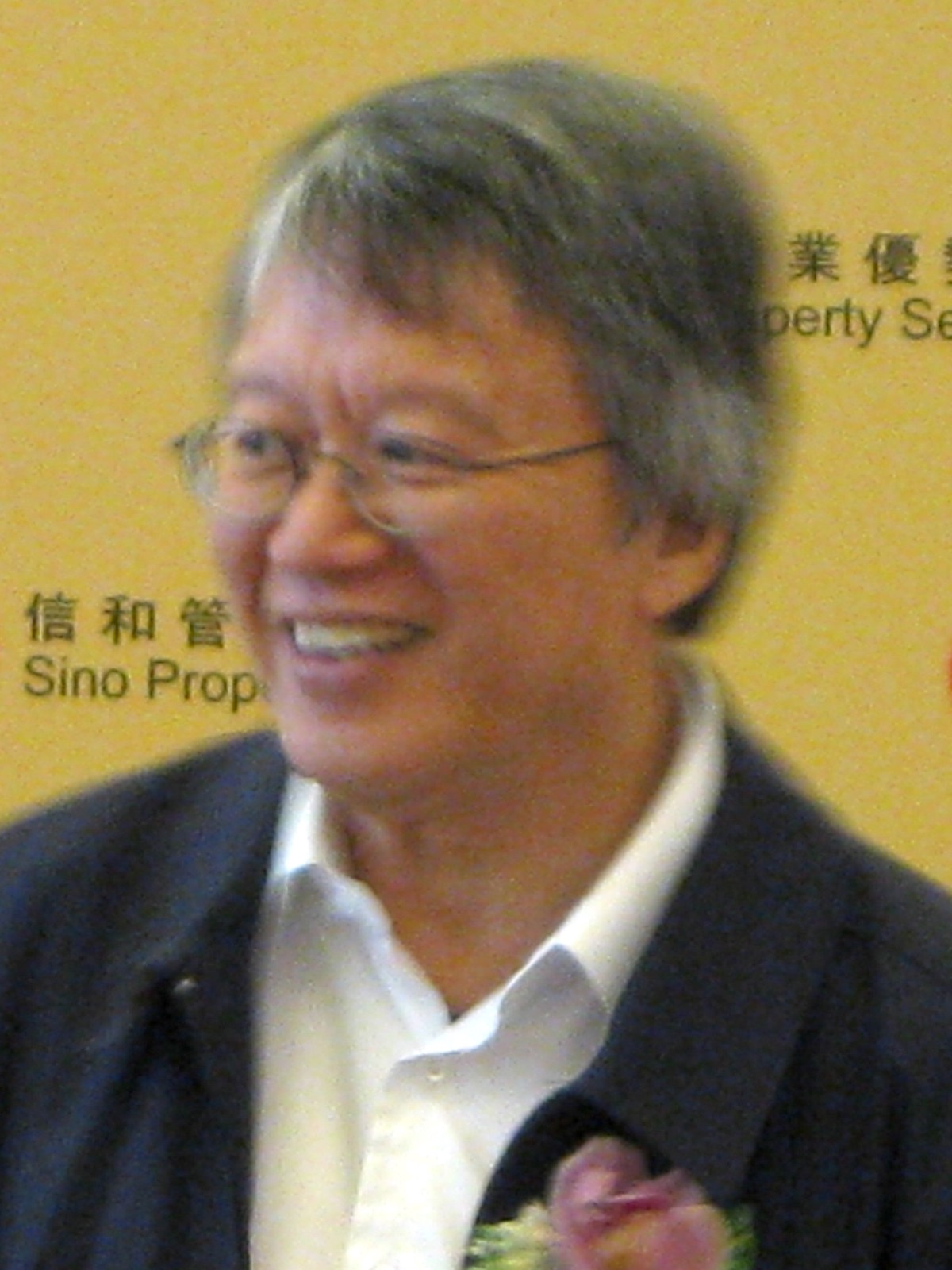

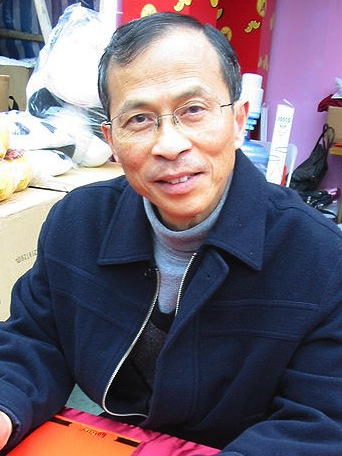
	First party	Second party
Leader	Lau Chin-shek	Jasper Tsang
Party	Democratic	DAB
Alliance	Pro-democracy camp	Pro-Beijing camp
Seats won	2	1
Popular vote	113,079	44,632
Percentage	55.1%	21.7%

These are the Kowloon West results of the 1998 Hong Kong legislative election. The election was held on 24 May 1998 and all 3 seats in Kowloon West where consisted of Yau Tsim Mong District, Sham Shui Po District and Kowloon City District were contested. The Democratic Party's Lau Chin-shek and James To won two seats and was followed by Jasper Tsang of the Democratic Alliance for the Betterment of Hong Kong. Frederick Fung of the Association for Democracy and People's Livelihood was defeated and ousted from the legislature.

== Overall results ==
After election:

↓
2	1
Pro-democracy	Pro-Beijing

Party	Seats	Contesting list(s)	Votes	%
Democratic	2	1	113,079	55.1
ADPL	0	1	39,534	19.3
Pro-democracy camp	2	2	152,613	74.3
DAB	1	1	44,632	21.7
Liberal	0	1	5,854	2.9
Pro-Beijing camp	1	2	50,485	24.6
Independent	0	1	2,302	1.1
Turnout:			205,401	50.2

== Candidates list ==
Legislative Election 1998: Kowloon West
List	Candidates	Votes	Of total (%)	± from prev.
Democratic	Lau Chin-shek, James To Kun-sun Eric Wong Chong-ki	113,079	55.05 (33.33+21.72)	
DAB	Jasper Tsang Yok-sing Ip Kwok-chung, Wen Choy-bon	44,632	21.73	
ADPL	Frederick Fung Kin-kee, Liu Sing-lee, Tam Kwok-kiu	39,534	19.25	
Liberal	Ringo Chiang Sai-cheong, Chan Noi-yue, Edward Li King-wah	5,854	2.85	
Atlas Alliance	Helen Chung Yee-fong	2,302	1.12	
Total valid votes		205,401	100.00	
Rejected ballots		1,281		
Turnout		206,682	50.23	
Registered electors		411,468		

== See also ==
- Legislative Council of Hong Kong
- Hong Kong legislative elections
- 1998 Hong Kong legislative election
