= Shek Kip Mei (constituency) =

- Elected constituency for the Sham Shui Po District Council
- Boundary of Shek Kip Mei in Sham Shui Po District
- District: Sham Shui Po
- Legislative Council constituency: Kowloon West
- Population: 19,039 (2019)
- Electorate: 9,476 (2019)

Current constituency
- Created: 1982 (first time); 2015 (second time)
- Number of members: One
- Member: Vacant
- Created from: Shek Kip Mei & Nam Cheong East
- Replaced by: Shek Kip Mei & Nam Cheong East

Shek Kip Mei (Chinese: 石硤尾) is one of the 25 constituencies in the Sham Shui Po District of Hong Kong which was first created in 1982 and recreated in 2015.

The constituency loosely covers Shek Kip Mei Estate with the estimated population of 19,039.

== Councillors represented ==
Election	Member	Party
1982	Fan Kin-keung	Nonpartisan
1985	Chan Ka-chung	Civic Association
1988	Frederick Fung Kin-kee	ADPL
1991	Foo Wai-lok	ADPL
1999	Frederick Fung Kin-kee	ADPL
2003	Tam Kwok-kiu	ADPL
2007	Constituency abolished	
2015	Chan Kwok-wai	KWND
2019	Jeffrey Sin Kam-ho	Nonpartisan

== Election results ==
=== 2010s ===
Sham Shui Po District Council Election, 2019: Shek Kip Mei
Party	Candidate	Votes	%	±%
Nonpartisan	Jeffrey Sin Kam-ho	3,235	50.08	
BPA (KWND)	Chan Kwok-wai	3,225	49.92	−7.78
Majority		10	0.16	
Turnout		6,491	68.56	
Nonpartisan gain from BPA		Swing		

Sham Shui Po District Council Election, 2015: Shek Kip Mei
Party	Candidate	Votes	%	±%
KWND	Chan Kwok-wai	2,847	57.7	
ADPL	Tsung Po-shan	2,088	42.3	
Majority		759	15.4	
Turnout		4,983	49.5	
KWND win (new seat)				

=== 2000s ===
Sham Shui Po District Council Election, 2003: Shek Kip Mei
Party	Candidate	Votes	%	±%
ADPL	Tam Kwok-kiu	1,893	64.87	N/A
Frontier	Foo Wai-lok	1,025	35.13	N/A
Majority		868	29.75	N/A
ADPL hold		Swing	N/A	

=== 1990s ===
Sham Shui Po District Council Election, 1999: Shek Kip Mei
Party	Candidate	Votes	%	±%
ADPL	Frederick Fung Kin-kee	uncontested		
ADPL hold		Swing	N/A	

Sham Shui Po District Board Election, 1994: Shek Kip Mei
Party	Candidate	Votes	%	±%
ADPL	Foo Wai-lok	2,238	73.64	+7.95
Nonpartisan	Sin Po-kan	801	26.38	N/A
Majority		1,437	47.29	N/A
ADPL hold		Swing	N/A	

Sham Shui Po District Board Election, 1991: Shek Kip Mei
Party	Candidate	Votes	%	±%
ADPL	Foo Wai-lok	2,127	65.69	+3.15
Civic	Ng Ping-sum	1,111	34.31	–3.15
Majority		1,016	31.38	+6.29
ADPL hold		Swing	+3.15	

=== 1980s ===
Sham Shui Po District Board Election, 1988: Shek Kip Mei
Party	Candidate	Votes	%	±%
ADPL	Frederick Fung Kin-kee	2,371	62.54	
Civic	Chan Ka-chung	1,420	37.46	
Majority		951	25.09	
ADPL gain from Civic		Swing	N/A	

Sham Shui Po District Board Election, 1985: Shek Kip Mei
Party	Candidate	Votes	%	±%
Civic	Chan Ka-chung	uncontested		
Civic gain from Nonpartisan		Swing	(new)	

Sham Shui Po District Board Election, 1982: Shek Kip Mei
Party	Candidate	Votes	%	±%
Nonpartisan	Fan Kin-keung	2,972	79.96	
Nonpartisan	Wan Ho-kan	745	20.04	
Majority		2,227	59.91	
Nonpartisan win (new seat)				
