= Lung Ping & Sheung Pak Tin (constituency) =

Hong Kong constituency

- Elected constituency for the Sham Shui Po District Council
- Boundary of Lung Ping & Sheung Pak Tin in Sham Shui Po District
- District: Sham Shui Po
- Legislative Council constituency: Kowloon West
- Population: 15,802 (2019)
- Electorate: 8,283 (2019)

Current constituency
- Created: 2007
- Number of members: One
- Member: Carmen Ng Mei (Independent)

Lung Ping & Sheung Pak Tin (Chinese: 龍坪及上白田), formerly called Chak On and Lung Ping, is one of the 25 constituencies in the Sham Shui Po District of Hong Kong which was created in 2007.

The constituency loosely covers Tai Wo Ping in Shek Kip Mei with the estimated population of 15,802.

== Councillors represented ==
=== Chak On (1994–2003) ===
| Election | Member | Party |
|---|---|---|
| 1994 | Tam Kwok-kiu | ADPL |

=== Lung Ping (2003–2007) ===
| Election | Member | Party |
|---|---|---|
| 2003 | Carmen Ng Mei | ADPL |

=== Lung Ping & Sheung Pak Tin (2007–present) ===
| Election | Member | Party |
|---|---|---|
| 2007 | Carmen Ng Mei | ADPL |
| 2021 | Carmen Ng Mei | Independent |

== Election results ==
=== 2010s ===
Sham Shui Po District Council Election, 2019: Lung Ping & Sheung Pak Tin
| Party | Candidate | Votes | % | ±% |
|---|---|---|---|---|
| Nonpartisan | Carmen Ng Mei | 4,031 | 70.58 | +13.42 |
| KWND | Law Kwok-ho | 1,680 | 29.42 | |
| Majority | | 2,351 | 41.16 | |
| Turnout | | 5,730 | 69.26 | |
| Nonpartisan hold | | Swing | | |

Sham Shui Po District Council Election, 2015: Lung Ping & Sheung Pak Tin
| Party | Candidate | Votes | % | ±% |
|---|---|---|---|---|
| ADPL | Carmen Ng Mei | 2,454 | 57.16 | −4.27 |
| FTU | Raymond Lam Wai-man | 1,678 | 39.09 | |
| Nonpartisan | Cheng Chi-hong | 161 | 3.75 | |
| Majority | | 776 | 18.17 | |
| Turnout | | 4,293 | 52.55 | |
| ADPL hold | | Swing | | |

Sham Shui Po District Council Election, 2011: Lung Ping & Sheung Pak Tin
| Party | Candidate | Votes | % | ±% |
|---|---|---|---|---|
| ADPL | Carmen Ng Mei | 2,120 | 61.43 | −11.58 |
| Liberal | Chan Kin-yip | 687 | 19.91 | |
| People Power | Cheung Pun-chiu | 644 | 18.66 | |
| Majority | | 1,433 | 41.52 | |
| Turnout | | 3,451 | 40.66 | |
| ADPL hold | | Swing | | |

=== 2000s ===
Sham Shui Po District Council Election, 2007: Lung Ping & Sheung Pak Tin
| Party | Candidate | Votes | % | ±% |
|---|---|---|---|---|
| ADPL | Carmen Ng Mei | 1,845 | 73.01 | +1.23 |
| Independent | Li Kwok-chu | 682 | 26.99 | |
| Majority | | 1,263 | 46.02 | |
| ADPL hold | | Swing | | |

Sham Shui Po District Council Election, 2003: Lung Ping
| Party | Candidate | Votes | % | ±% |
|---|---|---|---|---|
| ADPL | Carmen Ng Mei | 1,722 | 71.78 | −14.56 |
| Liberal | Ng Ka-chun | 677 | 28.22 | |
| Majority | | 1,045 | 58.12 | |
| ADPL hold | | Swing | | |

=== 1990s ===
Sham Shui Po District Council Election, 1999: Chak On
| Party | Candidate | Votes | % | ±% |
|---|---|---|---|---|
| ADPL | Tam Kwok-kiu | 1,548 | 86.34 | |
| Democratic | Jocelyn Carman Lau | 245 | 13.66 | |
| Majority | | 1,303 | 72.68 | |
| ADPL hold | | Swing | | |

Sham Shui Po District Board Election, 1994: Chak On
| Party | Candidate | Votes | % | ±% |
|---|---|---|---|---|
| ADPL | Tam Kwok-kiu | Uncontested | | |
| ADPL win (new seat) | | | | |
