= Yau Ma Tei North (constituency) =

- Elected constituency for the Yau Tsim Mong District Council
- Boundary of Yau Ma Tei North in Yau Tsim Mong District
- District: Yau Tsim (1982–1994); Yau Tsim Mong (1994–present)
- Legislative Council constituency: Kowloon West
- Population: 12,823 (2019)
- Electorate: 5,644 (2019)

Current constituency
- Created: 1982 (first time); 2015 (second time)
- Number of members: One
- Member: Lam Kin-man (Independent)
- Created from: King's Park; Mong Kok West

Yau Ma Tei North (Chinese: 油麻地北) is one of the 19 constituencies in the Yau Tsim Mong District of Hong Kong which was first created in 1982 and recreated in 2015.

The constituency loosely covers Yau Ma Tei with the estimated population of 12,817.

== Councillors represented ==
=== 1982–85 ===
Election	Member	Party
1982	Chan Yam-tong	Civic Association

=== 1985–94 ===
Election	First Member	First Party	Second Member	Second Party
1985	Kwan Miu-mei	Reform Club	Lai Wing-tak	Nonpartisan
1988	Wong Kwok-tung	Nonpartisan	Lai Wing-tak	Nonpartisan
1991	Kwan Miu-mei	Nonpartisan	Lai Wing-tak	Nonpartisan

=== 2015 to present ===
Election	Member	Party
2015	Lam Kin-man	ADPL
2017	Lam Kin-man	Independent democrat

== Election results ==
=== 2010s ===
Yau Tsim Mong District Council Election, 2019: Yau Ma Tei North
Party	Candidate	Votes	%	±%
Ind. democrat	Lam Kin-man	2,573	67.43	−3.47
Independent	Lee Man-kit	1,243	32.57	
Majority		1,330	34.86	
Turnout		3,831	67.89	
Ind. democrat hold		Swing		

Yau Tsim Mong District Council Election, 2015: Yau Ma Tei North
Party	Candidate	Votes	%	±%
ADPL	Lam Kin-man	1,682	70.9	
FTU	Man Yun-wa	689	29.1	
Majority		993	41.8	
Turnout		2,406	46.5	
ADPL win (new seat)				

=== 1990s ===
Yau Tsim District Board Election, 1991: Yau Ma Tei North
Party	Candidate	Votes	%	±%
Nonpartisan	Lai Wing-tak	uncontested		
Nonpartisan	Kwan Miu-mei	uncontested		
Nonpartisan hold		Swing	N/A	
Nonpartisan gain from Nonpartisan		Swing	N/A	

=== 1980s ===
Yau Tsim District Board Election, 1988: Yau Ma Tei North
Party	Candidate	Votes	%	±%
Nonpartisan	Wong Kwok-tung	1,457	39.25	
Nonpartisan	Lai Wing-tak	1,166	31.41	+2.43
Reform	Kwan Miu-mei	1,089	29.33	–12.81
Nonpartisan gain from Reform		Swing	N/A	
Nonpartisan hold		Swing	N/A	

Yau Tsim District Board Election, 1985: Yau Ma Tei North
Party	Candidate	Votes	%	±%
Reform	Kwan Miu-mei	1,507	42.14	
Nonpartisan	Lai Wing-tak	1,067	29.84	
Civic	Chan Yam-tong	1,002	28.02	–55.29
Reform gain from Civic		Swing	N/A	
Nonpartisan win (new seat)				

Yau Tsim District Board Election, 1982: Yau Ma Tei North
Party	Candidate	Votes	%	±%
Civic	Chan Yam-tong	1,572	83.31	
Nonpartisan	Leung Fun	315	16.69	
Majority		1,257	66.61	
Civic win (new seat)				
