= 2000 Hong Kong legislative election in Kowloon West =

- 10 September 2000

All 4 Kowloon West seats to the Legislative Council
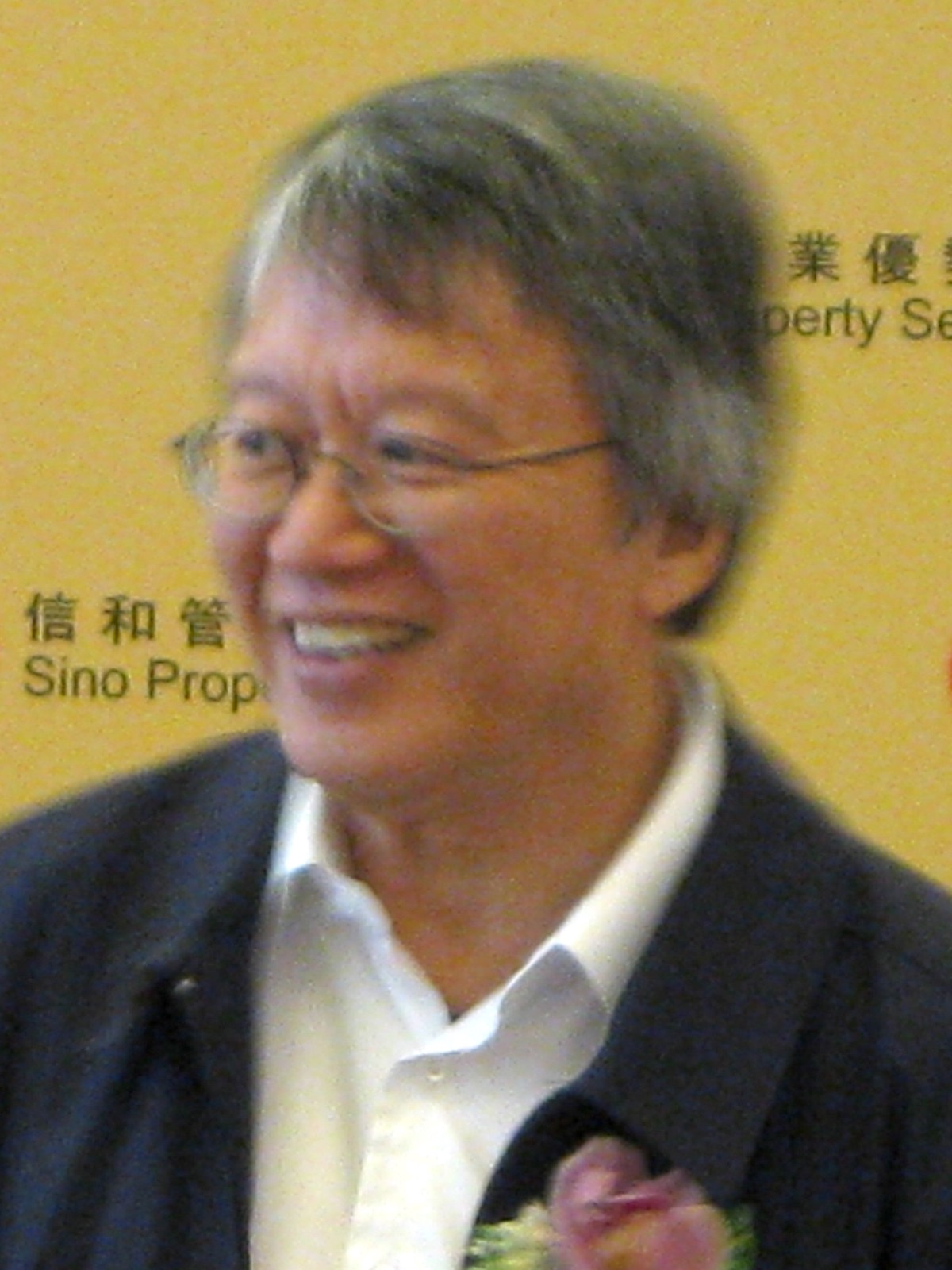

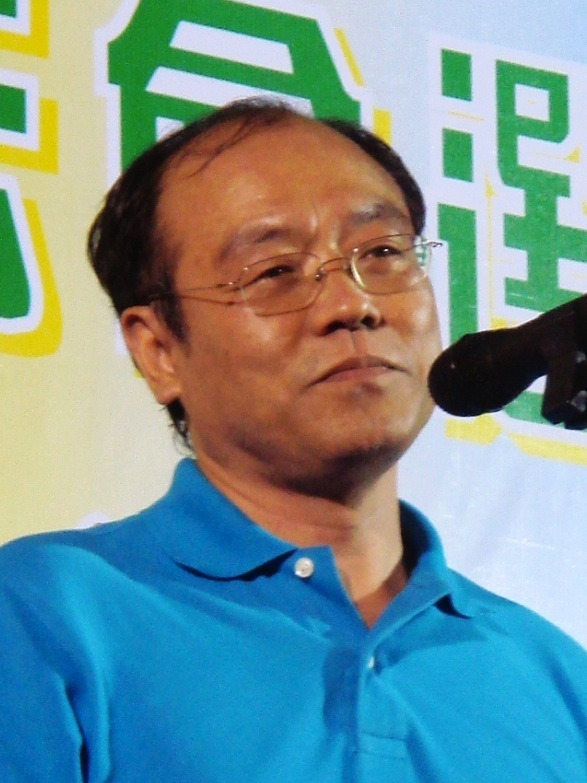

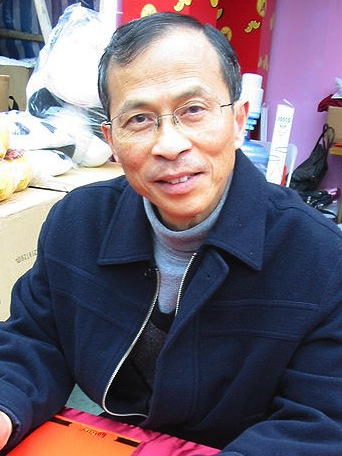
	First party	Second party	Third party
Leader	Lau Chin-shek	Frederick Fung	Jasper Tsang
Party	Democratic	ADPL	DAB
Alliance	Pro-democracy camp	Pro-democracy camp	Pro-Beijing camp
Last election	2 seats, 55.1%	0 seat, 19.3%	1 seat, 21.7%
Seats before	2	0	1
Seats won	2	1	1
Seat change	Steady	▲1	Steady
Popular vote	73,540	62,717	41,942
Percentage	41.3%	35.2%	23.5
Swing	▼13.8%	▲16.0%	▲1.8%

These are the Kowloon West results of the 2000 Hong Kong legislative election. The election was held on 10 September 2000 and all 4 seats in Kowloon West where consisted of Yau Tsim Mong District, Sham Shui Po District and Kowloon City District were contested. All three incumbents were re-elected, with Frederick Fung regained a seat for the Association for Democracy and People's Livelihood.

== Overall results ==
Before election:

↓
2	1
Pro-democracy	Pro-Beijing

Change in composition:

↓
3	1
Pro-democracy	Pro-Beijing

Party	Seats	Seats change	Contesting list(s)	Votes	%	% change
Democratic	2	0	1	73,540	41.3	–13.8
ADPL	1	+1	1	62,717	35.9	+16.0
Pro-democracy camp	3	+1	2	136,257	76.5	+2.2
DAB	1	0	1	41,942	23.5	+1.8
Pro-Beijing camp	1	0	1	41,942	23.5	+1.8
Turnout:				178,199	42.1	

== Candidates list ==
Legislative Election 2000: Kowloon West
List	Candidates	Votes	Of total (%)	± from prev.
Democratic (CTU)	Lau Chin-shek, James To Kun-sun	73,540	41.3 (25+16.27)	−13.75
ADPL	Frederick Fung Kin-kee Liu Sing-lee	62,717	35.2 (25+10.2)	+15.95
DAB	Jasper Tsang Yok-sing Chung Kong-mo, Pun Kwok-wah, Wong Wai-chuen	41,942	23.5	+1.77
Total valid votes		178,199	100.00	
Rejected ballots		1,447		
Turnout		179,646	42.14	–9.09
Registered electors		426,288		

== See also ==
- Legislative Council of Hong Kong
- Hong Kong legislative elections
- 2000 Hong Kong legislative election
