= Nam Cheong North (constituency) =

Hong Kong constituency

- Elected constituency for the Sham Shui Po District Council
- Boundary of Nam Cheong North in Sham Shui Po District
- District: Sham Shui Po
- Legislative Council constituency: Kowloon West
- Population: 19,628 (2019)
- Electorate: 5,738 (2019)

Current constituency
- Created: 1985
- Number of members: One
- Member: Vacant

Nam Cheong North (Chinese: 南昌北) is one of the 25 constituencies in the Sham Shui Po District of Hong Kong which was first created in 1985.

The constituency loosely covers Sham Shui Po with the estimated population of 19,628.

== Councillors represented ==
Election	Member	Party
1985	Raymond Choy Wai-shek	Independent
1988	Raymond Choy Wai-shek	Independent→LDF
1991	Raymond Choy Wai-shek	LDF→Independent
1994	Raymond Choy Wai-shek	Independent
1999	Leung Hon-wa	123DA
2003	Leung Hon-wa	Independent→Democratic Alliance
2007	Vincent Cheng Wing-shun	DAB
2011	Vincent Cheng Wing-shun	DAB
2015	Vincent Cheng Wing-shun	DAB
2019	Lao Ka-hang	Civic→Independent

== Election results ==
=== 2010s ===
Sham Shui Po District Council Election, 2019: Nam Cheong North
Party	Candidate	Votes	%	±%
Civic	Lao Ka-hang	2,193	54.89	
DAB	Vincent Cheng Wing-shun	1,747	43.73	−20.97
Nonpartisan	Wong Hiu-shing	55	1.38	
Majority		446	11.16	
Turnout		4,009	69.89	
Civic gain from DAB		Swing		

Sham Shui Po District Council Election, 2015: Nam Cheong North
Party	Candidate	Votes	%	±%
DAB	Vincent Cheng Wing-shun	1,461	64.7	+13.4
People Power	Jordan Chan Wing-fai	796	35.3	+25.8
Majority		665	31.4	
Turnout		2,257	39.5	
DAB hold		Swing		

Sham Shui Po District Council Election, 2011: Nam Cheong North
Party	Candidate	Votes	%	±%
DAB	Vincent Cheng Wing-shun	1,485	51.3	+13.8
ADPL	Leung Lai	1,133	39.2	+2.3
People Power	Zorrow Lo Wai-yin	276	9.5	
Majority		352	12.1	
DAB hold		Swing		

=== 2000s ===
Sham Shui Po District Council Election, 2007: Nam Cheong North
Party	Candidate	Votes	%	±%
FTU (DAB)	Vincent Cheng Wing-shun	912	37.5	+9.1
ADPL	Leung Lai	898	36.9	
Democratic Alliance	Leung Hon-wa	624	25.6	−36.0
Majority		14	0.6	
DAB gain from Democratic Alliance		Swing		

Sham Shui Po District Council Election, 2003: Nam Cheong North
Party	Candidate	Votes	%	±%
Independent	Leung Hon-wa	1,355	71.6	+10.1
DAB	Li Wing-cheung	537	28.4	
Majority		818	43.2	
Independent hold		Swing		

=== 1990s ===
Sham Shui Po District Council Election, 1999: Nam Cheong North
Party	Candidate	Votes	%	±%
123DA	Leung Hon-wa	1,031	61.5	
Independent	Yau Ming-tai	645	38.5	
Majority		386	23.0	
123DA gain from Independent		Swing		

Sham Shui Po District Board Election, 1994: Nam Cheong North
Party	Candidate	Votes	%	±%
Independent	Raymond Choy Wai-shek	723	52.6	
ADPL	Leung Kai-yin	592	43.1	
Independent	Leung Chung-ling	59	4.3	
Majority		131	9.5	
Independent hold		Swing		

Sham Shui Po District Board Election, 1991: Nam Cheong North
Party	Candidate	Votes	%	±%
LDF	Raymond Choy Wai-shek	Uncontested		
LDF hold		Swing		

=== 1980s ===
Sham Shui Po District Board Election, 1988: Nam Cheong North
Party	Candidate	Votes	%	±%
Independent	Raymond Choy Wai-shek	782	55.7	−2.0
Independent	Leung Mei-wah	623	44.3	
Majority		159	11.4	
Independent hold		Swing	N/A	

Sham Shui Po District Board Election, 1985: Nam Cheong North
Party	Candidate	Votes	%	±%
Independent	Raymond Choy Wai-shek	847	57.7	
Independent	Chan Tung	621	42.3	
Majority		226	15.4	
Independent hold		Swing		
