= 2007 Sham Shui Po District Council election =

Hong Kong local election

- 18 November 2007

21 (of the 26) seats to Sham Shui Po District Council 14 seats needed for a majority
- Turnout: 38.1%
	First party	Second party
Party	ADPL	DAB
Last election	13 seats, 47.3%	1 seat, 19.4%
Seats before	12	2
Seats won	10	3
Seat change	▼2	▲1
Popular vote	24,315	11,572
Percentage	45.3%	21.5%
Swing	▼2.0%	▼1.4%
	Third party	Fourth party
Party	Democratic	FLU
Last election	2 seats, 11.0%	1 seat
Seats before	2	1
Seats won	2	1
Seat change	Steady	Steady
Popular vote	2,977	1,339
Percentage	5.5%	2.5%
Swing	▼5.5%	N/A
- Colours on map indicate winning party for each constituency.

The 2007 Sham Shui Po District Council election was held on 18 November 2007 to elect all 21 elected members to the 26-member District Council.

== Overall election results ==
Before election:

↓
16	5
Pro-democracy	Pro-Beijing

Change in composition:

↓
13	8
Pro-democracy	Pro-Beijing

Sham Shui Po District Council election result 2007
Party	Seats	Gains	Losses	Net gain/loss	Seats %	Votes %	Votes	+/−
ADPL	10	1	3	–2	47.6	45.3	24,315	−2.0
Independent	5	2	0	+2	23.8	25.7	11,987	
DAB	3	1	0	+1	14.3	21.5	11,572	−1.4
Democratic	2	0	0	0	9.5	5.5	2,977	−5.5
FLU	1	0	0	0	4.8	2.5	1,339	
LSD	0	0	0	0	0	1.5	793	
Democratic Alliance	0	0	1	−1	0	1.2	624	
