= Kalvin Ho =

Hong Kong politician

- 何啟明
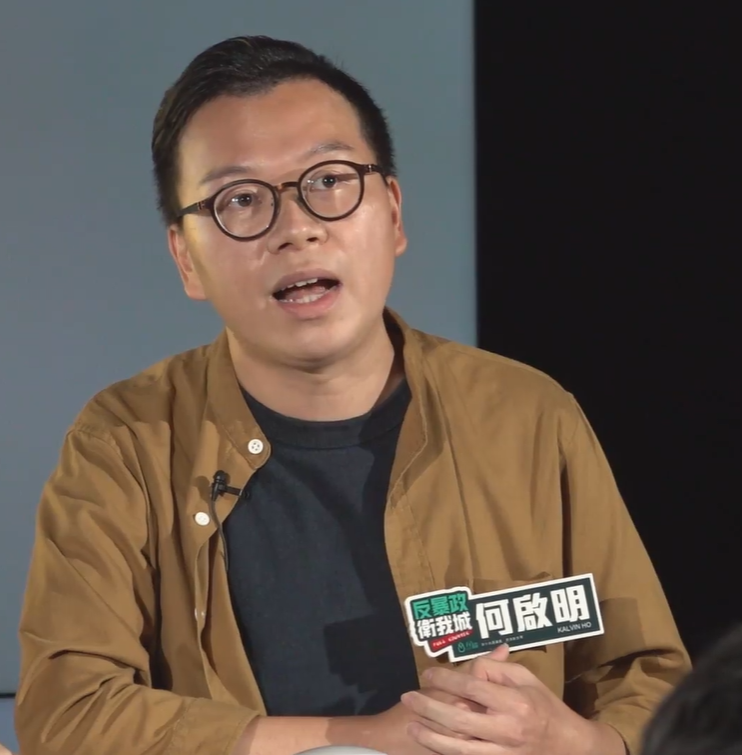
- Ho in 2020

Vice Chairman of the Hong Kong Association for Democracy and People's Livelihood
- In office 27 December 2016 – 17 March 2021
- Preceded by: Pius Yum
- Succeeded by: Howard Lee

Member of the Sham Shui Po District Council
- In office 1 January 2016 – 10 July 2021
- Preceded by: New constituency
- Constituency: Nam Cheong East

Personal details
- Born: 18 September 1988 (age 38) British Hong Kong
- Citizenship: Hong Kong
- Party: Hong Kong Association for Democracy and People's Livelihood; Civic Party (quit in 2015)
- Education: City University of Hong Kong

Kalvin Ho
- Traditional Chinese: 何啟明
- Simplified Chinese: 何启明
Transcriptions
Standard Mandarin
- Hanyu Pinyin: Hé Qǐmíng
Yue: Cantonese
- Jyutping: ho4 kai2 ming4

Kalvin Ho Kai-ming (Chinese: 何啟明; born 18 September 1988) is a Hong Kong politician. He is the current vice chairman of the Hong Kong Association for Democracy and People's Livelihood (ADPL) and member of the Sham Shui Po District Council for Nam Cheong East since 2016.

== Biography ==
Ho graduated from the City University of Hong Kong with a Bachelor of Social Science in Sociology. He used to be a member of the Civic Party. Ho quit the party in 2015 to focus on community services as a member of the Hong Kong Association for Democracy and People's Livelihood (ADPL), which was rooted in Sham Shui Po.

In the 2015 District Council election, Ho ran in Nam Cheong East and was elected with 1,727 votes, becoming a member of the Sham Shui Po District Council. In the 2016 Legislative Council election, Ho replaced Frederick Fung who lost his District Council seat to run in District Council (Second) for ADPL. Due to his lagging behind in the polls, Ho suspended his campaign in the late stage of the election to maximise the election chances of other pro-democrat candidates.

In the March 2018 Kowloon West by-election for the vacancy left by Yau Wai-ching of Youngspiration over the Legislative Council oath taking controversy, Ho ran against veteran Frederick Fung in the intra-party primary election for the candidacy, but later withdrew. Fung later lost in the pro-democracy primary. Ho and other young ADPL members strongly opposed Fung's intention to run in another Kowloon West by-election, which led to Fung's departure from the party.

In the 2020 Legislative Council election, Ho contested in the pro-democracy primaries for the nomination in Kowloon West. Initial results showed Ho came in fifth, which meant he barely lost the nomination to localist camp candidate Frankie Fung. With the paper ballots included, Ho slightly surpassed Fung in the final vote tally, securing a place for ADPL in the general election.

On 6 January 2021, Ho was among 53 members of the pro-democratic camp who were arrested under the national security law, specifically its provision regarding alleged subversion. The group stood accused of the organisation of and participation in unofficial primary elections held by the camp in July 2020. Ho was released on bail on 7 January.

After he was charged with subversion, together with 47 others, Ho decided to resign as vice-chairman of ADPL on 17 March 2021, and he was replaced by Howard Lee. On 10 July, Ho decided to resign from his position as a councillor of Sham Shui Po District Council on 10 July 2021, citing imminent removal from office under a massive disqualification from the government based on violation of both the Basic Law and the national security law.

On 30 May 2024, Ho was found guilty of subversion in the primaries case, along with 13 other defendants.

Political offices
| New constituency | Member of Sham Shui Po District Council; Representative for Nam Cheong East; 2016–2021 | Vacant |
Party political offices
| Preceded by Pius Yum | Vice Chairman of Hong Kong Association for Democracy and People's Livelihood; 2016–2021 | Succeeded by Howard Lee |
