= 2003 Kowloon City District Council election =

Hong Kong local election

- 23 November 2003

22 (of the 27) seats to Kowloon City District Council 14 seats needed for a majority
- Turnout: 42.5%
	First party	Second party	Third party
Party	Democratic	ADPL	Liberal
Last election	4 seats, 20.2%	1 seat, 4.2%	4 seats, 21.8%
Seats before	4	2	4
Seats won	7	3	3
Seat change	▲3	▲1	▼1
Popular vote	14,288	6,564	5,973
Percentage	23.1%	10.6%	9.6%
Swing	▲2.9%	▲6.4%	▼0.9%
	Fourth party	Fifth party	Sixth party
Party	DAB	HKPA	CTU
Last election	3 seats, 18.9%	6 seats, 13.4%	Did not run
Seats before	4	3	0
Seats won	2	1	1
Seat change	▼2	▼2	▲1
Popular vote	9,850	4,685	2,524
Percentage	15.9%	7.6%	4.1%
Swing	▼3.0%	▼5.8%	N/A
- Colours on map indicate winning party for each constituency.

The 2003 Kowloon City District Council election was held on 23 November 2003 to elect all 22 elected members to the 27-member District Council.

== Overall election results ==
Before election:

↓
7	15
Pro-democracy	Pro-Beijing

Change in composition:

↓
12	10
Pro-democracy	Pro-Beijing

Kowloon City District Council election result 2003
Party	Seats	Gains	Losses	Net gain/loss	Seats %	Votes %	Votes	+/−
Independent	5	0	0	0	22.7	27.2	16,795	
Democratic	7	4	1	+3	18.2	23.1	14,288	+2.9
DAB	2	1	3	−2	9.1	15.9	9,850	−3.0
ADPL	3	2	0	+2	13.6	13.6	6,564	+6.4
Liberal	3	0	1	−1	13.6	9.6	5,973	−0.9
HKPA	1	0	2	−2	4.5	7.6	4,685	−5.8
CTU	1	1	0	+1	4.5	4.1	2,524	
Youth Forum	0	0	0	0	0	2.1	1,314	
