= 2011 Kowloon City District Council election =

Hong Kong local election

- 6 November 2011

22 (of the 25) seats to Kowloon City District Council 13 seats needed for a majority
- Turnout: 41.9%
	First party	Second party
Party	DAB	ADPL
Last election	6 seats, 25.3%	3 seats, 14.8%
Seats before	6	3
Seats won	7	4
Seat change	▲1	▲1
Popular vote	18,460	9,528
Percentage	29.2%	15.1%
Swing	▲3.9%	▲0.3%
	Third party	Fourth party
Party	Democratic	Liberal
Last election	2 seats, 8.4%	2 seats, 8.7%
Seats before	2	1
Seats won	1	1
Seat change	▼1	Steady
Popular vote	5,995	Uncontested
Percentage	9.5%	N/A
Swing	▲1.1%	N/A
- Colours on map indicate winning party for each constituency.

The 2011 Kowloon City District Council election was held on 6 November 2011 to elect all 22 elected members to the 25-member District Council.

== Overall election results ==
Before election:

↓
6	16
Pro-dem	Pro-Beijing

Change in composition:

↓
5	17
Pro-dem	Pro-Beijing

Kowloon City District Council election result 2011
Party	Seats	Gains	Losses	Net gain/loss	Seats %	Votes %	Votes	+/−
Independent	9	1	1	0	40.9	33.4	21,116	
DAB	7	1	0	+1	31.8	29.2	18,460	+3.9
ADPL	4	1	0	+1	18.2	15.1	9,528	+0.3
Democratic	1	0	1	−1	4.5	9.5	5,995	+1.1
Civic	0	0	1	−1	0	7.5	4,731	+1.1
People Power	0	0	0	0	0	3.9	2,479	
Economic Synergy	0	0	0	0	0	1.0	636	
CYSRC	0	0	0	0	0	0.1	48	
Liberal	1	0	0	0	4.5	0	0	
