= 2007 Kowloon City District Council election =

Hong Kong local election

- 18 November 2007

22 (of the 27) seats to Kowloon City District Council 14 seats needed for a majority
- Turnout: 40.1%
	First party	Second party	Third party
Party	DAB	ADPL	Democratic
Last election	2 seats, 13.2%	3 seats, 10.6%	7 seats, 23.1%
Seats before	4	4	3
Seats won	6	3	2
Seat change	▲2	▼1	▼1
Popular vote	16,447	9,647	5,467
Percentage	25.3%	14.8%	8.4%
Swing	▲12.1%	▲4.2%	▼14.7%
	Fourth party	Fifth party
Party	Liberal	Civic
Last election	3 seats, 9.6%	New party
Seats before	3	1
Seats won	2	1
Seat change	▼1	Steady
Popular vote	5,642	4,149
Percentage	8.7%	6.4%
Swing	▼0.9%	N/A
- Colours on map indicate winning party for each constituency.

The 2007 Kowloon City District Council election was held on 18 November 2007 to elect all 22 elected members to the 27-member District Council.

== Overall election results ==
Before election:

↓
11	11
Pro-democracy	Pro-Beijing

Change in composition:

↓
6	16
Pro-dem	Pro-Beijing

Kowloon City District Council election result 2007
Party	Seats	Gains	Losses	Net gain/loss	Seats %	Votes %	Votes	+/−
Independent	8	4	3	+1	36.4	36.4	23,703	
DAB	6	3	1	+2	27.3	25.3	16,447	+12.1
ADPL	3	1	2	−1	13.6	14.8	9,647	+4.2
Democratic	2	0	1	−1	4.5	8.4	5,467	−14.7
Liberal	2	0	1	−1	9.1	8.7	5,642	−0.9
Civic	1	0	0	0	4.5	6.4	4,149	
