= 2019 Sham Shui Po District Council election =

Hong Kong local election

- 24 November 2019

All 25 seats to Sham Shui Po District Council 13 seats needed for a majority
- Turnout: 71.5% ▲11.3%
	First party	Second party	Third party
Party	ADPL	Civic	DAB
Last election	9 seats, 30.1%	1 seat, 6.6%	5 seats, 17.8%
Seats before	7	1	5
Seats won	11	4	2
Seat change	▲4	▲3	▼3
Popular vote	41,865	14,033	22,132
Percentage	28.8%	9.7%	15.2%
Swing	▼1.3%	▲3.1%	▼2.6%
	Fourth party	Fifth party	Sixth party
Party	Democratic	CSWWF	CSWCEP
Last election	1 seat, 2.7%	New party	Did not contest
Seats before	2	0	0
Seats won	2	1	1
Seat change	Steady	▲1	▲1
Popular vote	5,965	4,281	3,359
Percentage	4.1%	2.9%	2.3%
Swing	▲1.4%	N/A	N/A
	Seventh party	Eighth party	Ninth party
Party	BPA/KWND	Liberal	FLU
Last election	4 seats, 20.2%	1 seat, 2.6%	1 seat, 1.8%
Seats before	3	1	1
Seats won	0	0	0
Seat change	▼3	▼1	▼1
Popular vote	20,561	2,391	1,734
Percentage	14.1%	1.6%	1.2%
Swing	▼6.1%	▼1.0%	▼0.6%
- Colours on map indicate winning party for each constituency.

The 2019 Sham Shui Po District Council election was held on 24 November 2019 to elect all 25 members to the Sham Shui Po District Council.

Amid the massive pro-democracy protests, the pro-democrats scored a historic landslide victory by taking 22 of the 25 seats. The ADPL retained the status of the largest party, securing 11 seats in total.

== Overall election results ==
Before election:

↓
11	1	11
Pro-democracy		Pro-Beijing

Change in composition:

↓
22	1	2
Pro-democracy		PB

Sham Shui Po District Council election result 2019
Party	Seats	Gains	Losses	Net gain/loss	Seats %	Votes %	Votes	+/−
ADPL	11	4	0	+4	44.0	28.8	41,865	−1.3
Independent	4	2	1	+1	16.0	18.3	26,608	
DAB	2	1	4	−3	8.0	15.2	22,132	−2.6
BPA	0	0	3	−3	0.0	12.0	17,509	−8.2
Civic	4	3	0	+3	16.0	9.7	14,033	+3.1
Democratic	2	1	1	0	4.3	2.7	5,965	+1.3
CSWWF	1	1	0	+1	4.0	2.9	4,281	
CSWCEP	1	1	0	+1	4.0	2.3	3,359	
KWND	4	0	0	0	0.0	2.1	3,052	
NPP	0	0	0	0	0.0	1.7	2,430	
Liberal	0	0	1	−1	0.0	1.6	2,391	−1.0
FLU	0	0	1	−1	0.0	1.2	1,734	–0.6
