= Nam Shan, Tai Hang Tung & Tai Hang Sai (constituency) =

Hong Kong constituency

- Elected constituency for the Sham Shui Po District Council
- Boundary of Nam Shan, Tai Hang Tung & Tai Hang Sai in Sham Shui Po District
- District: Sham Shui Po
- Legislative Council constituency: Kowloon West
- Population: 19,773 (2019)
- Electorate: 12,087 (2019)

Current constituency
- Created: 2007
- Number of members: One
- Member: Vacant
- Created from: Lung Ping; Tai Hang Hung & Yau Yat Tsuen; Nam Shan

Nam Shan, Tai Hang Tung & Tai Hang Sai (Chinese: 南山、大坑東及大坑西) is one of the 25 constituencies in the Sham Shui Po District of Hong Kong which was created in 2007.

The constituency loosely covers Nam Shan Estate, Tai Hang Tung Estate and Tai Hang Sai Estate with the estimated population of 19,773.

== Councillors represented ==
Election	Member	Party
2007	Wong Kwai-wan	ADPL
2011	Wai Hoi-ying	Independent (KWND)
2015	Tam Kwok-kiu→Vacant	ADPL

== Election results ==
=== 2010s ===
Sham Shui Po District Council Election, 2019: Nam Shan, Tai Hang Tung & Tai Hang Sai
Party	Candidate	Votes	%	±%
ADPL	Tam Kwok-kiu	4,546	57.25	+1.65
Nonpartisan	Chen Lihong	3,231	40.69	
Nonpartisan	Chui Chun-nam	116	1.46	
Independent	Chan Ping-fai	47	0.59	
Majority		2,315	16.56	
Turnout		7,966	65.97	
ADPL hold		Swing		

Sham Shui Po District Council Election, 2015: Nam Shan, Tai Hang Tung & Tai Hang Sai
Party	Candidate	Votes	%	±%
ADPL	Tam Kwok-kiu	2,563	55.6	+10.5
KWND	Wai Hoi-ying	1,991	43.2	–6.1
Nonpartisan	Foo Wai-lok	54	1.2	
Majority		572	12.4	+8.2
Turnout		4,651	52.6	
ADPL gain from KWND		Swing	+8.3	

Sham Shui Po District Council Election, 2011: Nam Shan, Tai Hang Tung & Tai Hang Sai
Party	Candidate	Votes	%	±%
Independent (KWND)	Wai Hoi-ying	2,291	49.3	+12.3
ADPL	Tam Kwok-kiu	2,098	45.1	–17.9
Nonpartisan	Louis Lui Man-fung	259	5.6	
Majority		193	4.2	–21.8
Independent gain from ADPL		Swing	+15.1	

=== 2000s ===
Sham Shui Po District Council Election, 2007: Nam Shan, Tai Hang Tung & Tai Hang Sai
Party	Candidate	Votes	%	±%
ADPL	Wong Kwai-wan	2,243	63.0	
Nonpartisan	Wai Hoi-ying	1,317	37.0	
Majority		926	26.0	
ADPL win (new seat)				
