= 1999 Kowloon City District Council election =

Hong Kong local election

- 28 November 1999

22 (of the 27) seats to Kowloon City District Council 14 seats needed for a majority
- Turnout: 30.1%
	First party	Second party	Third party
Party	HKPA	Liberal	Democratic
Last election	6 seats, 29.4%	2 seats, 9.9%	2 seats, 15.0%
Seats before	7	5	2
Seats won	6	4	4
Seat change	▼1	▼1	▲2
Popular vote	5,327	8,702	8,038
Percentage	13.4%	21.8%	20.2%
Swing	▼16.0%	▲11.9%	▲5.2%
	Fourth party	Fifth party
Party	DAB	ADPL
Last election	2 seats, 10.2%	Did not contest
Seats before	2	0
Seats won	3	1
Seat change	▲1	▲1
Popular vote	7,510	1,687
Percentage	18.9%	4.2%
Swing	▲8.7%	N/A
- Colours on map indicate winning party for each constituency.

The 1999 Kowloon City District Council election was held on 28 November 1999 to elect all 22 elected members to the 27-member District Council.

== Overall election results ==
Before election:

↓
4	17
Pro-dem	Pro-Beijing

Change in composition:

↓
6	16
Pro-democracy	Pro-Beijing

Kowloon City District Council election result 1999
Party	Seats	Gains	Losses	Net gain/loss	Seats %	Votes %	Votes	+/−
Liberal	4	1	2	−1	13.6	21.8	8,702	+11.9
Independent	4	1	1	0	18.2	20.3	8,091	
Democratic	4	2	0	+2	18.2	20.2	8,038	+5.2
DAB	3	1	0	+1	9.1	18.9	7,510	+8.7
123DA	0	0	1	−1	0	13.4	5,327	
HKPA	6	0	0	−1	4.5	7.6	4,685	−5.8
ADPL	3	1	0	+1	13.6	4.2	1,687	
