= 2003 Sham Shui Po District Council election =

Local election in Hong Kong

- 23 November 2003

21 (of the 26) seats to Sham Shui Po District Council 14 seats needed for a majority
- Turnout: 43.6%
	First party	Second party
Party	ADPL	Democratic
Last election	10 seats, 38.4%	3 seats, 24.2%
Seats before	10	3
Seats won	13	2
Seat change	▲3	▼1
Popular vote	24,525	5,694
Percentage	47.3%	11.0%
Swing	▲10.9%	▼13.2%
	Third party	Fourth party
Party	DAB	FLU
Last election	3 seats, 21.2%	Did not run
Seats before	3	1
Seats won	1	1
Seat change	▼2	Steady
Popular vote	11,849	N/A
Percentage	22.9%	N/A
Swing	▲1.7%	N/A
- Colours on map indicate winning party for each constituency.

The 2003 Sham Shui Po District Council election was held on 23 November 2003 to elect all 21 elected members to the 26-member District Council.

== Overall election results ==
Before election:

↓
16	5
Pro-democracy	Pro-Beijing

Change in composition:

↓
17	4
Pro-democracy	Pro-Beijing

Sham Shui Po District Council election result 2003
Party	Seats	Gains	Losses	Net gain/loss	Seats %	Votes %	Votes	+/−
ADPL	10	3	0	+3	47.6	47.3	24,525	+10.9
DAB	1	0	2	−2	4.8	22.9	11,849	+1.7
Independent	4	0	0	0	19.0	15.4	7,991	
Democratic	2	1	2	−1	9.5	11.0	5,694	−13.2
Frontier	0	0	0	0	0	2.0	1,025	
Liberal	0	0	0	0	0	1.3	677	
FLU	1	0	0	0	4.8	0	0	
