= Nam Cheong South (constituency) =

- Elected constituency for the Sham Shui Po District Council
- Boundary of Nam Cheong South in Sham Shui Po District
- District: Sham Shui Po
- Legislative Council constituency: Kowloon West
- Population: 19,858 (2019)
- Electorate: 6,159 (2019)

Current constituency
- Created: 1994
- Number of members: One
- Member: Li Ting-fung (ADPL)

Nam Cheong South (Chinese: 南昌南) is one of the 25 constituencies in the Sham Shui Po District of Hong Kong which was created in 1994.

The constituency loosely covers southern Nam Cheong in Sham Shui Po with the estimated population of 19,858.

== Councillors represented ==
Election	Member	Party
1994	Wong Kam-keun	Nonpartisan
200?	Wong Kam-keun	FLU
2011	Lee Wing-man	FLU
2019	Li Ting-fung	ADPL

== Election results ==
=== 2010s ===
Sham Shui Po District Council Election, 2019: Nam Cheong South
Party	Candidate	Votes	%	±%
ADPL	Li Ting-fung	2,334	57.37	
FLU	Lee Wing-man	1,734	42.63	−24.00
Majority		600	13.74	
Turnout		4,089	66.41	
ADPL gain from FLU		Swing		

Sham Shui Po District Council Election, 2015: Nam Cheong South
Party	Candidate	Votes	%	±%
FLU	Lee Wing-man	1,544	66.63	−5.51
CYSRC	Lam Wai-tong	786	33.73	+5.51
Majority		758	32.80	
Turnout		2,330	36.38	
FLU hold		Swing		

Sham Shui Po District Council Election, 2011: Nam Cheong South
Party	Candidate	Votes	%	±%
FLU	Lee Wing-man	1,375	72.14	−10.31
CYSRC	Gordon Fong Ka-keung	531	27.86	
Majority		844	4.28	
Turnout		1,906	27.46	
FLU hold		Swing		

=== 2000s ===
Sham Shui Po District Council Election, 2007: Nam Cheong South
Party	Candidate	Votes	%	±%
FLU	Wong Kam-kuen	1,339	82.45	+12.26
CLP	Lau Yuk-shing	285	17.55	
Majority		1,054	64.90	
FLU hold		Swing		

Sham Shui Po District Council Election, 2003: Nam Cheong South
Party	Candidate	Votes	%	±%
FLU	Wong Kam-kuen	Uncontested		
FLU hold		Swing		

=== 1990s ===
Sham Shui Po District Council Election, 1999: Nam Cheong South
Party	Candidate	Votes	%	±%
Independent	Wong Kam-kuen	996	66.62	+11.74
Democratic	Yim Chun-ming	499	33.38	
Majority		497	33.24	
Independent hold		Swing		

Sham Shui Po District Board Election, 1994: Nam Cheong South
Party	Candidate	Votes	%	±%
Independent	Wong Kam-kuen	692	54.88	
Independent	Ng Kei	569	45.12	
Majority		123	9.76	
Independent win (new seat)				
