= 2011 Sham Shui Po District Council election =

Hong Kong local election

- 6 November 2011

21 (of the 24) seats to Sham Shui Po District Council 13 seats needed for a majority
- Turnout: 43.2%
	First party	Second party
Party	ADPL	DAB
Last election	10 seats, 45.3%	3 seats, 21.5%
Seats before	10	3
Seats won	7	4
Seat change	▼3	▲1
Popular vote	24,503	13,316
Percentage	35.6%	19.3%
Swing	▼9.7%	▼2.2%
	Third party	Fourth party
Party	FCERA	FLU
Last election	New party	1 seat, 1.5%
Seats before	0	1
Seats won	1	1
Seat change	▲1	Steady
Popular vote	2,235	1,375
Percentage	3.3%	2.0%
Swing	N/A	▲0.5%
- Colours on map indicate winning party for each constituency.

The 2011 Sham Shui Po District Council election was held on 6 November 2011 to elect all 21 elected members to the 24-member District Council.

== Overall election results ==
Before election:

↓
13	8
Pro-democracy	Pro-Beijing

Change in composition:

↓
7	14
Pro-democracy	Pro-Beijing

Sham Shui Po District Council election result 2011
Party	Seats	Gains	Losses	Net gain/loss	Seats %	Votes %	Votes	+/−
ADPL	7	0	3	–3	33.3	35.6	24,503	−9.7
Independent	8	2	0	+2	38.1	25.7	17,705	
DAB	4	1	0	+1	19.0	19.3	13,316	−2.2
Civic	0	0	1	−1	0	5.5	3,757	
People Power	0	0	0	0	0	4.8	3,336	
FCERA	1	1	0	+1	0	3.3	2,235	
FLU	1	0	0	0	4.8	2.0	1,375	+0.5
Democratic	0	0	1	−1	0	1.4	985	−4.1
Liberal	0	0	0	0	0	1.0	687	
CYSRC	0	0	0	0	0	0.8	531	
LSD	0	0	0	0	0	0.7	493	−0.8
