= 1999 Sham Shui Po District Council election =

Hong Kong local election

- 28 November 1999

21 (of the 26) seats to Sham Shui Po District Council 14 seats needed for a majority
- Turnout: 34.1%
	First party	Second party
Party	ADPL	Democratic
Last election	11 seats, 48.7%	3 seats, 11.0%
Seats before	9	5
Seats won	10	3
Seat change	▲1	▼2
Popular vote	18,088	11,405
Percentage	38.4%	24.2%
Swing	▼10.3%	▲13.2%
	Third party	Fourth party
Party	DAB	123DA
Last election	0 seats, 3.5%	Did not contest
Seats before	1	0
Seats won	3	1
Seat change	▲2	▲1
Popular vote	9,970	1,031
Percentage	21.2%	2.2%
Swing	▲17.7%	▼2.0%
- Colours on map indicate winning party for each constituency.

The 1999 Sham Shui Po District Council election was held on 28 November 1999 to elect all 21 elected members to the 26-member District Council.

== Overall election results ==
Before election:

↓
14	6
Pro-democracy	Pro-Beijing

Change in composition:

↓
15	6
Pro-democracy	Pro-Beijing

Sham Shui Po District Council election result 1999
Party	Seats	Gains	Losses	Net gain/loss	Seats %	Votes %	Votes	+/−
ADPL	10	1	0	+1	47.6	38.4	18,088	−10.3
Democratic	3	0	2	−2	9.5	24.2	11,405	+13.2
DAB	3	2	0	+2	4.8	21.2	9,970	+17.7
Independent	4	1	2	−1	19.0	14.0	6,610	
123DA	1	1	0	+1	4.8	2.2	1,031	−2.0
