= Choi Wan East (constituency) =

Constituency in the Wong Tai Sin District, Hong Kong

- Elected constituency for the Wong Tai Sin District Council
- Boundary of Choi Wan East in Wong Tai Sin District
- District: Wong Tai Sin
- Legislative Council constituency: Kowloon East
- Population: 14,212 (2019)
- Electorate: 7,628 (2019)

Current constituency
- Created: 1999
- Number of members: One
- Member: Bruce Liu Sing-lee (ADPL)

Choi Wan East
- Traditional Chinese: 彩雲東
Transcriptions
Yue: Cantonese
- Yale Romanization: Chói wàhn dūng
- Jyutping: Coi2 wan4 dung1

Choi Wan East is one of the 25 constituencies in the Wong Tai Sin District in Hong Kong. The constituency returns one district councillor to the Wong Tai Sin District Council, with an election every four years.

The constituency is loosely based on Aria, Choi Fat Estate, part of Choi Wan (II) Estate, Fung Shing Street Disciplined Services Quarters and Scenic View with an estimated population of 13,945.

== Councillors represented ==
Election	Member	Party
1999	Lo Siu-wah	FTU
2003	Wong Kwok-tung	Independent
2006	Wong Kwok-tung	LSD
20??	Wong Kwok-tung	Democratic
2015	Timothy Choy Tsz-kin	DAB
2019	Bruce Liu Sing-lee	ADPL

== Election results ==
=== 2010s ===
Wong Tai Sin District Council Election, 2019: Choi Wan East
Party	Candidate	Votes	%	±%
ADPL	Liu Sing-lee	2,976	51.77	
DAB	Timothy Choy Tsz-kin	2,773	48.23	
Majority		203	3.54	
Turnout		5,776	75.77	
ADPL gain from DAB		Swing		
