= 2015 Kowloon City District Council election =

Hong Kong local election

- 22 November 2015

All 24 seats to Kowloon City District Council 13 seats needed for a majority
- Turnout: 48.7%
	First party	Second party	Third party
Party	DAB	ADPL	KWND/BPA
Last election	7 seats, 29.2%	4 seats, 15.1%	Did not stand
Seats before	7	4	1
Seats won	8	3	1
Seat change	▲1	▼1	Steady
Popular vote	18,768	13,118	2,345
Percentage	24.4%	17.1%	3.1%
Swing	▼4.8%	▲2.0%	N/A
	Fourth party	Fifth party
Party	Youngspiration	Liberal
Last election	New party	1 seats
Seats before	0	1
Seats won	1	1
Seat change	▲1	Steady
Popular vote	4,155	Uncontested
Percentage	5.4%	N/A
Swing	N/A	N/A
- Colours on map indicate winning party for each constituency.

The 2015 Kowloon City District Council election was held on 22 November 2015 to elect all 24 members of the Kowloon City District Council.

== Overall election results ==
Before election:

↓
5	17
Pro-dem	Pro-Beijing

Change in composition:

↓
4	20
Pro-dem	Pro-Beijing

Kowloon City District Council election result 2015
Party	Seats	Gains	Losses	Net gain/loss	Seats %	Votes %	Votes	+/−
Independent	10	4	3	+1	41.7	33.6	25,798	
DAB	8	3	2	+1	33.3	24.4	18,768	–4.8
ADPL	3	1	2	–1	12.5	17.1	13,118	+2.0
Democratic	0	0	0	0	0	6.7	5,182	–2.8
Youngspiration	1	1	0	+1	4.2	5.4	4,155	
FTU	0	0	1	–1	0	3.0	2,312	
Civic	0	0	0	0	0	2.4	1,842	–5.1
KWND	1	0	0	0	4.2	3.1	2,345	
Labour	0	0	0	0	0	5.4	1,740	
HKAA	0	0	0	0	0	2.1	1,599	
Liberal	1	0	0	0	4.5	0	0	
