= Tam Kwok-kiu =

Hong Kong justice of the peace

Tam Kwok-kiu MH, JP
- 譚國僑
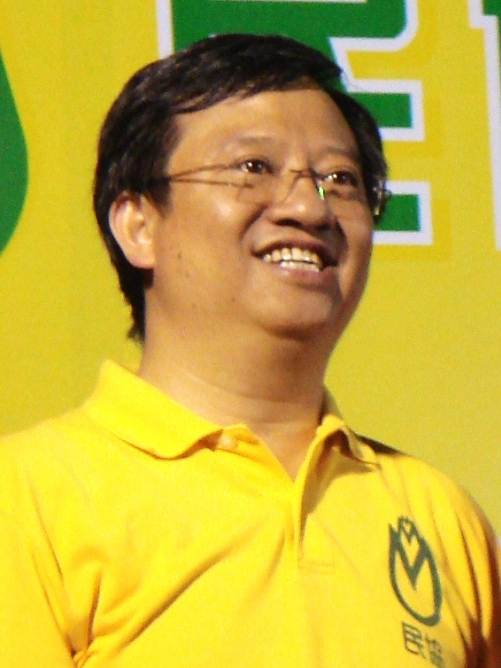

Chairman of the Sham Shui Po District Council
- In office 1 July 1997 – 31 December 2007
- Preceded by: Eric Wong
- Succeeded by: Chan Tung

Personal details
- Born: 13 September 1957 (age 69) Hong Kong
- Party: Association for Democracy and People's Livelihood (ADPL)
- Education: Hong Kong Baptist College; University of Hong Kong; Chinese University of Hong Kong
- Occupation: District Councillor
- Profession: Social worker

Tam Kwok-kiu, MH, JP (Chinese: 譚國僑; born 13 September 1957) is a Hong Kong Association for Democracy and People's Livelihood (ADPL) politician in Hong Kong. He is the current member of the Sham Shui Po District Council, serving from 1985 to 2011 and again since 2016. He had also been chairman and vice-chairman of the council.

== Biography ==
Tam was born in Hong Kong in 1957. He was educated at the La Salle College and graduated from the Hong Kong Baptist College in 1978 with a degree in Social Work. He joined Frederick Fung to work as a social worker in Sham Shui Po. In 1983, he helped Fung to get elected to the Urban Council. In the 1985 District Board elections, he was elected to the Sham Shui Po District Board. In 1986, he co-founded the Hong Kong Association for Democracy and People's Livelihood (ADPL) with Fung and other pro-democracy grassroots activists.

In the 1995 Urban Council election, Tam won a seat in Sham Shui Po East uncontestedly. He held the seat through 1997 until the provisional council was abolished in 2000. In 1997, he was elected chairman of the Provisional Sham Shui Po District Council. His chairmanship ended in 2007 when the ADPL lost majority in the council. He was elected vice-chairman of the council instead.

In 2005, Tam represented pan-democrats to run in the Hong Kong and Kowloon District Councils Subsector by-election for the Election Committee but was not elected.

In 2011 District Council elections, he was unexpectedly defeated by pro-Beijing independent Wai Hoi-ying in Nam Shan, Tai Hang Tung & Tai Hang Sai constituency when he tried to retain ADPL's seat from retiring party colleague Wong Kwai-wan.

In the next year's Legislative Council election, Tam represented ADPL to run in Kowloon West, succeeding Frederick Fung who run in the newly established District Council (Second) "super seat". Tam received 30,364 votes and could not win a seat for the ADPL.

In 2015 District Council elections, Tam won back a seat in Nam Shan, Tai Hang Tung & Tai Hang Sai, defeating Wai Hoi-ying with a margin of 572 votes. He successfully defended his seat in the 2019 elections, winning 4,546 votes.

In 2016, Tam narrowly defeated chairwoman Rosanda Mok in a primary to stand again in Kowloon West for the 2016 Legislative Council election.

He also holds a master's degree in social science from the Chinese University of Hong Kong and a master's degree in social work from the University of Hong Kong.

Political offices
New seat	Member of Sham Shui Po District Board; Representative for Pak Tin; 1985–1994	Succeeded by Yan Kai-wing
New seat	Member of Sham Shui Po District Council; Representative for Chak On; 1994–2003	Succeeded by Ng Mei
Preceded by Frederick Fung	Member of Urban Council; Representative for Sham Shui Po East; 1995–1999	Council abolished
Preceded by Eric Wong	Chairman of Sham Shui Po District Council; 1997–2007	Succeeded by Chan Tung
Preceded by Frederick Fung	Member of Sham Shui Po District Council; Representative for Shek Kip Mei; 2004–2007	Constituency abolished
Preceded by Leung Lai	Member of Sham Shui Po District Council; Representative for Shek Kip Mei & Nam Cheong East; 2008–2011	Succeeded by Chun Po-shan
Preceded by Wai Hoi-ying	Member of Sham Shui Po District Council; Representative for Nam Shan, Tai Hang Tung & Tai Hang Sai; 2016–present	Incumbent
Party political offices
Preceded by Yim Tin-sang	Vice-chairman of Hong Kong Association for Democracy and People's Livelihood; 2008–present	Incumbent
