= Wei Haiying =

Chinese footballer

Wai Hoi-ying

Sham Shui Po District Councillor
- In office 2011–2015

Personal details
- Born: January 5, 1971 (age 55)
Association football career
International career
Years	Team	Apps	(Gls)
1990-1996	China		
Medal record
Women's football
Representing China
Olympic Games
Silver medal – second place	1996 Atlanta	Team
Asian Games
Gold medal – first place	1990 Beijing	Team
Gold medal – first place	1994 Hiroshima	Team

Wai Hoi-ying (also known as Wei Haiying, simplified Chinese: 韦海英; traditional Chinese: 韋海英, born January 5, 1971) is a female Chinese and Hong Kong association football player who competed in the 1996 Summer Olympics for China women's national football team. Between 2011 and 2015 she was the Sham Shui Po District Councillor for the Nam Shan, Tai Hang Tung & Tai Hang Sai constituency in Hong Kong.

In 1996 she won the silver medal with the Chinese team. She played four matches including the final and scored two goals.

== International goals ==
No.	Date	Venue	Opponent	Score	Result	Competition
1.	19 November 1991	Guangzhou, China	Denmark	2–2	2–2	1991 FIFA Women's World Cup
2.	6 June 1995	Gävle, Sweden	United States	2–3	3–3	1995 FIFA Women's World Cup
3.	10 June 1995	Västerås, Sweden	Denmark	3–1	3–1	1995 FIFA Women's World Cup
4.	24 September 1995	Kota Kinabalu, Malaysia	Philippines	?–0	21–0	1995 AFC Women's Championship
5.	24 September 1995	Kota Kinabalu, Malaysia	Philippines	?–0	21–0	1995 AFC Women's Championship
6.	24 September 1995	Kota Kinabalu, Malaysia	Philippines	?–0	21–0	1995 AFC Women's Championship
7.	24 September 1995	Kota Kinabalu, Malaysia	Philippines	?–0	21–0	1995 AFC Women's Championship
8.	24 September 1995	Kota Kinabalu, Malaysia	Philippines	?–0	21–0	1995 AFC Women's Championship
9.	26 September 1995	Kota Kinabalu, Malaysia	Hong Kong	3–0	12–0	1995 AFC Women's Championship
10.	26 September 1995	Kota Kinabalu, Malaysia	Hong Kong	9–0	12–0	1995 AFC Women's Championship
11.	26 September 1995	Kota Kinabalu, Malaysia	Hong Kong	10–0	12–0	1995 AFC Women's Championship
12.	28 September 1995	Kota Kinabalu, Malaysia	Kazakhstan	1–0	7–0	1995 AFC Women's Championship
