= 2019 Kowloon City District Council election =

Hong Kong local election

- 24 November 2019

All 25 seats to Kowloon City District Council 13 seats needed for a majority
- Turnout: 71.6% ▲22.9%
	First party	Second party
Party	Democratic	DAB
Last election	0 seat, 6.7%	8 seats, 24.4%
Seats before	2	8
Seats won	10	4
Seat change	▲7	▼4
Popular vote	38,796	23,329
Percentage	27.0%	16.2%
Swing	▲20.3%	▼8.2%
	Third party	Fourth party
Party	BPA	Liberal
Last election	1 seat, 3.1%	1 seat
Seats before	5	1
Seats won	3	1
Seat change	▼2	Steady
Popular vote	11,760	2,952
Percentage	8.2%	2.1%
Swing	▲5.1%	N/A
- Colours on map indicate winning party for each constituency.

The 2019 Kowloon City District Council election was held on 24 November 2019 to elect all 25 members of the Kowloon City District Council. It was part of the 2019 Hong Kong local elections.

The pro-democrats scored a historic landslide victory in the election amid the massive pro-democracy protests, taking control of the council by securing 15 of the 25 seats. The Democratic Party emerged as the largest party, overtaking DAB with 10 seats.

== Overall election results ==
Before election:

↓
4	20
Pro-dem	Pro-Beijing

Change in composition:

↓
15	10
Pro-democracy	Pro-Beijing

Kowloon City District Council election result 2019
Party	Seats	Gains	Losses	Net gain/loss	Seats %	Votes %	Votes	+/−
Independent	7	4	5	−1	28.0	41.9	60,292	
Democratic	10	8	0	+8	40.0	27.0	38,796	+20.3
DAB	4	0	4	−4	16.0	16.2	23,329	–8.2
BPA	3	0	2	−2	12.0	8.2	11,760	+5.1
Civic	0	0	0	0	0.0	2.7	3,934	+0.3
Liberal	1	0	0	0	4.0	2.1	2,952	
LSD	0	0	0	0	0.0	1.1	1,538	
FTU	0	0	0	0	0.0	0.9	1,315	−2.1
