= Prince (constituency) =

Hong Kong constituency

- Elected constituency for the Kowloon City District Council
- Boundary of Prince in Kowloon City District
- District: Kowloon City
- Legislative Council constituency: Kowloon Central
- Population: 14,931 (2019)
- Electorate: 6,894 (2019)

Current constituency
- Created: 1994
- Number of members: One
- Member: Wong Kwok-tung (Democratic)
- Created from: Kowloon Tong; Ma Tau Wai; Lung Shing

Prince is one of the 25 constituencies in the Kowloon City District in Hong Kong. The constituency returns one district councillor to the Kowloon City District Council, with an election every four years.

Prince constituency is loosely based on eastern part of the area around Prince Edward Road West and Boundary Street with an estimated population of 14,931.

== Councillors represented ==
Election	Member	Party
1994	Yum Sin-ling	123 Democratic Alliance
1999	Wong Yee-him	Liberal
2008	Wong Yee-him	Independent
2013	Wong Yee-him	DAB
2015	Ting Kin-wa	Independent
2019	Wong Kwok-tung	Democratic

== Election results ==
=== 2010s ===
Kowloon City District Council Election, 2019: Prince
Party	Candidate	Votes	%	±%
Democratic	Wong Kwok-tung	2,512	51.32	
Nonpartisan	Ting Kin-wa	2,219	45.33	
Nonpartisan	Tam Kit-man	164	3.35	
Majority		293	5.99	
Turnout		4,902	71.11	
Democratic gain from Nonpartisan		Swing		

Kowloon City District Council Election, 2015: Prince
Party	Candidate	Votes	%	±%
Independent	Ting Kin-wa	Uncontested		
Independent gain from DAB		Swing		

Kowloon City District Council Election, 2011: Prince
Party	Candidate	Votes	%	±%
Independent	Wong Yee-him	1,554	72.0	−16.2
Civic	Tang Chi-ying	604	28.0	
Independent hold		Swing		

=== 2000s ===
Kowloon City District Council Election, 2007: Prince
Party	Candidate	Votes	%	±%
Liberal	Wong Yee-him	1,449	88.2	+15.8
Independent	Kwong Sui-wah	193	11.8	
Liberal hold		Swing		

Kowloon City District Council Election, 2003: Prince
Party	Candidate	Votes	%	±%
Liberal	Wong Yee-him	1,429	72.4	+6.4
Independent	Stephen Yam Chi-ming	544	27.6	
Liberal hold		Swing		

=== 1990s ===
Kowloon City District Council Election, 1999: Prince
Party	Candidate	Votes	%	±%
Liberal	Wong Yee-him	984	66.0	
123DA	Lin Yueh-hsiu	491	32.9	−25.6
Liberal gain from 123DA		Swing		

Kowloon City District Board Election, 1994: Prince
Party	Candidate	Votes	%	±%
123DA	Yum Sin-ling	742	58.5	
LDF	Yung Ching-tat	514	40.5	
123DA win (new seat)				
