= Ding Lik-kiu =

Hong Kong missionary

Dr. Ding Lik-kiu (Chinese: 陳立僑, 1921 in Raj of Sarawak – 24 June 2008 in San Francisco, United States) was a prominent Hong Kong social activist in the 1970s and 80s.

== Biography ==
Ding was born in an impoverished family in Borneo (modern day Sarawak) in 1921. His father was a poor merchant and murdered on the road when Ding was a baby. When he was 5 his mother found a rich local merchant to adopt him, but could not bear to part with him on the doorstep of the merchant's house and took him back home. A year later she died from the vitamin deficiency heart disease Beriberi. Ding was taken in by the local Methodist missionary school and through a series of scholarships eventually studied medicine at Johns Hopkins University in Baltimore and then went back to Borneo to serve as a medical missionary, where he helped set up Christ Hospital.

After moving to Hong Kong in 1962, he started fighting for the rights of workers and the underprivileged. His focus on social ills started with drug addiction, one of the city's gravest social problems at the time. He was an experienced narcotics researcher and called for better rehabilitation of addicts. A methadone outpatient scheme, which Ding had advocated since the late 1960s backed up by results from Randomized control trial, was set up in 1972 by the Medical Health Department. He even opposed to the performance of the Rolling Stones in Hong Kong because of their past association with drugs.

Among other issues he also campaigned against corruption, drug addiction and price rises by public utilities, and advocated women's right to abortion, workers' rights, democratic reform, environmental protection, population growth and human rights protection.

He led a seven-member delegation to London in May 1984 to lobby for democratic reform in Hong Kong before the colony's handover to China and met with the former British Prime Minister Edward Heath.

He was the chairman of the Hong Kong Christian Industrial Committee for more than 20 years. He was also founding chairman of the Association for Democracy and Justice in 1985 and became founding chairman of the Association for Democracy and People's Livelihood in 1986. He founded first green group in Hong Kong Conservancy Association and Hong Kong Youth Music Society.

His motto was to 'Live simply, give generously, and think vigorously'.

== Personal life ==
Ding had 4 children with his wife Lillian who was also a doctor and very engaged in social work. Their oldest daughter Vivian is a doctor, their second daughter Mary May is in the technology industry, their third daughter Grace is also doctor, their youngest son Luke studied medicine but switched to finance and now also very engaged in philanthropy.

Ding emigrated to San Francisco in 1990 and died of pneumonia on 24 June 2008 at the age of 87.

Party political offices
New political party	Chairman of the Association for Democracy and People's Livelihood; 1986–1989	Succeeded by Frederick Fung
