= New Hong Kong Society =

The New Hong Kong Society (Chinese: 新香港學社) was a political organisation that existed in the early 1980s in the background of Sino-British negotiation over Hong Kong's sovereignty after 1997. It was one of the first groups to accept Chinese sovereignty over Hong Kong and the idea of Hong Kong people ruling Hong Kong through democratic means. The society comprised mainly young graduates who recently graduated in the 1980s and offered a detailed plan to implement the idea of Hong Kong people ruling Hong Kong in early 1983 and had discussion with the officials of the Hong Kong and Macao Affairs Office.
