= Kowloon City District Council =

Hong Kong district council

Coordinates: 22.31198°N 114.18978°E

Kowloon City District Council 九龍城區議會

Type
- Type: Hong Kong District Council of the Kowloon City District

History
- Founded: 16 December 1981 (District Board); 1 July 1997 (Provisional); 1 January 2000 (District Council)

Leadership
- Chair: Alice Choi Man-kwan, Independent

Structure
- Seats: 20 councillors consisting of 4 elected members 8 district committee members 8 appointed members
- DAB: 6 / 20
- BPA: 4 / 20
- FTU: 1 / 20
- Independent: 9 / 20

Elections
- Voting system: First past the post
- Last election: 24 November 2019

Meeting place
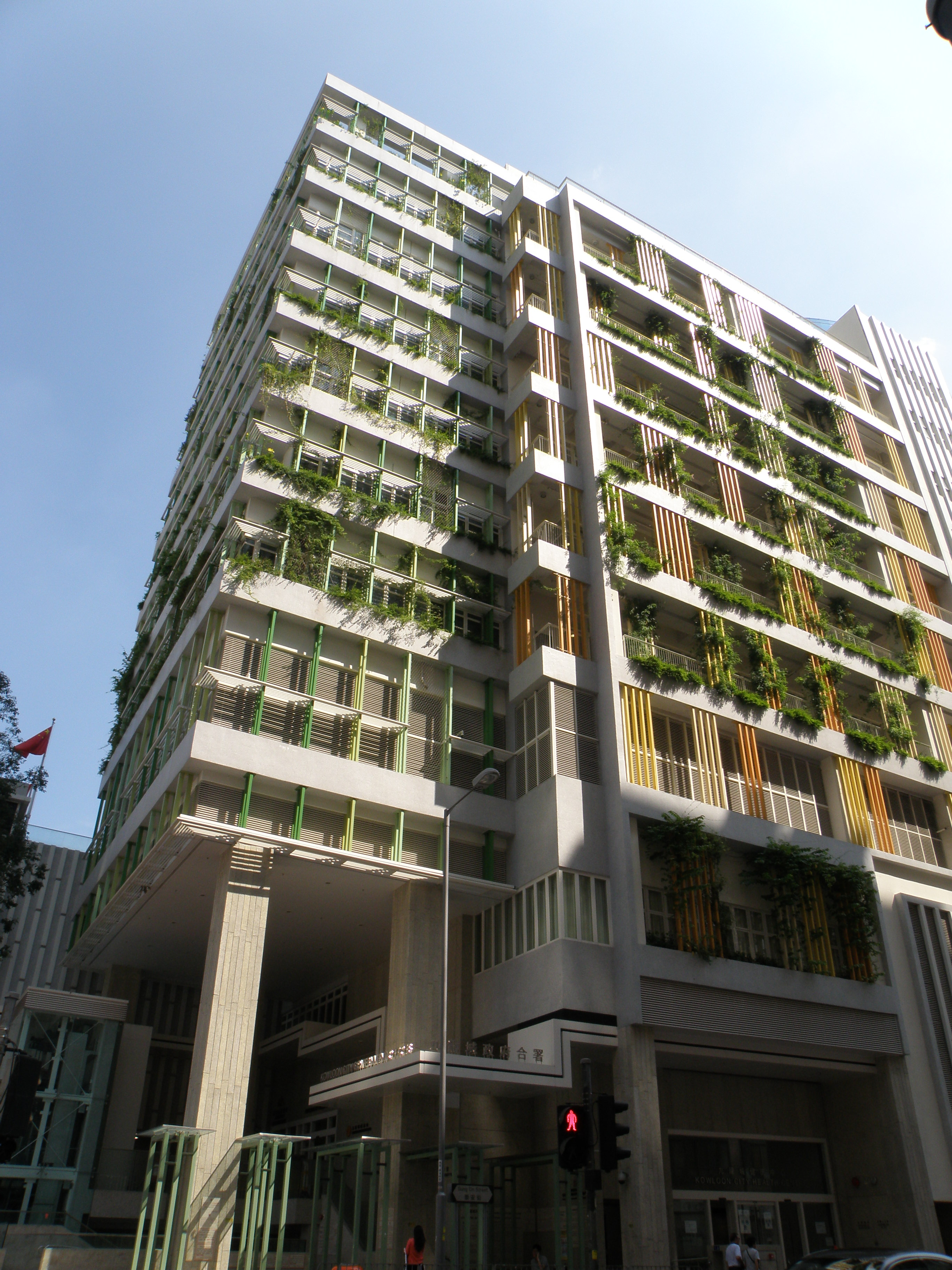
- 7/F, Kowloon City Government Offices, 42 Bailey Street, Hung Hom, Kowloon

Website
- www.districtcouncils.gov.hk/kc/

The Kowloon City District Council (Chinese: 九龍城區議會; noted as KC) is the district council for the Kowloon City District in Hong Kong. It is one of 18 such councils. The Kowloon City District Council currently consists of 20 members, of which the district is divided into 2 constituencies, electing a total of 4 members, 8 district committee members, and 8 appointed members. The last election was held on 10 December 2023.

== History ==
The Kowloon City District Council was established on 16 December 1981 under the name of the Kowloon City District Board as the result of the colonial Governor Murray MacLehose's District Administration Scheme reform. The District Board was partly elected with the ex-officio Urban Council members, as well as members appointed by the Governor until 1994 when last Governor Chris Patten refrained from appointing any member.

The Kowloon City District Board became Kowloon City Provisional District Board after the Hong Kong Special Administrative Region (HKSAR) was established in 1997 with the appointment system being reintroduced by Chief Executive Tung Chee-hwa. The current Kowloon City District Council was established on 1 January 2000 after the first District Council election in 1999. The council has become fully elected when the appointed seats were abolished in 2011 after the modified constitutional reform proposal was passed by the Legislative Council in 2010.

The Kowloon City District Council has been under control of the conservative and pro-Beijing camp and was the stronghold of the conservative Liberal Democratic Federation of Hong Kong (LDF) and its successor Hong Kong Progressive Alliance (HKPA) in the 1990s and the early 2000s until the party strength was heavily crippled in the 2003 election and was subsequently merged into the pro-Beijing Democratic Alliance for the Betterment and Progress of Hong Kong (DAB) in 2005. The LDF's main rival was the district-based Kowloon City Observers led by Ringo Chiang Sai-cheong in the 1990s until Chiang switched to the Liberal Party in the late 1990s. The pro-Taipei 123 Democratic Alliance also had their presence in the district, represented by its chairman Yum Sin-ling in Prince in the late 1990s.

Riding on the anti-government sentiments following the historic July 1 protest, the Democratic Party took over the Progressive Alliance as the largest party in the 2003 pro-democracy tide by winning seven seats in total. Together with the Association for Democracy and People's Livelihood (ADPL), the pro-democrats won the plurality of elected seats only being balanced by the government-appointed seats. By the end of the term, the number of seats commanded by the Democrats reduced to three and lost their largest party status to the DAB. The DAB since has become the largest party in the district, taking control of the council with the recently emerged Kowloon West New Dynamic, a district-based group uniting the pro-Beijing independents under Legislative Councillor Priscilla Leung, who was also the District Councillor for Whampoa East.

In the 2015 election, the new localist group Youngspiration which evolved from the 2014 Hong Kong protests contested in the Kowloon City District, with Yau Wai-ching unsuccessfully challenged Priscilla Leung with a narrow margin and Kwong Po-yin successfully ousted the incumbent council chairman Lau Wai-wing.

The pro-democrats scored a historic landslide victory in the 2019 election amid the massive pro-democracy protests, taking control of the council by securing 15 of the 25 seats. The Democratic Party emerged as the largest party, overtaking DAB with 10 seats.

== Political control ==
Since 1982 political control of the council has been held by the following parties:

Camp in control	Largest party	Years	Composition
No Overall Control	Civic Association	1982 - 1985	
Pro-government	Reform Club	1985 - 1988	
Pro-government	PHKS	1988 - 1991	
Pro-government	LDF	1991 - 1994	
Pro-Beijing	LDF	1994 - 1997	
Pro-Beijing	Progressive Alliance	1997 - 1999	
Pro-Beijing	Progressive Alliance	2000 - 2003	
Pro-Beijing	Democratic → DAB	2004 - 2007	
Pro-Beijing	DAB	2008 - 2011	
Pro-Beijing	DAB	2012 - 2015	
Pro-Beijing	DAB	2016 - 2019	
Pro-democracy → Pro-Beijing	Democratic → DAB	2020 - 2023	
Pro-Beijing	DAB	2024 - 2027	

== Political makeup ==

Elections are held every four years.

Political party	Council members							Current members
Political party	1994	1999	2003	2007	2011	2015	2019	Current members
Democratic	2	4	7	2	1	2	10	10 / 25
Independent	4	4	5	8	9	8	6	6 / 25
DAB	2	3	2	6	7	8	4	4 / 25
BPA	-	-	-	-	-	5	3	3 / 25
Liberal	2	4	3	2	1	1	1	1 / 25

== District result maps ==
1994

1999

2003

2007

2011

2015

2019

== Members represented ==
Capacity	Code	Constituency	Name	Political affiliation	Term		Notes
Elected	G01	Kowloon City North	Lam Pok	Independent	1 January 2024	Incumbent	
Elected	G01	Kowloon City North	Yeung Chun-yu	DAB	1 January 2024	Incumbent	
Elected	G02	Kowloon City South	Lee Chiu-yiu	BPA	1 January 2024	Incumbent	
Elected	G02	Kowloon City South	Ng Po-keung	DAB	1 January 2024	Incumbent	
District Committees			Chan Chi-wah	DAB	1 January 2024	Incumbent	
District Committees			Ng Po-keung	DAB	1 January 2024	Incumbent	
District Committees			Leung Yuen-ting	BPA	1 January 2024	Incumbent	
District Committees			Fung Mo-kwan	Independent	1 January 2024	Incumbent	
District Committees			Rita Lau Yuen-yin	Independent	1 January 2024	Incumbent	
District Committees			Wong Cho	Independent	1 January 2024	Incumbent	
District Committees			Cheung King-fan	Independent	1 January 2024	Incumbent	
District Committees			Ting Kin-wah	Independent	1 January 2024	Incumbent	
Appointed			Lam Tak-shing	DAB	1 January 2024	Incumbent	
Appointed			Poon Kwok-wah	DAB	1 January 2024	Incumbent	
Appointed			Felix Wong Man-kwong	FTU	1 January 2024	Incumbent	
Appointed			Steven Cho Wui-hung	BPA	1 January 2024	Incumbent	
Appointed			He Huahan	BPA	1 January 2024	Incumbent	
Appointed			Rizwan Ullah	Independent	1 January 2024	Incumbent	
Appointed			Vivian Wong Man-lei	Independent	1 January 2024	Incumbent	
Appointed			Lai Yin-chung	Independent	1 January 2024	Incumbent	

== Leadership ==
=== Chairs ===
Between 1985 and 2023, the chairman is elected by all the members of the council.

Chairman	Years	Political Affiliation
Lee Lap-sun	1981–1983	District Officer
G. W. E. Jones	1983–1985	District Officer
Wong Sik-kong	1985–1994	Nonpartisan
Tang Po-hong	1994–1999	LDF→PA
Liang Tin	2000–2003	Independent
Lau Wai-wing	2003	Independent
Peter Wong Kwok-keung	2004–2011	Independent
Lau Wai-wing	2012–2015	Independent
Pun Kwok-wah	2016–2019	DAB
Siu Leong-sing	2020–2021	Democratic
Yan Wing-kit	2021–2022	Independent
Ho Hin-ming	2022–2023	Liberal
Alice Choi Man-kwan	2024–present	District Officer

=== Vice Chairs ===
Vice Chairman	Years	Political Affiliation
Lau Wai-wing	2000–2003	Independent
Chan Ka-wai	2004–2007	Democratic
Lau Wai-wing	2008–2011	Independent
Pun Kwok-wah	2012–2015	DAB
Cho Wui-hung	2016–2019	Independent→KWND/BPA
Kwong Po-yin	2020–2021	Independent
Ho Hin-ming	2021–2022	Liberal
Ng Po-keung	2022–2023	Independent
