= Frederick Fung =

Hong Kong politician

Frederick Fung Kin-kee SBS, JP
- 馮檢基
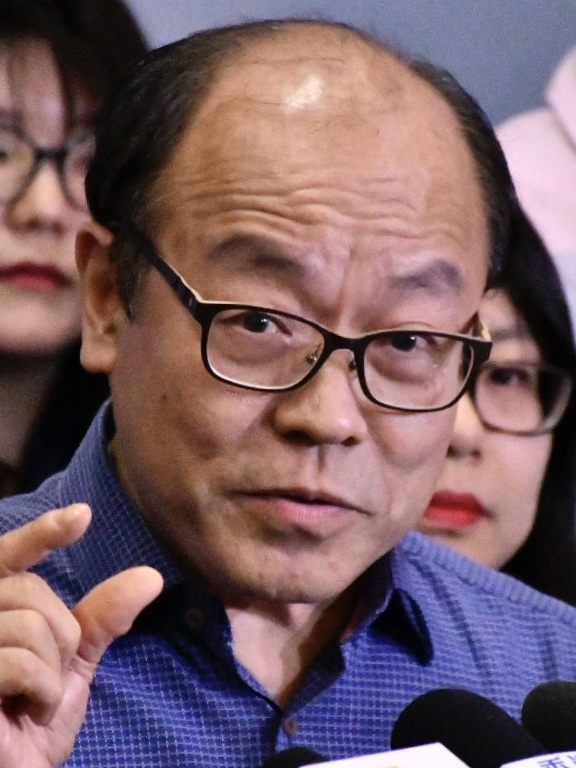

Member of the Legislative Council
- In office 1 October 2012 – 30 September 2016
- Preceded by: New constituency
- Succeeded by: Leung Yiu-chung
- Constituency: District Council (Second)
- In office 1 October 2000 – 30 September 2012
- Preceded by: New seat
- Succeeded by: Claudia Mo
- Constituency: Kowloon West
- In office 21 December 1996 – 30 June 1998 (Provisional Legislative Council)
- In office 9 October 1991 – 30 June 1997
- Preceded by: New constituency
- Succeeded by: Replaced by Provisional Legislative Council
- Constituency: Kowloon West

Chairman of the Association for Democracy and People's Livelihood
- In office 1989–2007
- Preceded by: Ding Lik-kiu
- Succeeded by: Bruce Liu

Personal details
- Born: 17 March 1953 (age 73) British Hong Kong
- Party: Association for Democracy and People's Livelihood (1986–2018)
- Spouse: Chan Man-chi
- Education: Bradford University (BA)
- Occupation: Legislative Councillor

Frederick Fung
- Traditional Chinese: 馮檢基
- Simplified Chinese: 冯检基
Transcriptions
Standard Mandarin
- Hanyu Pinyin: Fóng Jiǎnjī
Yue: Cantonese
- Yale Romanization: Fùhng Gím gēi
- Jyutping: Fung^{4} Gim^{2} gei^{1}

Frederick Fung Kin-kee, SBS, JP (Chinese: 馮檢基; born 17 March 1953) is a Hong Kong former politician who was a member of the Legislative Council of Hong Kong from 1991 to 1997 and from 2000 to 2016 and the former chairman of the pro-democracy Hong Kong Association for Democracy and People's Livelihood (ADPL) from 1989 to 2007.

Fung pioneered pro-democrats' participation in electoral politics by standing in the 1983 Urban Council election. As well as his role in the Urban Council, he was also a member of the Sham Shui Po District Council. He was first elected to the Legislative Council in the 1991 direct election. He is noted for his middle-of-the-road strategy of "simultaneously negotiating with and confronting" Beijing and joined the Beijing-installed Provisional Legislative Council in 1996 despite the pro-democrats' boycott. Fung was a candidate for the 2012 Chief Executive election but lost in the pro-democracy primary.

He resigned from the ADPL chairmanship after the party's defeat in the 2007 District Council election. He lost his Sham Shui Po District Council seat in 2015 and lost his re-election to the Legislative Council in 2016. Fung contested in the pro-democracy primary for the March 2018 Kowloon West by-election, but lost to Yiu Chung-yim. He subsequently declined to be a backup candidate for Yiu. He also drew the ire of former allies from the pro-democracy camp by standing in the November Kowloon West by-election, in a spoiler role against the camp's chosen candidate, Lee Cheuk-yan.

== Education and early political career ==
Fung was born in Hong Kong in 1953 with the family root of Dongguan. He entered the University of Hong Kong in 1974 but was ousted a year after because he spent too much time organising social movements and failed his exams. He then joined the pressure group Society for Community Organisation. He went to the United Kingdom in 1979 and obtained his undergraduate Bachelor of Arts degree in Social Policy and Public Administration at the University of Bradford in 1982.

After he returned to Hong Kong, he was noted as one of the pioneers of the pro-democrats to participate in the electoral politics, by running in the 1983 Urban Council election, the first free direct election for the municipal council. He won a seat in Sham Shui Po East with 7,450 votes, which established his long time base in the district. At the time he was the chairman of the Hong Kong People's Council on Public Housing Policy (PCPHP). In 1986, he co-founded the Hong Kong Association for Democracy and People's Livelihood (ADPL) as vice chairman. The ADPL became one of the three major pro-democracy political groups in the 1980s.

== Legislative career ==
=== British Hong Kong Colonial period ===
In 1989, he replaced Ding Lik-kiu as chairman of the ADPL. Under his chairmanship, he was initially involved in forming the United Democrats of Hong Kong, a political party which aimed to unite all democrats in 1990, but later on refused to join his fellow democrats to form the new party, citing his association represented grassroots' interest whereas the United Democrats were more focused on the "middle class". At the time he also served as a member in the Hong Kong Housing Authority from 1990 to 1998.

In the first ever direct elections for the Legislative Council of Hong Kong in 1991, he ran in Kowloon West and was elected to the legislature for the first time. A moderate pan-democrat, he is known for his middle-of-the-road strategy of "simultaneously negotiating with and confronting" Beijing, which, in his words, is to try to keep contact with the mainland authorities so you will have a chance to convince them to listen to your views. Such stance has been criticised by the mainstream and radical democrats as opportunistic and pulled him into controversy in the run-up to the 1997 handover. In 1996, he decided to join the Beijing-controlled Preparatory Committee for the Hong Kong Special Administrative Region and the Provisional Legislative Council with his party which created by Beijing as a counter legislature against the democratic legislature under Chris Patten, the last Governor of Hong Kong's electoral reform, while the other democrats boycotted the provisional legislature, criticising them as a backwards step for democracy.

=== HKSAR period ===
Amid criticism, Fung lost his seat in the 1998 Legislative Council election in Kowloon West, the first legislative election after the SAR was established along with all ADPL candidates. He returned to the Legislative Council in the 2nd Legislative Council election two years later in 2000 and was since re-elected in 2004, 2008 and 2012.

He was also member of the Sham Shui Po District Council from 1999 to 2015. He resigned as chairman of the ADPL after the 2007 District Council election, after his party received a disastrous defeat. In the 2015 District Council election, he lost his long held seat in Lai Kok to a 25-year old newcomer, Chan Wing-yan, of the pro-Beijing Hong Kong Federation of Trade Unions (FTU) and Democratic Alliance for the Betterment and Progress of Hong Kong with 99-vote margin, while former ADPL member Eric Wong Chung-ki stood in the constituency, taking away 215 votes.

On 8 December 2011, he decided to run for the 2012 Hong Kong Chief Executive election, but lost the primary election of the pan-democracy camp to Democratic Party's Albert Ho. In the 2012 Legislative Council election, he ran for the new territory-wide District Council (Second) functional constituency "super seat" which was created under the 2010 Hong Kong electoral reform he supported and successfully returned to the Legislative Council. Since was ineligible to run for the same constituency in 2016 Legislative Council election as he was unseated from his District Council seat in 2015. He chose to give up his long-time base in Kowloon West and ran in the New Territories West, but failed to win any seat. His decision caused criticism as he was blamed for snatching votes from other pro-democrat candidates including Lee Cheuk-yan which led to his downfall in his long time base.

== After Legislative Council ==
He participated in the pro-democracy primary of the March 2018 Kowloon West by-election after incumbent Yau Wai-ching of Youngspiration was ousted from the Legislative Council over the oath-taking controversy. His decision of running sparked intra-party conflicts. His candidacy was initially challenged by party's young member Kalvin Ho who later withdrew from the race. Former vice-chairwoman Rosanda Mok and all ADPL's Yau Tsim Mong and Kowloon City District Councillors quit the party in the midst of the intra-party primary, in protest against Fung's candidacy. Fung eventually became the party's sole representative in the pro-democracy primary. He was defeated in the telephone polls and generic ballots in the primary to Yiu Chung-yim, the legislator who was also disqualified over the oath-taking controversy. According to the primary mechanism, Fung was a backup candidate in case Yiu was barred from running in the election. However, announced that he was under pressure to withdraw as a backup candidacy as agreed in the primary if Yiu was disqualified by the Electoral Affair Commission. "Someone from the progressive democracy bloc told me that if I ran in the poll, they would definitely send someone as well [to challenge me]," Fung said. "I hope my withdrawal will allow the hatred to dissipate."

In October 2018, Fung announced that he was standing in the November Kowloon West by-election, three months after quitting the ADPL, which intended to back unity pro-democracy candidate Lau Siu-lai. Amid criticism from allies, he declared that he was unhappy that another veteran, Lee Cheuk-yan, was chosen by the pro-democracy camp as Lau's backup, rather than himself, in case she was barred from running. When Lau was in fact barred by the government, Fung began campaigning in earnest, risking a catastrophic split in the democratic vote, and seemingly unconcerned that fellow democrats called him a "spoiler", "sore loser", and "a has-been politician who cares more about his ego than the causes he claims to espouse". As a result, Fung received 12,509 votes, about five per cent of the total vote share while Beijing-backed Chan Hoi-yan won 106,457 votes, about 900 votes more than Fung and Lee combined.

Fung unsuccessfully ran for a seat on Yau Tsim Mong District Council, in Tsim Sha Tsui West constituency, during the 2019 local elections. He ran in the 2021 Hong Kong legislative election, but failed to win a seat.

== Election table ==
2021 Hong Kong LegCo election

Party	Candidates	Votes	Percentage
DAB	Vincent Cheng Wing-shun	64,353	54.93
Nonpartisan	Frederick Fung	15,961	13.62
KWND	Leung Man Kwong	36,840	31.45

== See also ==
- Politics of Hong Kong
- Democratic development in Hong Kong

Political offices
New constituency	Member of the Urban Council; Representative for Sham Shui Po East; 1983–1995	Succeeded by Tam Kwok-kiu
Preceded by Foo Wai-lok	Member of Sham Shui Po District Council; Representative for Shek Kip Mei; 2000–2003	Succeeded by Tam Kwok-kiu
Preceded by Tracy Lai Wai-lan	Member of Sham Shui Po District Council; Representative for Lai Kok; 2004–2015	Succeeded by Chan Wing-yan
Party political offices
Preceded by Ding Lik-kiu	Chairman of the Association for Democracy and People's Livelihood; 1989–2007	Succeeded by Bruce Liu
Legislative Council of Hong Kong
New constituency	Member of Legislative Council; Representative for Kowloon West; 1991–1997; With: James To (1991–1995)	Replaced by Provisional Legislative Council
New parliament	Member of Provisional Legislative Council; 1997–1998	Replaced by Legislative Council
New seat	Member of Legislative Council; Representative for Kowloon West; 2000–2012	Succeeded by Claudia Mo
New constituency	Member of Legislative Council; Representative for District Council (Second); 2012–2016	Succeeded by Leung Yiu-chung
