= 1988 Hong Kong local elections =

- 10 March 1988

All Elected Constituencies 264 (of the 462) seats in all 19 District Boards
- Registered: 1,610,998 ▲13.34%
- Turnout: 424,201 (30.26%) ▼7.22pp

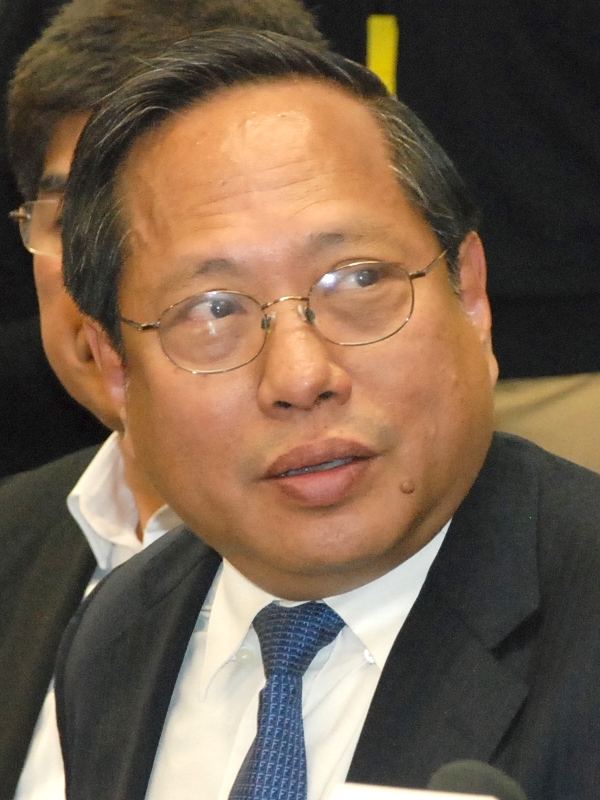

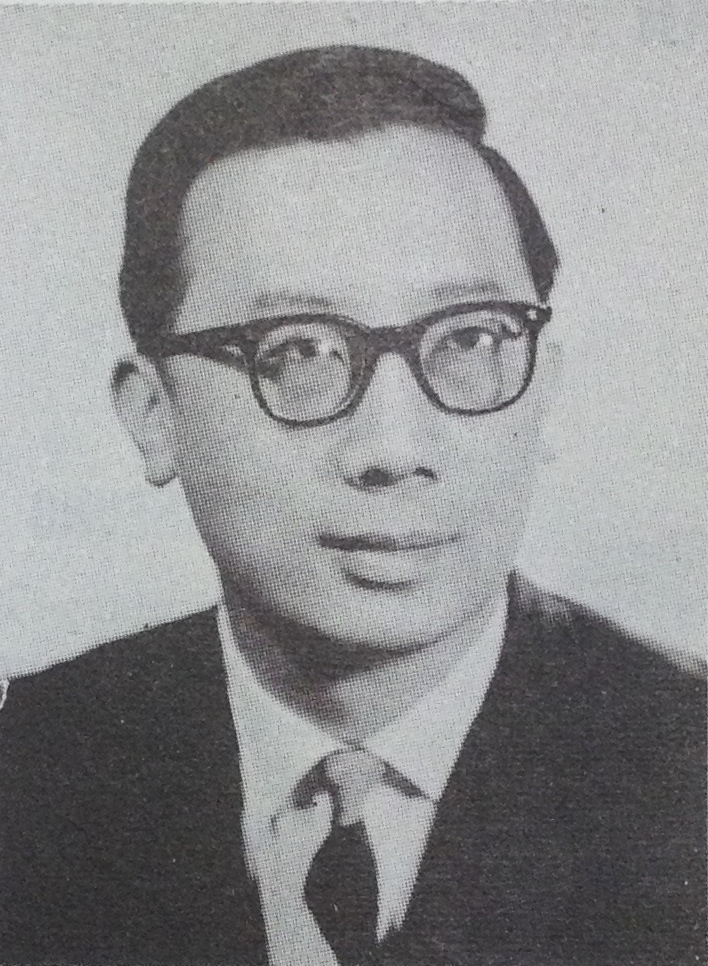

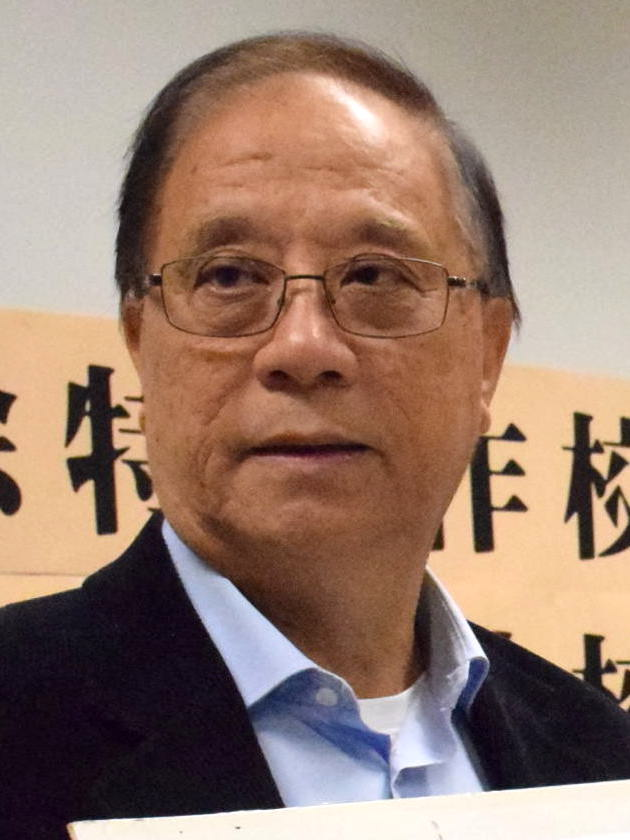

	First party	Second party	Third party
Leader	Ding Lik-kiu	Albert Ho	Hilton Cheong-Leen
Party	ADPL	HKAS	Civic
Last election	New party	4 seats, 0.60%	20 seats, 5.57%
Seats won	27	17	16
Seat change	▲13	▲8	▲3
Popular vote	65,338	36,666	42,397
Percentage	10.25%	5.75%	6.65%
Swing	N/A	▲5.15pp	▼2.11pp
	Fourth party	Fifth party	Sixth party
Leader	Yeung Sum	Brook Bernacchi	Yeung Kwong
Party	Meeting Point	Reform	FTU
Last election	4 seats, 1.40%	17 seats, 6.36%	Did not contest
Seats won	16	2	2
Seat change	▲12	Steady	Steady
Popular vote	41,878	9,570	3,360
Percentage	6.57%	1.50%	0.53%
Swing	▲5.16pp	▼4.86pp	N/A

The 1988 Hong Kong District Board elections were the third district board elections held on 10 March 1988. Election was held to all 19 districts of Hong Kong (in which Yau Tsim District and Mong Kok District later merged into today's Yau Tsim Mong District), for 264 members from directly elected constituencies while there were 141 appointed seats and respectively 30 and 27 ex officio members representing the Urban Council and rural committees in New Territories.

== Overview ==
The election oversaw the increasing influence of the political groups in the local elections. The three major emerging pro-democratic groups, which later evolved into today's pro-democracy camp, the Meeting Point, Association for Democracy and People's Livelihood and Hong Kong Affairs Society were the strategic allies against the conservative kaifong leaders in the election. The older political organisation, the Hong Kong Civic Association cooperated with Maria Tam's Progressive Hong Kong Society, while the Progressive Hong Kong Society and the pro-Beijing leftist Hong Kong Federation of Trade Unions remained in low-profile in the election.

Some candidates who used to be closely associated with older conservative groups were switching over to the younger liberal camps, such as Vivien Chan stood for the Reform Club of Hong Kong in 1985 and was claimed to be one of the influential members in the club had moved over to the Hong Kong Affairs Society. Tony Kan Chung-nin had also swung away from Maria Tam's conservative Progressive Hong Kong Society to the liberal Hong Kong Affairs Society.

In this election, the Meeting Point had built a power base in Tuen Mun while the Association for Democracy and People's Livelihood in Sham Shui Po. The Hong Kong Affairs Society had its power base in Sha Tin while it tried to test their strength in the Eastern District, Wan Chai and Central and Western District, and tried to break the dominance of the older conservative Civic Association. The Reform Club tried to recapture a power base in the Eastern District under the umbrella of Brook Bernacchi and concentrated its resources in Yau Ma Tei under Kwan Lim-ho.

The turnout rate of 30.31 per cent was recorded, 7 points lower than the last election in 1985.

== General outcome ==
Overall Summary of the 10 March 1988 District Boards of Hong Kong election results
Political Affiliation	Popular vote	%	Standing	Elected
Hong Kong Association for Democracy and People's Livelihood	65,338	10.25	32	27
Hong Kong Affairs Society	36,666	5.75	22	17
Hong Kong Civic Association	42,397	6.65	31	16
Meeting Point	41,878	6.57	23	16
Reform Club of Hong Kong	9,570	1.50	7	2
Hong Kong Federation of Trade Unions	3,360	0.53	2	2
Independent and others	438,190	68.75	376	183
Total (turnout 30.3%)	637,399	100.0	493	264
