= Sham Shui Po District Council =

Hong Kong district council

Coordinates: 22.3319°N 114.1635°E

Sham Shui Po District Council 深水埗區議會

Type
- Type: Hong Kong District Council of the Sham Shui Po District

History
- Founded: 22 October 1981 (District Board); 1 July 1997 (Provisional); 1 January 2000 (District Council)

Leadership
- Chair: Paul Wong Yan-yin, Independent

Structure
- Seats: 20 councillors consisting of 4 elected members 8 district committee members 8 appointed members
- DAB: 8 / 20
- BPA: 3 / 20
- FLU: 2 / 20
- Independent: 7 / 20

Elections
- Voting system: First past the post
- Last election: 10 December 2023

Meeting place
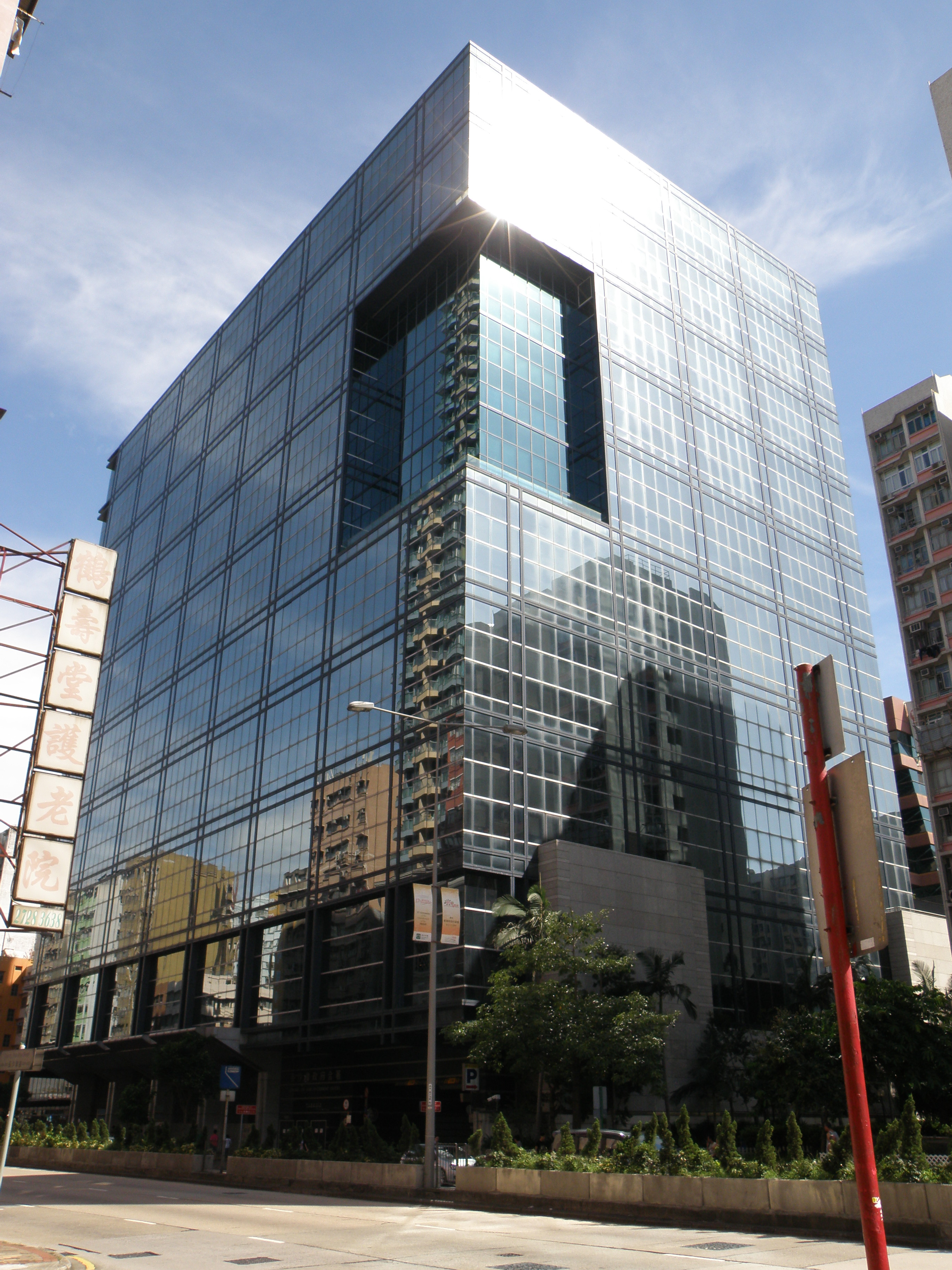
- 4/F Cheung Sha Wan Government Offices, 303 Cheung Sha Wan Road, Kowloon

Website
- www.districtcouncils.gov.hk/ssp/

Sham Shui Po District Council
- Traditional Chinese: 深水埗區議會
Transcriptions
Yue: Cantonese
- Yale Romanization: Sām séui bóu kēui yíh wúih
- Jyutping: Sam1 seoi2 bou2 koei1 ji5 wui5

The Sham Shui Po District Council (noted as SSP) is the district council for the Sham Shui Po District in Hong Kong. It is one of 18 such councils. The Sham Shui Po District Council currently consists of 20 members, of which the district is divided into two constituencies, electing a total of 4 members, 8 district committee members, and 8 appointed members. The last election was held on 10 December 2023.

== History ==
The Sham Shui Po District Council was established on 22 October 1981 under the name of the Sham Shui Po District Board as the result of the colonial Governor Murray MacLehose's District Administration Scheme reform. The District Board was partly elected with the ex-officio Urban Council members, as well as members appointed by the Governor until 1994 when last Governor Chris Patten refrained from appointing any member.

The Sham Shui Po District Board became Sham Shui Po Provisional District Board after the Hong Kong Special Administrative Region (HKSAR) was established in 1997 with the appointment system being reintroduced by Chief Executive Tung Chee-hwa. The current Sham Shui Po District Council was established on 1 January 2000 after the first District Council election in 1999. The council has become fully elected when the appointed seats were abolished in 2011 after the modified constitutional reform proposal was passed by the Legislative Council in 2010.

Partly because of the large presence of the low-income group in Sham Shui Po, the area has bred many pro-grassroots politicians. Social activists from the grassroots political groups Hong Kong People's Council on Public Housing Policy and the Sham Shui Po Residents Livelihood Concern Group had their roots in the district, which later formed the Hong Kong Association for Democracy and People's Livelihood (ADPL), one of the earlier pro-democracy political groups in the 1980s.

With the strong presence of the ADPL in the district, the ADPL gained majority of the council from 1994 to 1997 and took control of the council from 2000 to 2007 with its pro-democracy allies. It also returned its longtime chairman Frederick Fung in the Kowloon West constituency, in which Sham Shui Po is the biggest area, to the Legislative Council from 1991 to 1997 and from 1998 to 2012.

However, Hong Kong's largest pro-government and pro-Beijing party, the Democratic Alliance for the Betterment of Hong Kong (DAB), gained a foothold in Sham Shui Po in recent years with large amount of resources. In the 2007 District Council election, the pan-democrats lost control of the council for the first time, in which the seats commanded by pro-democracy and pro-Beijing forces were split even with the help of the government-appointed seats. The ADPL suffered further loss in the 2011 District Council election, losing the control of the council to the pro-Beijing camp.

In the 2015 District Council election, the district's first election after Umbrella Revolution, the pan-democrats regained almost half of the seats in the district council with 11 seats in their possession. as composed to pro-Beijing camp's 12 seats, despite the downfall of Frederick Fung in his Lai Kok constituency, being defeated by a DAB new face Chan Wing-yan.

Amid the massive pro-democracy protests, the pro-democrats scored a historic landslide victory by taking 22 of the 25 seats in the 2019 District Council election. The ADPL retained the status of the largest party, securing 11 seats in total.

== Current Members ==
Capacity	Code	Constituency	Name	Political affiliation	Term		Notes
Elected	F01	Sham Shui Po West	Leo Ho Kwan-chau	DAB	1 January 2024	Incumbent	
Elected	F01	Sham Shui Po West	Wu Sze-wan	Independent	1 January 2024	Incumbent	
Elected	F02	Sham Shui Po East	Raymond Lam Wai-man	DAB	1 January 2024	Incumbent	
Elected	F02	Sham Shui Po East	Chan Kwok-wai	BPA	1 January 2024	Incumbent	
District Committees			Wu Wanqiu	DAB	1 January 2024	Incumbent	
District Committees			Cheung Tak-wai	DAB	1 January 2024	Incumbent	
District Committees			Chan Lung-kit	DAB	1 January 2024	Incumbent	
District Committees			Jeffrey Pong Chiu-fai	BPA	1 January 2024	Incumbent	
District Committees			Chen Lihong	FLU	1 January 2024	Incumbent	
District Committees			Leung Ping-kin	Independent	1 January 2024	Incumbent	
District Committees			Chum Pik-wa	Independent	1 January 2024	Incumbent	
District Committees			Hanson Wong Chun-hung	Independent	1 January 2024	Incumbent	
Appointed			Samuel Chan Wai-ming	DAB	1 January 2024	Incumbent	
Appointed			Wong Chung-leung	DAB	1 January 2024	Incumbent	
Appointed			Nicole Lau Pui-yuk	DAB	1 January 2024	Incumbent	
Appointed			Aaron Lam Ka-fai	BPA	1 January 2024	Incumbent	
Appointed			Lee Wing-man	FLU	1 January 2024	Incumbent	
Appointed			Kwok Yin-lai	Independent	1 January 2024	Incumbent	
Appointed			Chung Ching-may	Independent	1 January 2024	Incumbent	
Appointed			Lo Chi-chiu	Independent	1 January 2024	Incumbent	

== Political control ==
Since 1982 political control of the council has been held by the following parties:

Camp in control	Largest party	Years	Composition
No Overall Control	PCPHP	1982 - 1985	
Pro-government	Civic Association	1985 - 1988	
Pro-government	ADPL	1988 - 1991	
Pro-government	ADPL	1991 - 1994	
Pro-democracy	ADPL (majority)	1994 - 1997	
Pro-democracy	ADPL	1997 - 1999	
Pro-democracy	ADPL	2000 - 2003	
Pro-democracy	ADPL	2004 - 2007	
No Overall Control	ADPL	2008 - 2011	
Pro-Beijing	ADPL	2012 - 2015	
Pro-Beijing → NOC	ADPL	2016 - 2019	
Pro-democracy	ADPL	2020 - 2023	
Pro-Beijing	DAB	2024 - 2027	

== Political makeup ==

Elections are held every four years.

Political party	Council members						
Political party	1994	1999	2003	2007	2011	2015	2019
ADPL	11	10	13	10	7	9	11
Independent	3	4	4	5	9	1	6
DAB	0	3	1	3	4	5	2
Democratic	3	3	2	2	0	1	2
CSWCEP	-	-	-	-	-	0	1
CSWWF	-	-	-	-	-	-	1

== District result maps ==
1994

1999

2003

2007

2011

2015

2019

== Leadership ==
=== Chairs ===
Between 1985 and 2023, the chairman is elected by all the members of the council.

Chairman	Years	Political Affiliation
Stephen Ip	1981–1983	District Officer
M. J. White	1983	District Officer
Tse Tak-kan	1983–1985	District Officer
Stephen Cheng Po-hong	1985–1991	Nonpartisan
Raymond Choy Wai-shek	1991–1994	LDF
Eric Wong Chung-ki	1994–1997	ADPL
Tam Kwok-kiu	1997–2007	ADPL
Chan Tung	2008–2011	Independent
Jimmy Kwok Chun-wah	2012–2015	ES→BPA
Ambrose Cheung Wing-sum	2016–2019	Independent
Yeung Yuk	2020–2021	ADPL
Chum Tak-shing	2021–2023	ADPL
Paul Wong Yan-yin	2024–present	District Officer

=== Vice Chairs ===
Vice Chairman	Years	Political Affiliation
Chan Tung	2000–2003	Independent
Leung Lai	2004–2007	ADPL
Tam Kwok-kiu	2008–2011	ADPL
Wong Tat-tung	2012–2015	DAB
Chan Wai-ming	2016–2019	DAB
Ng Yuet-lan	2020–2023	Civic→Independent
