= Hong Kong Association for Democracy and People's Livelihood =

Hong Kong Association for Democracy and People's Livelihood 香港民主民生協進會
- Abbreviation: ADPL
- Chairman: Bruce Liu
- Vice-Chairmen: Howard Lee
- Founded: 26 October 1986; 39 years ago
- Headquarters: Rm. 1104, Sunbeam; Commercial Bldg., 469–471 Nathan Road, Yau Ma Tei, Kowloon, Hong Kong
- Membership (2018): ~80
- Ideology: Liberalism (HK); Social democracy Social liberalism
- Political position: Centre-left
- Regional affiliation: Pro-democracy camp
- Colours: Yellow and green
- Legislative Council: 0 / 90
- District Councils: 0 / 470

Website
- www.adpl.org.hk

Hong Kong Association for Democracy and People's Livelihood
- Traditional Chinese: 香港民主民生協進會
- Simplified Chinese: 香港民主民生协进会
Transcriptions
Standard Mandarin
- Hanyu Pinyin: Xiānggǎng mínzhǔ mínshēng xié jìn huì
Yue: Cantonese
- Yale Romanization: Hēung góng Màhn jyú Màhn sāng Hip Jeun Wuih
- Jyutping: Hoeng1 gong2 man4 zyu2 man4 sang1 hip3 zeon3 wui6*2

Alternative Chinese name
- Traditional Chinese: 民協
- Simplified Chinese: 民协
Transcriptions
Standard Mandarin
- Hanyu Pinyin: Mín Xié
Yue: Cantonese
- Yale Romanization: Màhn hip
- Jyutping: Man4 hip3

The Hong Kong Association for Democracy and People's Livelihood (ADPL) is a Hong Kong pro-democracy social-liberal political party catering to grassroots interest with a strong basis in Sham Shui Po. Established on 26 October 1986, it was one of the three major pro-democracy groups along with the Meeting Point and the Hong Kong Affairs Society in the 1980s.

The ADPL survived through the great unification of the pro-democracy camp in 1991 and became the only pro-democracy party to sit in the Beijing-controlled Provisional Legislative Council in 1997. It was ousted for the first time in the 1998 Legislative Council election. Its veteran former chairman Frederick Fung was the only legislator for the ADPL until he was defeated in the 2016 Legislative Council election in which the party was ousted from the legislature for the second time.

== Stances ==
The stated aims of the ADPL are to:

- Strive for a high degree of autonomy in Hong Kong under Chinese sovereignty and to implement the "one country, two systems" principle;
- Advocate democracy, fight for full implementation of direct elections for the Legislative Council, safeguard basic human rights and freedoms of Hong Kong people and preserve Hong Kong's judicial independence;
- Maintain Hong Kong's prosperity and stability and promote economic development in Hong Kong; and
- Distribute social resources fairly, improving the quality of life of the less well-off.

Within the pro-democracy camp, the ADPL is usually considered more moderate. Besides demanding universal suffrage, it emphasises livelihood issues and has supported an increase in profits and salaries taxes while opposing sales tax, a stance more favourable to lower income groups. The party has also called for an increase in education and coverage of medical expenses.

== History ==
=== Founding ===
The ADPL was founded on 26 October 1986 as a political organisation by a group of incumbent Urban Councillors, District Board members, members from mainly four grassroots organisations and professionals, the Association for Democracy and Justice, the Society for Social Research, the New Hong Kong Society, the Hong Kong People's Council on Public Housing Policy, the Septentrio Academy and the Sham Shui Po Residents Livelihood Concern Group. The founding chairman was Ding Lik-kiu and vice-chairmen were Frederick Fung and Lee Wing-tat.

=== Late colonial period ===
Initially, the ADPL engaged in the electoral reform debate, advocating direct election of the legislature in 1988. It supported the liberal proposals put forward by the Group of 190 coalition. The ADPL was one of the three major pro-democracy groups and performed fairly well in the local and municipal elections the 1980s with its strategic allies the Meeting Point and the Hong Kong Affairs Society. At its peak, it had 140 members, 28 District Board members, one Legislative Councillor, 5 municipal councillors.

In 1990, some leading figures of the ADPL such as vice-chairmen Lee Wing-tat and Albert Chan joined the United Democrats of Hong Kong, which later became the Democratic Party. The ADPL retained its separate identity, arguing that it represented grassroots interests whereas the United Democrats were more focused on the middle class. However, as many members joined the new party, the ADPL's membership dropped significantly to only 70 members, 15 District Board members and two municipal councillors.

As the ADPL chairman Frederick Fung was elected to the Legislative Council in the 1991 direct election and other members were elected to municipal councils, the ADPL stabilised and matured from a political organisation to a political party in 1992. It won one seat in the first direct election of the Legislative Council of Hong Kong (LegCo) in 1991 when Fung was elected. In the 1995 election, the party won four seats. At the time, due to near-parity of representation between the pro-Beijing and pro-democracy camps in Legco, the stance of the moderate ADPL was influential and often pivotal on controversial issues.

On the issue of the establishment of the Provisional Legislative Council, the ADPL initially opposed but then agreed to join the interim body. This led to a group of 16 members leaving to form the Social Democratic Front. ADPL became the only pro-democracy party in the legislature immediately after the establishment of the HKSAR, keeping four members in the interim body. ADPL members also served on the Preparatory Committee for the establishment of the HKSAR.

=== After 1997 ===
The ADPL lost all its seats in the 1998 Legco election. In the 2000 election, long-time chairman Frederick Fung recovered his directly elected seat in Legco for the ADPL.

At the district level, ADPL traditionally enjoyed a concentration of support in the Sham Shui Po District, with numerous seats across other District councils in the 1990s but it largely lost its influence outside of Sham Shui Po in the early 2000s. The party's seats mainly concentrated in Sham Shui Po, followed by Yau Tsim Mong and Kowloon City Districts in Kowloon West, where Frederick Fung retook his Legco seat in, as well as Wong Tai Sin and Tuen Mun. Following a poor showing in the 2007 District Council elections, Fung resigned as chairman and was replaced by Bruce Liu.

The ADPL supported the controversial electoral reform package which created five seats in the District Council (Second) functional constituencies which are nominated by District Councillors and elected by all registered voters. In a pan-democrat primary, Fung stood in the 2012 Chief Executive election but was defeated by the Democratic Party's Albert Ho. He was subsequently re-elected in the new constituency in the 2012 Legco election. Tam Kwok-kiu, however, failed to succeed Fung in Kowloon West, the ADPL's stronghold, its first loss there since 1998.

In the 2015 District Council election, the ADPL won 18 seats while veteran Frederick Fung lost his seat in Lai Kok to Chan Wing-yan of the Democratic Alliance for the Betterment and Progress of Hong Kong (DAB) and Hong Kong Federation of Trade Unions (FTU). Former party member Eric Wong Chung-ki also contested the constituency. On 23 January 2016, Rosanda Mok, former vice-chairman of the party, was elected the party's first female chairperson.

=== Ousted from the LegCo and split ===
Fung ran in the New Territories West after losing his eligibility to run in District Council (Second) in the 2016 Legislative Council election, while his party colleague Tam Kwok-kiu ran in Kowloon West for the second time. Kalvin Ho, a new Sham Shui Po District Councillor represented the ADPL to run in the District Council (Second). Both Fung and Tam lost in the election while Ho withdrew from the campaign to boost other pro-democrat candidates' chance to win. As a result, the ADPL was ousted from the legislature for the second time. Rosanda Mok resigned for the election defeat. In December, the party elected Sze Tak-loy as its new chairman.

Around the end of 2016, the ADPL's six district councillors, which included all its members from Yau Tsim Mong District Council and Kowloon City District Council, quit the party in a disputes concerning the intra-party primary for the March 2018 Kowloon West by-election, in which Frederick Fung intended to run, leaving the ADPL with only 12 District Councillors. Kalvin Ho, who also intended to run in the primary, later withdrew. As the party resolved to nominate Fung, former chairperson Rosanda Mok also left the party in June 2017. After losing to Yiu Chung-yim in the primary, Fung announced he would not become the backup candidate if Yiu's candidacy was disqualified amid alleged pressure from the progressive democrats forcing him to withdraw. On 12 July 2018, Fung announced his departure from the ADPL amid speculation that he was going to run for the November Kowloon West by-election as the party intended to back Lau Siu-lai.

=== Post National Security Law ===
Chairman Kalvin Ho and vice-chairman Sze Tak-loy was charged with subversion under the National Security Law in 2021, resigned respectively later after bail granted by court. Yeung Yuk became the acting chairman of ADPL. On 15 October 2021, amidst a crackdown on pro-Democracy political parties and organizations after the enactment of the Hong Kong national security law in 2020, the ADPL allowed members to sign up and contest in the 2021 Hong Kong legislative election. While Bruce Liu signaled his interest in running again for the seat, none of the members signed up. The defeat of all moderates and democrats in the election marked by low turnout pressured Yeung, who supported Frederick Fung in the campaign and angered some pro-democracy activists, to resign as the acting chair of the party, citing his wish to focus on local issues. Bruce Liu was elected as the new chairman on 16 April 2022.

ADPL intended to join the elections by filling two candidates in the 2023 District Council elections after the election system was overhauled, but neither of the candidates was able to get nominations from the members of the "three committees", many of which came from the pro-Beijing parties. Bruce Liu said that the ADPL has entered the "desert stage", describing the current regional administration as being like Shenzhen's system. The party planned to convene a press conference to discuss the aftermath of the 2025 Wang Fuk Court fire, but was cancelled after the chairperson Liu and vice-chairman Howard Lee was brought to the police station by the national security police.

== Electoral performance ==
=== Chief Executive elections ===
Election	Candidate	# of votes	% of votes
2012	Frederick Fung	Lost primary	

=== Legislative Council elections ===
Election	Number of popular votes	% of popular votes	GC seats	FC seats	EC seats	Total seats	+/−	Position
1991	60,770	4.44	1	0	–	1 / 60	0	5th▲
1995	87,072▲	9.50▲	2	1	1	4 / 60	3▲	4th▼
1998	59,034▼	3.99▼	0	0	0	0 / 60	–	–
2000	62,717▲	4.75▲	1	0	1	1 / 60	1▲	7th▲
2004	74,671▲	4.18▼	1	0		1 / 60	0	4th▲
2008	42,211▼	2.79▼	1	0		1 / 60	0	7th▲
2012	30,634▼	1.69▼	0	1		1 / 70	0	10th▼
2016	33,255▲	1.53▼	0	0		0 / 70	1▼	–
2021	Did not contest		–	–	–	0 / 90	–	–
2025	Did not contest		–	–	–	0 / 90	–	–

Note: Each voter got two votes in the 1991 Election.

=== Municipal elections ===
Election	Number of popular votes	% of popular votes	UrbCo seats	RegCo seats	Total elected seats
1989	21,243	9.99	2 / 15	2 / 12	4 / 27
1991	21,033▼	5.37▼	2 / 15	0 / 12	2 / 27
1995	38,918▲	6.98▲	5 / 32	3 / 27	8 / 59

=== District Council elections ===
Election	Number of popular votes	% of popular votes	Total elected seats	+/−
1988	65,338	10.25	27 / 264	13▲
1991	27,979▼	5.26▼	15 / 272	3▲
1994	47,740▲	6.95▲	29 / 346	12▲
1999	38,119▼	4.70▼	19 / 390	1▲
2003	53,264▲	5.07▲	25 / 400	4▲
2007	52,386▲	4.60▼	17 / 405	7▼
2011	45,453▼	3.85▼	15 / 412	1▼
2015	55,275▲	3.82▼	18 / 431	2▲
2019	77,099▲	2.63▼	19 / 452	7▲
2023	Did not contest		0 / 470	6▼

== Leadership ==
=== Chairpersons ===
- Ding Lik-kiu, 1986–89
- Frederick Fung, 1989–2007
  - Bruce Liu, acting 2007–08
- Bruce Liu, 2008–16
- Rosanda Mok, 2016
  - Sze Tak-loy, acting 2016
- Sze Tak-loy, 2016–21
  - Yeung Yuk, acting 2021
- Bruce Liu, 2022–Present

=== Vice Chairpersons ===
- Frederick Fung, 1986–89
- Lee Wing-tat, 1986–89
- Law Cheung-kwok, 1989–98
- Leung Kwong-cheong, 1989–96
- Bruce Liu, 1996–2007
- Yim Tin-sang, 1998–2008
- Tam Kwok-kiu, 2008–16
- Rosanda Mok, 2008–13
- Wong Chi-yung, 2013–14
- Pius Yum, 2014–16
- Sze Tak-loy, 2016
- Kalvin Ho, 2016–2021
  - Howard Lee, acting 2021–22
- Yeung Yuk, 2016–21
- Howard Lee, 2022–Present
