= 2015 Hong Kong local elections =

- 22 November 2015

All Elected Constituencies 431 (of the 458) seats in all 18 Districts Councils
- Registered: 3,693,942 ▲3.75%
- Turnout: 1,467,229 (47.01%) ▲5.52pp
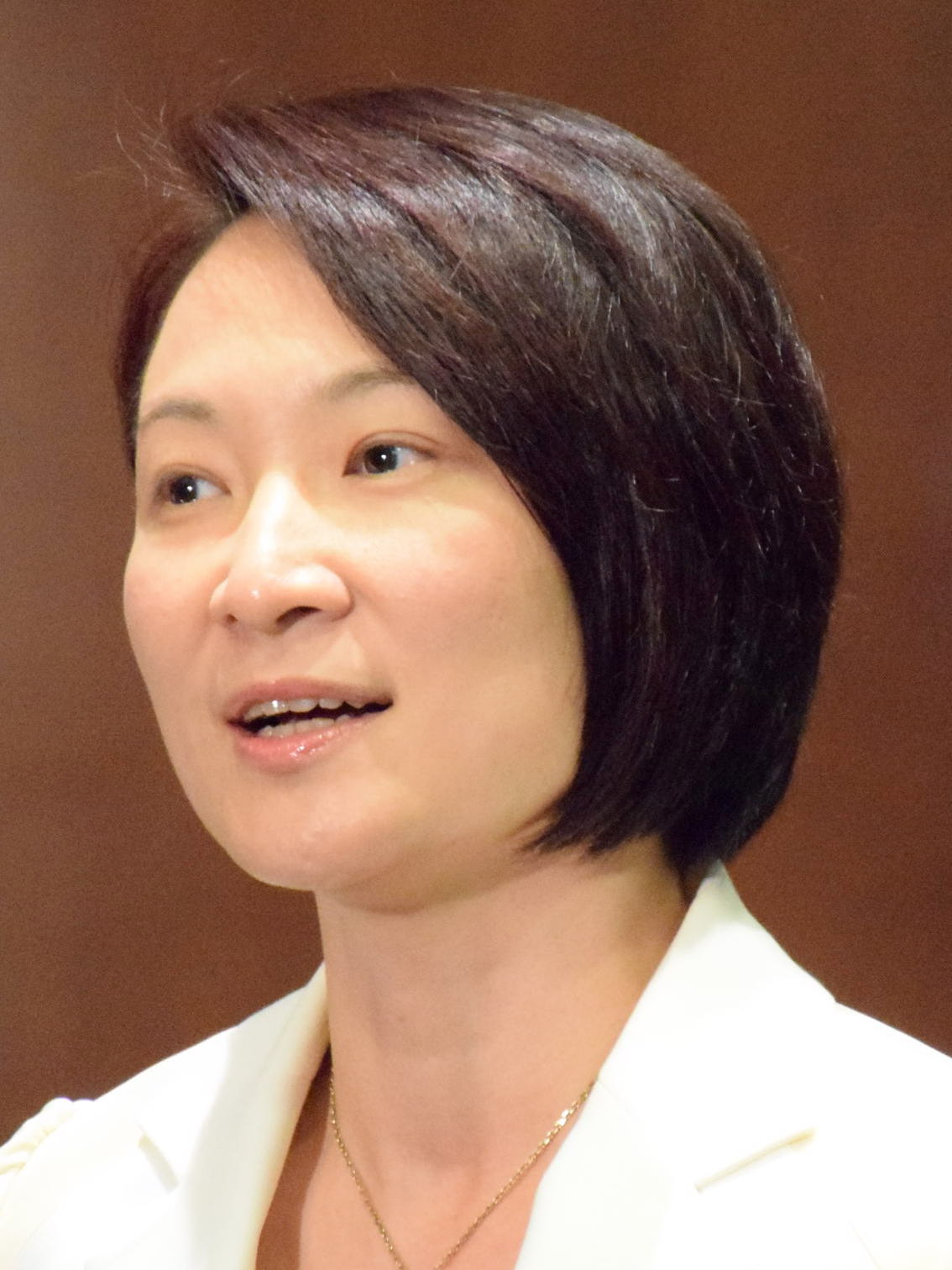

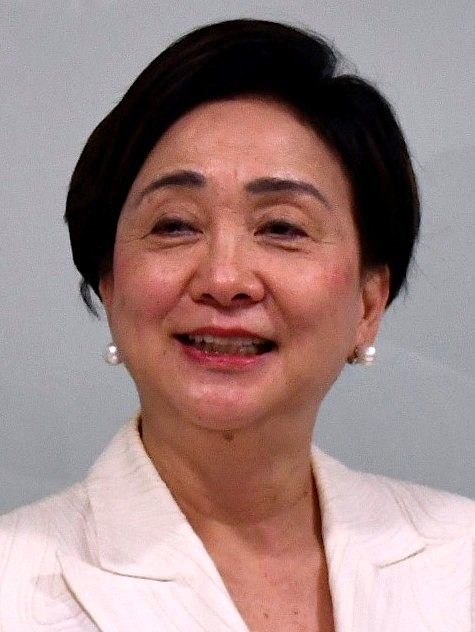

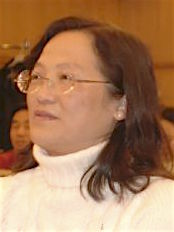

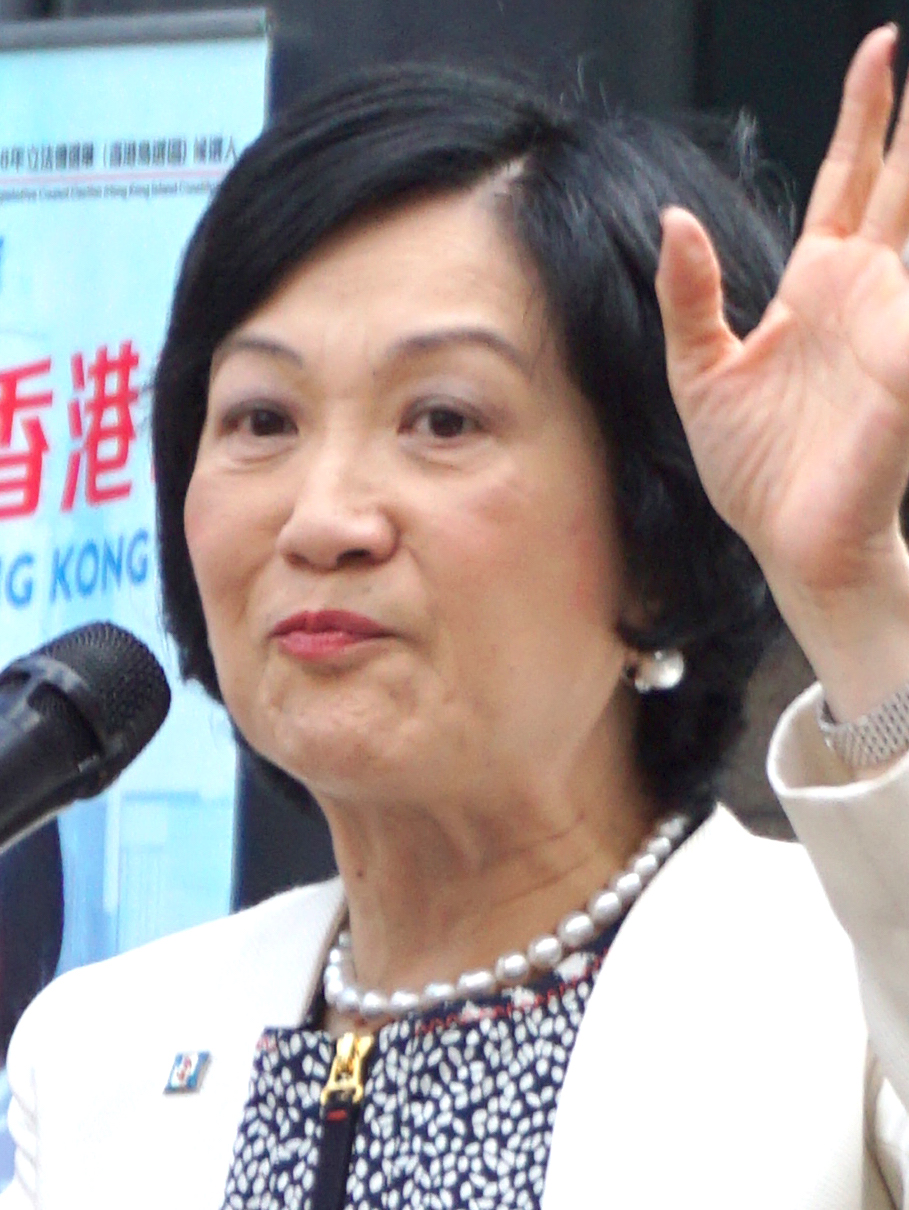

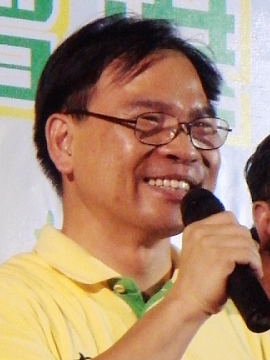

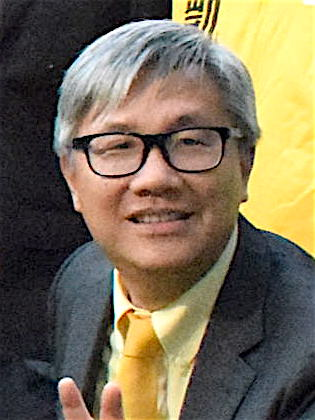

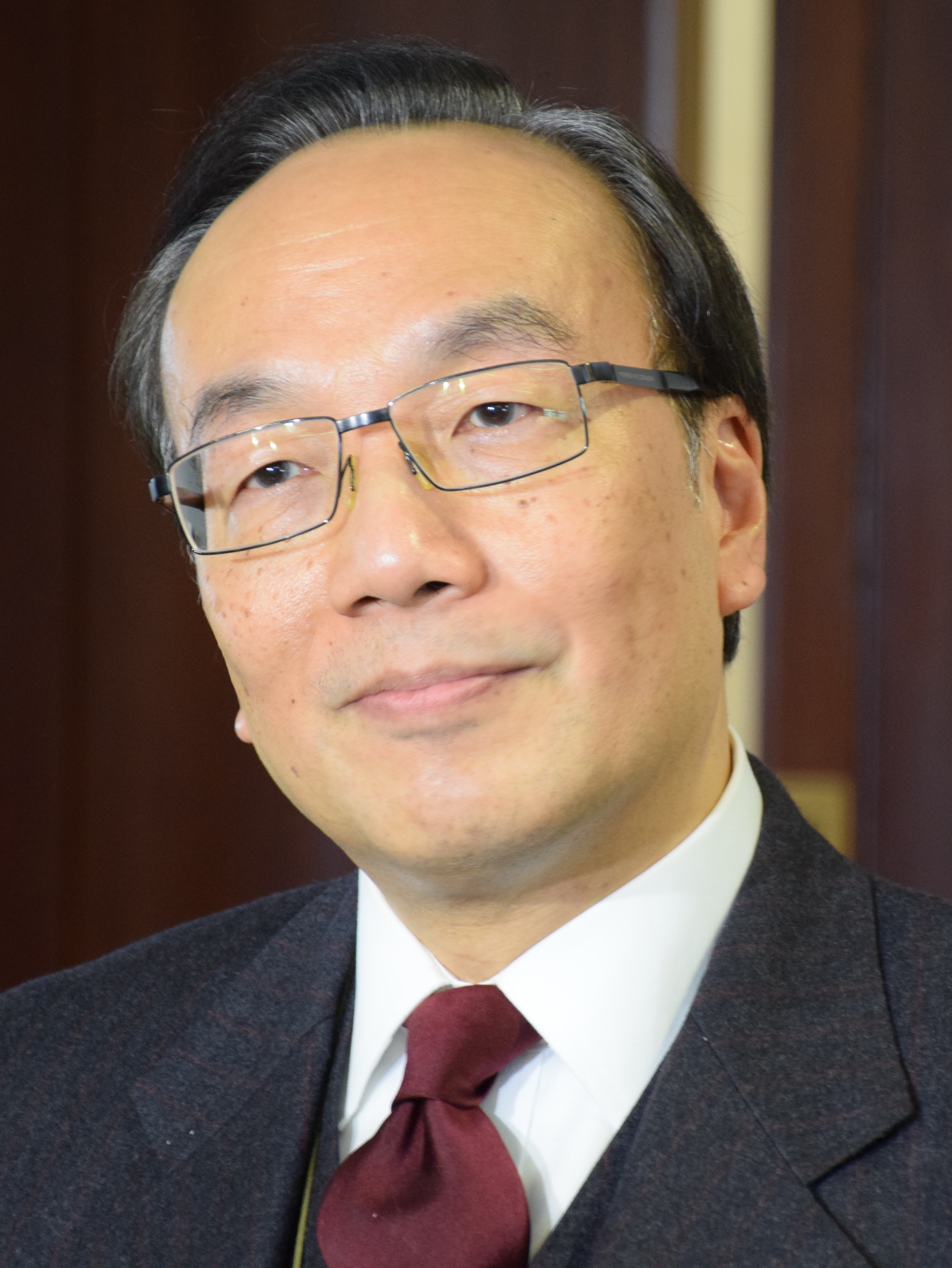

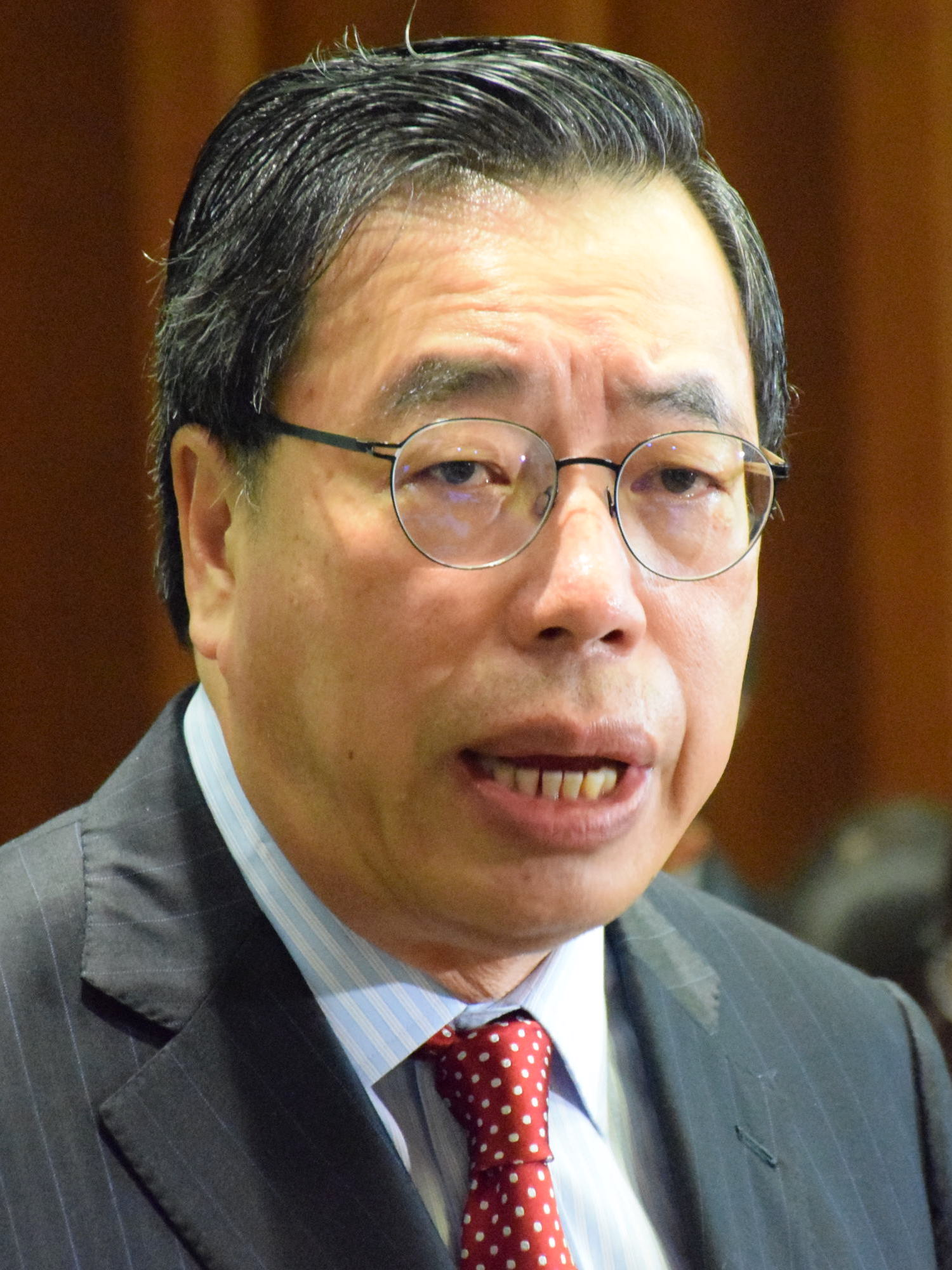

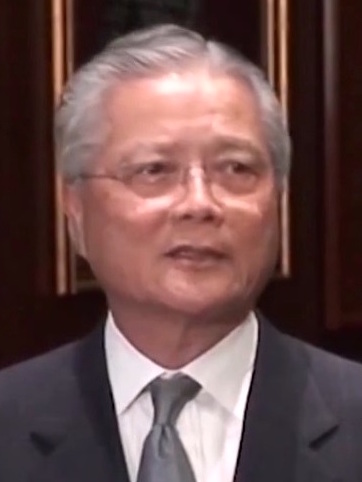
	First party	Second party	Third party
Leader	Starry Lee	Emily Lau	Lam Shuk-yee
Party	DAB	Democratic	FTU
Alliance	Pro-Beijing	Pan-democracy	Pro-Beijing
Last election	136 seats, 23.89%	47 seats, 17.42%	11 seats, 3.10%
Seats won	119	43	27
Seat change	Steady	▲1	▼2
Popular vote	309,262	196,068	88,292
Percentage	21.39%	13.56%	6.11%
Swing	▼2.50pp	▼3.86pp	▲3.01pp
	Fourth party	Fifth party	Sixth party
Leader	Regina Ip	Bruce Liu	Chan King-ming and others
Party	NPP/CF	ADPL	Neo Democrats
Alliance	Pro-Beijing	Pan-democracy	Pan-democracy
Last election	19 seats, 4.30%	15 seats, 3.85%	8 seats, 2.15%
Seats won	26	18	15
Seat change	▼1	▲2	▲8
Popular vote	75,793	55,275	42,148
Percentage	5.24%	3.82%	2.92%
Swing	▲0.94pp	▼0.03pp	▲0.77pp
	Seventh party	Eighth party	Ninth party
Leader	Alan Leong	Andrew Leung	Vincent Fang
Party	Civic	BPA	Liberal
Alliance	Pan-democracy	Pro-Beijing	Pro-Beijing
Last election	7 seats, 4.03%	New party	9 seats, 1.98%
Seats won	10	10	9
Seat change	▲3	▼4	▼1
Popular vote	52,346	27,452	25,157
Percentage	3.62%	1.90%	1.74%
Swing	▼0.41pp	N/A	▼0.24pp
- Map of the winning party by constituency

The 2015 Hong Kong District Council elections were held on 22 November 2015. Elections were held to all 18 District Councils with returning 431 members from directly elected constituencies after all appointed seats had been abolished.

A record-breaking 1.4 million voters, or 47 per cent of the registered voters, went to cast their votes. The pro-Beijing camp retained its control of all 18 councils with the Beijing-loyalist party Democratic Alliance for the Betterment and Progress of Hong Kong (DAB) maintained the largest party far ahead of other parties. The pan-democrats failed to seize control of the Kwai Tsing District Council, a traditional stronghold of the pan-democrats.

Both sides lost their heavyweight incumbent Legislative Councillors. Albert Ho of the Democratic Party and Frederick Fung of the Hong Kong Association for Democracy and People's Livelihood (ADPL) who were both elected through District Council (Second) constituency lost their seats while Civic Party's Kenneth Chan failed to take a seat in the Southern District. DAB's incumbent legislators Christopher Chung and Elizabeth Quat both lost their seats to pro-democracy newcomers in which Chung lost his long hold seat to a relatively unknown "umbrella soldier" Chui Chi-kin.

Activists in the 2014 Occupy protests, who are dubbed the "umbrella soldiers", had better-than-expected results with eight of them winning a seat by beating some incumbents. The pan-democrat Neo Democrats became the best performers in the election, winning 15 out of their 16 bids and doubled their seats from 7 to 15 seats.

== Boundary changes ==
As proposed in the Democratic Party's modified electoral reform package passed in 2010, all appointed seats were abolished in this election. After a review on the number of elected seats for each District Council having regard to the population forecast in mid-2015, the Electoral Affairs Commission proposed to increase 19 elected seats in 9 District Councils:

1. 1 new seat for in each Tsuen Wan and North District Councils;
2. 2 new seats for each Sham Shui Po, Kowloon City, Kwun Tong, Yau Tsim Mong and Sha Tin District Councils;
3. 3 new seats for the Sai Kung District Council; and
4. 4 new seats for the Yuen Long District Council.

The total number of elected seats for the 2015 elections was increased by 19 from 412 to 431. Additionally, the boundaries of the Eastern and Wan Chai Districts were adjusted by transferring the Tin Hau and Victoria Park district council constituency areas from the Eastern District to the Wan Chai District.

== Pre-election events ==
=== Umbrella movement ===
The 2014 Hong Kong protests sparked a fierce tussle between the pan-democrats and pro-Beijing camp as the democrats hailed a "civic awakening" while the pro-Beijing camp mobilised supporters to condemn the 79-day street blockade as an affront to the rule of law. The November District Council election was to be seen as the first big electoral test of the post-Occupy era. Both camps said events to come would have a bigger effect on voters, while the extent to which a political awakening among the city's youth would lead them to turn out to vote remains unclear. The pan-democrats encouraged young people who participated in the Occupy movement to register and vote in the district council poll.

=== Lead-in-water scandal ===
The lead-in-water scandal began in June 2015 when the Democratic Party legislator, Helena Wong Pik-wan announced that testing of drinking water at Kai Ching Estate in Kowloon revealed lead contamination. The Hong Kong Housing Authority subsequently confirmed that the levels of lead exceeded the standard established by the World Health Organization. Since the initial discovery at Kai Tak, lead contamination of drinking water has been found at numerous other housing estates, schools, and public buildings across Hong Kong. The lead contamination scandal caused widespread concern among the public in which the Democratic Party made a major comeback by being the first to reveal the scandal while the pro-Beijing camp was told to downplay the issue.

=== HKU pro-vice-chancellor selection controversy ===
An alleged political interference behind the University of Hong Kong governing council's rejection of Johannes Chan's recommended appointment to the post of pro-vice-chancellor in charge of staffing and resources. Chan, dean of the Faculty of Law sparked its climax in October 2015. The decision has received international condemnation, and is being viewed as part of a Beijing-backed curtailing of academic freedoms that will damage Hong Kong's academic reputation.

=== Polling irregularities ===
Following the last election in 2011, pan-democrats have complained of irregularities in voter registration records, and a number of candidates who lost in marginal seats made allegations of electoral fraud to the police. The government was criticised for failing to address the issue back in 2006 after alleged instances where multiple voters had registered under a same address surfaced. Before the last day for voters to check and update their particulars in order to vote in November, and for the public to report suspicious cases, the pan-democratic parties lodged a flood of complaints to the Registration and Electoral Office on 24 August 2015 about the records of over 550 voters with suspicious or false residential addresses on the eve of the election, and warning they could be "the tip of the iceberg".

=== Catholic bishop's anti-gay pastoral letter ===
On 5 November 2015, the Catholic bishop of Hong Kong John Tong urged his flock to consider candidates' views on gay rights when voting in the district council elections in a pastoral letter, as certain social movements "are challenging and twisting" the city's core values on marriage and family. "In the upcoming district council election and future polls, I urge all believers ... to consider candidates' and their parties' stance on family and marriage issues, as well as their position on" a law to ban discrimination on grounds of sexual orientation, Tong wrote The pan-democratic parties - who have often found common cause with the Catholic Church on matters of democracy and human rights - criticised Tong's remarks. People Power legislator Raymond Chan Chi-chuen, who is openly gay, criticised Tong's message and said it reflected a backward view of social movements and possibly deviated from the Vatican's line. A spokesman for the Labour Party said Tong's view was "obviously different" from the remarks of Pope Francis, who in 2013 said: "If [homosexuals] accept the Lord and have goodwill, who am I to judge them? They shouldn't be marginalised. The [homosexual] tendency is not the problem."

== Contesting parties and candidates ==
=== Parties ===
In the pro-Beijing camp, the flagship party Democratic Alliance for the Betterment and Progress of Hong Kong (DAB) filled a total of 171 candidates in the contest, followed by the Hong Kong Federation of Trade Unions with a total of 51 candidates of which 3 of them were also DAB members. The two relatively new pro-Beijing parties, the middle-class-oriented New People's Party (NPP) and the Business and Professionals Alliance for Hong Kong (BPA) developed their forces at district level since their creations in 2011 and 2012 respectively. The New People's Party got 4 of the 12 candidates elected in 2011 and at least eight incumbent councillors had since joined the party, while a merger with Civil Force, a local political group with strongholds in the New Territories East, brought the number up to 30. The NPP had a total of 42 contestants while the BPA had 16, slightly fewer than another pro-business party, the Liberal Party's 20 which four of the Liberal candidates failed to avoid direct competition with other pro-Beijing parties and would have to fight a fellow pro-Beijing candidate.

The largest pro-democratic party Democratic Party filled 95 candidates, a sharp decline from the 2011 election's 132. The Hong Kong Association for Democracy and People's Livelihood (ADPL) came after the Democrats with 26 candidates, followed by the Civic Party's 25, Neo Democrats's 16, Labour Party's 12, People Power's 9, Neighbourhood and Workers Service Centre's 6 and League of Social Democrats's 5. Many new pro-democracy groups formed by young people after the Occupy movement, including the Youngspiration, the Tsz Wan Shan Constructive Power, which aimed at Wong Tai Sin District Council, the North of the Rings, which worked in Sheung Shui and Fanling in North District, the Kowloon East Community which had its eyes on Kwun Tong District Council, and some other groups. More than 40 activists were running in the district council elections and some of them were with the "nativist" agenda. While most Umbrella candidates have joined a co-ordination mechanism run by pan-democratic parties to avoid clashes between allies, six of them refused to do so and are running against the Democratic Party in areas where the party has had a close fight with the pro-establishment camp in previous elections.

=== Candidates ===
A record-high 951 nominations were received for which six nominees withdrew their candidatures before the deadline. A total of 66 seats were uncontested, 10 fewer than in 2011, in which almost all of them went to the pro-Beijing camp. The Democratic Alliance for the Betterment and Progress of Hong Kong claimed 20 unclaimed seats, followed by New People's Party with seven and the Hong Kong Federation of Trade Unions (FTU) with six seats, while the Liberal Party took two. Two Legislative Council members Alice Mak Mei-kuen and Kwok Wai-keung of the FTU in Kwai Tsing's Wai Ying and Eastern District's Provident retained their seats without contest.

The Legislative Council members elected through District Council (Second) constituency in 2012, the former chairman of the Democratic Party Albert Ho and former chairman of the Hong Kong Association for Democracy and People's Livelihood (ADPL) Frederick Fung faced fierce challenges in their Tuen Mun's Lok Tsui and Sham Shui Po's Lai Kok constituencies. Ho faced 5 rivals including former president of the Law Society of Hong Kong Junius Ho Kwan-yiu, radical localist group Civic Passion's Cheng Chung-tai and three other independent candidates. Fung faced his former party member Eric Wong Chung-ki and FTU's Chan Wing-yan. Ho and Fung eventually lost their District Council seat and will have to adopt a new constituency for LegCo elections. Another District Council (Second) legislator, FTU's Chan Yuen-han and District Council (First) legislator, DAB's Ip Kwok-him are stepping down from Wong Tai Sin's Lung Sheung and Central and Western District's Kwun Lung, meaning that they will retire from their constituencies in next year's Legislative Council election.

== Results ==
Summary of the 22 November 2015 District Councils of Hong Kong election results
Political Affiliation	Popular vote	%	% ±	Standing	Elected	±
Democratic Alliance for the Betterment and Progress of Hong Kong	309,262	21.39	▼2.50	171	119	0
Hong Kong Federation of Trade Unions	88,292	6.11	▲3.01	48	27	▼2
New People's Party–Civil Force	75,793	5.24	▲0.94	42	26	▼1
Business and Professionals Alliance for Hong Kong	27,452	1.90	-	16	10	▼4
Liberal Party	25,157	1.74	▼0.24	20	9	▼1
Kowloon West New Dynamic	11,647	0.81	-	5	3	▼1
New Territories Association of Societies	2,356	0.16	▼0.03	2	2	0
Federation of Public Housing Estates	3,457	0.24	-	1	1	▲1
Federation of Hong Kong and Kowloon Labour Unions	3,168	0.22	▲0.06	2	1	0
New Century Forum	1,717	0.12	-	1	0	▼1
Pro-Beijing Independents	241,088	16.68	-	178	100	
Total for pro-Beijing camp	788,389	54.61	▼0.81	486	298	▼6
Democratic Party	196,068	13.56	▼3.86	95	43	▲1
Hong Kong Association for Democracy and People's Livelihood	55,275	3.82	▼0.03	26	18	▲2
Neo Democrats	42,148	2.92	▲0.77	16	15	▲8
Civic Party	52,346	3.62	▼0.41	25	10	▲3
Neighbourhood and Worker's Service Centre	16,105	1.11	▼0.11	6	5	0
Labour Party	23,029	1.59	-	12	3	▲2
Power for Democracy	3,938	0.27	▼0.05	1	1	0
Sha Tin Community Network	3,718	0.26	-	2	1	▲1
League of Social Democrats	6,526	0.45	▼1.40	5	0	0
Individuals	52,612	3.64	-	38	9	
Total for Democratic Coalition for DC Election	451,765	31.25	▼0.04	226	105	▲21
Youngspiration	12,520	0.87	-	9	1	▲1
Democratic Alliance	5,313	0.37	-	4	1	0
Kowloon East Community	3,922	0.27	-	3	1	▲1
The Frontier	2,974	0.21	-	1	1	0
People Power	11,503	0.80	▼1.19	9	0	0
Tuen Mun Community	5,196	0.36	-	4	0	0
Civic Passion	3,006	0.21	-	6	0	0
Tsz Wan Shan Constructive Power	3,633	0.25	-	2	0	0
North of the Rings	1,710	0.12	-	1	0	0
Land Justice League	1,482	0.10	▼0.16	1	0	0
Tsuen Wan Dynamic for the People	1,500	0.10	-	1	0	0
Independent democrats and others	77,767	5.38	-	66	17	
Total for pro-democracy camp	581,058	40.20	▲1.00	335	126	▲25
Independent and others	75,079	5.19	▼0.19	114	7	▲4
Total valid votes	1,445,526	100.0	-	935	431	▲19
Invalid votes	21,703					
Total (turnout 47.01%)	1,467,229					

=== Results by district ===
Council	Previous control	Previous party	Post-election control	Largest party	DAB	DP	FTU	NPP	ADPL	ND	Civ	BPA	Lib	Other pro-Beijing/ ex officio	Other pan-dems	Pro-Beijing	Pro-dem	Ex officio	Composition	Details
Central & Western	Pro-Beijing	DAB	Pro-Beijing	DAB	6	4							1	4	0	11	4	—N/a		Details
Wan Chai	Pro-Beijing	DAB	Pro-Beijing	DAB	4			1					1	5	2	11	2	—N/a		Details
Eastern	Pro-Beijing	DAB	Pro-Beijing	DAB	10	2	6				4		2	7	4	25	10	—N/a		Details
Southern	Pro-Beijing	Democratic	Pro-Beijing	Democratic	2	4		1					1	8	1	12	5	—N/a		Details
Yau Tsim Mong	Pro-Beijing	DAB	Pro-Beijing	DAB	9	1			1		1	1		6	0	16	3	—N/a		Details
Sham Shui Po	Pro-Beijing	ADPL	Pro-Beijing	ADPL	5	1			9		1	2	1	4	0	12	11	—N/a		Details
Kowloon City	Pro-Beijing	DAB	Pro-Beijing	DAB	8				3			1	1	10	1	20	4	—N/a		Details
Wong Tai Sin	Pro-Beijing	DAB	Pro-Beijing	DAB	8	3	2		2				1	4	4	15	9	—N/a		Details
Kwun Tong	Pro-Beijing	DAB	Pro-Beijing	DAB	10	3	2				1			16	5	28	9	—N/a		Details
Tsuen Wan	Pro-Beijing	DAB	Pro-Beijing	DAB	4	1	1	2		1	2			8	0	13	4	2		Details
Tuen Mun	Pro-Beijing	DAB	Pro-Beijing	DAB	8	4	4	4	3					6	1	21	8	1		Details
Yuen Long	Pro-Beijing	DAB	Pro-Beijing	DAB	6	2	4	3					1	22	3	30	5	6		Details
North	Pro-Beijing	DAB	Pro-Beijing	DAB	8	3	3			1				7	0	14	4	4		Details
Tai Po	Pro-Beijing	DAB	Pro-Beijing	DAB	5	1				3		2		8	2	13	6	2		Details
Sai Kung	Pro-Beijing	DAB	Pro-Beijing	DAB	8	2	1	3		5				3	3	13	10	2		Details
Sha Tin	Pro-Beijing	NPP/CF	Pro-Beijing	NPP/CF	7	7		9		5				4	7	19	19	1		Details
Kwai Tsing	Pro-Beijing	Democratic	Pro-Beijing	DAB	8	4	3	2				3		2	7	17	11	1		Details
Islands	Pro-Beijing	DAB	Pro-Beijing	DAB	3	1	1	1			1	1		10	0	8	2	8		Details
TOTAL					119	43	27	26	18	15	10	10	9	134	40	299	126	27		

=== Vote summary ===
Votes, of total, by camp
1. Pro-Beijing (54.6%)
2. Pan-democrats (40.2%)
3. Other (5.19%)
Seats, of total, by camp
1. Pro-Beijing (69.4%)
2. Pan-democrats (29.2%)
3. Other (1.40%)

Popular vote
DAB	21.39%
Democratic	13.56%
FTU	6.61%
NPP	5.24%
ADPL	3.82%
Civic	3.62%
Neo Democrats	2.92%
BPA	1.90%
Liberal	1.74%
Labour	1.59%
NWSC	1.11%
Others	36.50%

=== Seat summary ===
Seats
DAB	27.61%
Democratic	9.98%
FTU	6.26%
NPP	6.03%
ADPL	4.18%
Neo Democrats	3.48%
Civic	2.32%
BPA	2.32%
Liberal	2.09%
NWSC	1.16%
Others	34.80%

=== Outcome ===
Map of the winning camp by constituency.

Map of the winning camp, showing each constituency as a hexagon of equal size.

A historic turnout rate of 47 percent turnout rate was recorded in the election, of which ten constituencies with the highest turnout rates were all middle-class residential districts. The pro-Beijing camp remained control of all 18 District Councils with the Democratic Alliance for the Betterment and Progress of Hong Kong (DAB) the largest party far ahead of the others with 119 seats. The pan-democracy camp failed to reclaim control of the Kwai Tsing District Council which they won majority of the elected seats but was balanced by the appointed seats in the last election. Both pan-democrats and pro-Beijing camp won 19 seats in the Sha Tin District Council but pro-Beijing retained control with the ex officio seat of the Sha Tin Rural Committee Chairman.

Two pro-democracy District Council (Second) "super seat" legislative councillors Albert Ho and Frederick Fung were unseated by newcomers, while another pro-democracy figure James To kept his seat in Olympic and became the only one of the three pro-democracy super seat lawmakers to be able to seek a re-election in the same constituency in the next year's Legislative Council election . In Lai Kok, Fung won 2,432 votes, 99 short of won by his challenger, 25-year-old Chan Wing-yan supported by both the DAB and the Hong Kong Federation of Trade Unions (FTU), while Fung’s former ally Eric Wong Chung-ki, who also stood against him in the same constituency, won 215 votes. In Lok Tsui, Albert Ho won 1,617 votes, 125 fewer than former Law Society of Hong Kong president Junius Ho, while radical democrat Civic Passion's Cheng Chung-tai took 391 votes.

At least eight candidates inspired by the 2014 Occupy protests scored unexpected success, with Chui Chi-kin, almost unknown to the public before he was elected, beat DAB legislator Christopher Chung with 2,017 votes against Chung's 1,829 votes in Yue Wan. Another DAB legislator Elizabeth Quat also lost her seat in Chung On to pro-democracy Labour Party Yip Wing. Wong Chi-ken, another of the dozens of 'Umbrella soldiers' ran under the banner of Kowloon East Community, won 1,729 votes against incumbent Fung Kam-yuen in Lok Wah North, who scored 1,246 votes. Clarisse Yeung, who ran in Tai Hang constituency, won 1,398 votes, 250 more votes than Gigi Wong Ching-chi of the New People's Party (NPP). In Whampoa East, Business and Professionals Alliance for Hong Kong (BPA) legislator Priscilla Leung, who won 2,314 votes and beat 24-year-old Yau Wai-ching, another “Umbrella soldier” of Youngspiration, by fewer than 300 votes. Another Youngspiration candidate Kwong Po-yin defeated incumbent Kowloon City District Council chairman Lau Wai-wing by 39 votes in Whampoa West.

The Neo Democrats, a breakaway group of the Democratic Party, fared especially well, winning 15 of 16 district seats they contested which made their total seats jumped from 8 to 15. The Civic Party won 10 seats in total, although legislator Kenneth Chan failed in his bid to run in South Horizons East and to secure an entry ticket to a super seat next year. The Democratic Party won one more seat and scored 43 in total. Several second-tier figures, including vice-chairman Lo Kin-hei and chief executive Lam Cheuk-ting, scored victories in Lei Tung II and Shek Wu Hui respectively, while others like vice-chairman Andrew Wan lost in Shek Yam.

The FTU, which its district councillors had dropped their dual membership of DAB and FTU to rally behind Chan Yuen-han in the District Council (Second) "super seat" in the 2012 Legislative Council election, won 27 seats in total under the FTU banner solely and secured a qualification to nominate a candidate for the "super seat" in next year's election. The New People's Party, although having formed an alliance with the Civil Force, suffered unexpected defeats in Sha Tin as many veteran Civil Force district councillors were defeated by pro-democratic new faces. In Hong Kong Island, chairwoman Regina Ip's Legislative Council constituency, the NPP also lost a few seats such as Tai Hang and Tai Koo Shing East.

A total of eight victors were employees of state-owned enterprises. The local subsidiary of China Travel Service announced on its website after the election that six of their employees had won seats. The CTS staff association praised “the ‘love the country love Hong Kong’ and society-serving spirit of the CTS staff ...[and their]... substantial contributions to the group’s involvement in Hong Kong’s social affairs”. There were two others in addition to the six from CTS, and some had stood for election previously. None had disclosed their relationships with the state-owned firms in their official election platforms.

== Aftermath ==
=== Cheng Wing-kin case ===
Cheng Wing-kin, an online radio host, was revealed and He offered localist groups more than HK$850,000 for each of them to take on pan-democrat contenders in specified constituencies, including the offers of between HK$150,000 and HK$200,000 to five individuals, including Youngspiration's Baggio Leung Chung-hang, upon the instructions of a Putonghua-speaking “Boss Li”, whom was allegedly from Beijing’s United Front Work Department. Leung declined and publicised the offer, in eventually led to Cheng being convicted for engaging in corrupt conduct at the election.
