= Yeung Uk Road (constituency) =

Constituency in Tsuen Wan District, Hong Kong

- Elected constituency for the Tsuen Wan District Council
- Boundary of Yeung Uk Road in Tsuen Wan District
- District: Tsuen Wan
- Legislative Council constituency: New Territories South West
- Population: 17,799 (2019)
- Electorate: 8,095 (2019)

Current constituency
- Created: 1994
- Number of members: One
- Member: Vacant

Yeung Uk Road is one of the 17 constituencies in the Tsuen Wan District of Hong Kong.

The constituency returns one district councillor to the Tsuen Wan District Council, with an election every four years.

Yeung Uk Road constituency is loosely based on the eastern part of the Yeung Uk Road including Bo Shek Mansion, Tsuen Wan Garden, Indi Home and Chelsea Court with estimated population of 17,799.

== Councillors represented ==
Election	Member	Party
1994	Chan Yuk-man	DAB
2003	Chan Han-pan	DAB
2019	Steven Lam Sek-tim→Vacant	TWCN

== Election results ==
=== 2010s ===
Tsuen Wan District Council Election, 2019: Yeung Uk Road
Party	Candidate	Votes	%	±%
TWCN	Steven Lam Sek-tim	2,788	50.60	+13.30
DAB	Ng Chun-yu	2,614	47.44	−15.26
Nonpartisan	Wong Man-chau	108	1.96	
Majority		174	3.16	
Turnout		5,530	68.35	
TWCN gain from DAB		Swing		

Tsuen Wan District Council Election, 2015: Yeung Uk Road
Party	Candidate	Votes	%	±%
DAB	Chan Han-pan	2,075	62.7	–13.5
TWCN	Steven Lam Sek-tim	1,233	37.3	
Majority		842	25.4	
Turnout		3,390	43.0	
DAB hold		Swing		

Tsuen Wan District Council Election, 2011: Yeung Uk Road
Party	Candidate	Votes	%	±%
DAB	Chan Han-pan	2,246	76.2	−14.5
Civic	Yip Sui-lun	703	23.8	
DAB hold		Swing		

=== 2000s ===
Tsuen Wan District Council Election, 2007: Yeung Uk Road
Party	Candidate	Votes	%	±%
DAB	Chan Han-pan	1,897	90.7	+25.0
Independent	Chum Wai-lam	194	9.3	
DAB hold		Swing		

Tsuen Wan District Council Election, 2003: Yeung Uk Road
Party	Candidate	Votes	%	±%
DAB	Chan Han-pan	1,620	65.7	+9.5
Independent	Wong Fah-man	847	34.3	−1.7
DAB hold		Swing		

=== 1990s ===
Tsuen Wan District Council Election, 1999: Yeung Uk Road
Party	Candidate	Votes	%	±%
DAB	Chan Yuk-man	954	56.2	+4.0
Independent	Wong Fah-man	611	36.0	−10.2
Independent	Ho Tak-kwong	125	7.4	
DAB hold		Swing		

Tsuen Wan District Board Election, 1994: Yeung Uk Road
Party	Candidate	Votes	%	±%
DAB	Chan Yuk-man	800	52.2	
Independent	Wong Fah-man	709	46.2	
DAB win (new seat)				
