= 2019 Tsuen Wan District Council election =

Hong Kong local election

- 24 November 2019

19 (of the 21) seats to Tsuen Wan District Council 11 seats needed for a majority
- Turnout: 73.5% ▲12.6%
	First party	Second party	Third party
Party	Civic	Democratic	Deliberation TW
Last election	2 seats, 11.2%	1 seat, 6.5%	New party
Seats before	2	1	0
Seats won	3	3	2
Seat change	▲1	▲2	▲2
Popular vote	15,068	13,813	9,516
Percentage	12.1%	11.1%	7.7%
Swing	▲0.9%	▲4.6%	N/A
	Fourth party	Fifth party	Sixth party
Party	Neo Democrats	Team Chu	FPHE
Last election	1 seat, 5.4%	New party	Did not contest
Seats before	1	0	1
Seats won	2	1	1
Seat change	▲1	▲1	Steady
Popular vote	7,215	5,113	4,792
Percentage	5.8%	4.1%	3,9%
Swing	▲0.4%	N/A	N/A
	Seventh party	Eighth party	Ninth party
Party	Labour	FTU	TWCN
Last election	Did not contest	1 seat, 2.1%	0 seat, 1.8%
Seats before	0	1	0
Seats won	1	1	1
Seat change	▲1	Steady	▲1
Popular vote	4,444	2,871	2,788
Percentage	3.6%	2.3%	2.2%
Swing	N/A	▲0.2%	▲0.4%
- Colours on map indicate winning party for each constituency.

The 2019 Tsuen Wan District Council election was held on 24 November 2019 to elect all 19 elected members to the 21-member Tsuen Wan District Council.

The pro-democrats seized the control of the council in the historic landslide victory in the 2019 election amid the massive pro-democracy protests by taking 16 of the 19 elected seats in the council.

== Overall election results ==
Before election:

↓
4	1	15
Pro-dem		Pro-Beijing

Change in composition:

↓
16	1	4
Pro-democracy		Pro-Beijing

Tsuen Wan District Council election result 2019
Party	Seats	Gains	Losses	Net gain/loss	Seats %	Votes %	Votes	+/−
Independent	3	2	5	−3	15.8	24.3	30,159	
DAB	0	0	4	−4	0.0	14.0	17,421	−4.3
Civic	3	1	0	+1	15.8	12.1	15,068	+0.9
Democratic	3	2	0	+2	15.8	11.1	13,813	+4.6
Deliberation TW	2	0	0	+2	10.5	7.7	9,516	
Roundtable	0	0	2	−2	0.0	6.1	7,615	
Neo Democrats	2	1	0	+1	10.5	5.8	7,215	+0.4
Team Chu	1	1	0	+1	5.3	4.1	5,113	
FPHE	1	0	0	0	5.3	3.9	4,792	
Labour	1	1	0	+1	5.3	3.6	4,444	
PfD	1	1	0	+1	5.3	2.8	3,511	
FTU	1	0	0	0	5.3	2.3	2,871	+0.2
TWCN	1	1	0	+1	5.3	2.2	2,788	
