= Tung Chung South (constituency) =

- Elected constituency for the Islands District Council
- Boundary of Tung Chung South in Islands District
- District: Islands
- Legislative Council constituency: Hong Kong Island West
- Population: 21,213 (2019)
- Electorate: 12,771 (2019)

Current constituency
- Created: 2007
- Number of members: One
- Member: vacant
- Created from: Tung Chung

Tung Chung South
- Traditional Chinese: 東涌南
- Simplified Chinese: 东涌南
Transcriptions
Standard Mandarin
- Hanyu Pinyin: Dōng Chōng Nán
Yue: Cantonese
- Yale Romanization: Dūng chūng nàahm
- Jyutping: Dung1 cung1 naam4

Tung Chung South is one of the 10 constituencies in the Islands District in Hong Kong. The constituency returns one district councillor to the Islands District Council, with an election every four years.

Tung Chung South constituency is loosely based on Tung Chung with an estimated population of 21,213.

== Councillors represented ==
Election	Member	Party
2007	Chau Chuen-heung	DAB
2015	Holden Chow Ho-ding	DAB
2019	Sheep Wong Chun-yeung→vacant	Independent

== Election results ==
=== 2010s ===
Islands District Council Election, 2019: Tung Chung South
Party	Candidate	Votes	%	±%
Independent	Sheep Wong Chun-yeung	5,049	56.49	+9.49
DAB	Holden Chow Ho-ding	3,619	40.49	−12.51
Nonpartisan	Lau Wing-yin	183	2.05	
Nonpartisan	Lai Wing-on	87	0.97	
Majority		1,430	16.00	
Turnout		8,967	70.25	
Independent gain from DAB		Swing		

Islands District Council Election, 2015: Tung Chung South
Party	Candidate	Votes	%	±%
DAB	Holden Chow Ho-ding	2,161	53.0	–16.3
Nonpartisan	Wong Chun-yeung	1,917	47.0	
Majority		244	6.0	–46.4
DAB hold		Swing		

Islands District Council Election, 2011: Tung Chung South
Party	Candidate	Votes	%	±%
DAB	Chau Chuen-heung	2,326	69.3	+12.8
Civic	Cheng Lai-yee	1,029	30.7	–12.8
Majority		1,297	38.6	+39.4
DAB hold		Swing	+12.8	

=== 2000s ===
Islands District Council Election, 2007: Tung Chung South
Party	Candidate	Votes	%	±%
DAB	Chau Chuen-heung	1,985	56.5	
Civic	Peter On Kim-ying	1,527	43.5	
Majority		458	13.0	
DAB win (new seat)				
