= 2015 Sham Shui Po District Council election =

Hong Kong local election

- 22 November 2015

All 23 seats to Sham Shui Po District Council 12 seats needed for a majority
- Turnout: 50.2%
	First party	Second party	Third party
Party	ADPL	DAB	KWND/BPA
Last election	7 seats, 35.6%	4 seats, 19.3%	Did not stand
Seats before	7	4	4
Seats won	9	5	4
Seat change	▲2	▲1	Steady
Popular vote	26,318	15,564	17,650
Percentage	30.1%	17.8%	20.2%
Swing	▼5.5%	▼1.5%	N/A
	Fourth party	Fifth party	Sixth party
Party	Civic	Democratic	Liberal
Last election	0 seat, 5.5%	0 seat, 1.4%	0 seat, 1.0%
Seats before	0	0	0
Seats won	1	1	1
Seat change	▲1	▲1	▲1
Popular vote	5,812	2,353	2,277
Percentage	6.6%	2.7%	2.6%
Swing	▲1.1%	▲1.3%	▲1.6%
	Seventh party
Party	FLU
Last election	1 seat, 2.0%
Seats before	1
Seats won	1
Seat change	Steady
Popular vote	1,544
Percentage	1.8%
Swing	▼0.2%
- Colours on map indicate winning party for each constituency.

The 2015 Sham Shui Po District Council election was held on 22 November 2015 to elect all 23 members to the Sham Shui Po District Council.

Veteran legislator Frederick Fung Kin-kee of the Hong Kong Association for Democracy and People's Livelihood (ADPL) lost his seat in Lai Kok to Chan Wing-yan of the Democratic Alliance for the Betterment and Progress of Hong Kong (DAB) and the Hong Kong Federation of Trade Unions (FTU).

== Overall election results ==
Before election:

↓
7	14
Pro-democracy	Pro-Beijing

Change in composition:

↓
11	12
Pro-democracy	Pro-Beijing

Sham Shui Po District Council election result 2015
Party	Seats	Gains	Losses	Net gain/loss	Seats %	Votes %	Votes	+/−
ADPL	9	3	3	+2	39.1	30.1	26,318	−5.5
KWND	4	0	0	0	17.4	20.2	17,650	
DAB	5	1	0	+1	21.7	17.8	15,564	−1.5
Independent	1	0	0	0	4.3	10.8	9,493	
Civic	1	1	0	+1	4.3	6.6	5,812	+1.1
Democratic	1	1	0	+1	4.3	2.7	2,353	+1.3
Liberal	1	1	0	+1	4.3	2.6	2,277	
FTU	0	0	0	0	0	1.9	1,678	
FLU	1	0	0	0	4.3	1.8	1,544	–0.2
Civic Passion	0	0	0	0	0	1.3	1,160	
Socialist Action	0	0	0	0	0	1.3	1,152	
LSD	0	0	0	0	0	1.1	982	+0.4
CYSRC	0	0	0	0	0	0.9	786	+0.1
