= 2019 Islands District Council election =

Hong Kong local election

- 24 November 2019

10 (of the 18) seats to Islands District Council 10 seats needed for a majority
- Turnout: 67.5% ▲22.2%
	First party	Second party
Party	Civic	DAB
Last election	1 seats, 11.3%	3 seats, 21.5%
Seats before	1	3
Seats won	2	1
Seat change	▲1	▼2
Popular vote	4,780	15,095
Percentage	8.4%	26.7%
Swing	▼2.9%	▲5.2%
	Third party	Fourth party
Party	Democratic	NPP
Last election	1 seat, 9.1%	1 seat, 4.2%
Seats before	0	1
Seats won	1	0
Seat change	▲1	▼1
Popular vote	1,332	2,359
Percentage	2.4%	4.2%
Swing	▼6.7%	▼2.9%
- Colours on map indicate winning party for each constituency.

The 2019 Islands District Council election was held on 24 November 2019 to elect all 10 elected members to the 18-member Islands District Council.

In the historic landslide victory, Islands District Council became the only council where pro-democrats gained the majority of the elected seats but failed to take control of the council due to the 8 ex-officio seats. However, the pro-democrats 7 of the 10 elected seats and ousted DAB legislator Holden Chow from his seat.

== Overall election results ==
Before election:

↓
2	16
PD	Pro-Beijing

Change in composition:

↓
7	11
Pro-democracy	Pro-Beijing

Islands District Council election result 2019
Party	Seats	Gains	Losses	Net gain/loss	Seats %	Votes %	Votes	+/−
Independent	5	2	1	+1	50.0	40.8	23,076	
DAB	1	0	3	−3	10.0	26.7	15,095	
PfD	1	1	0	+1	10.0	15.9	8,981	
Civic	2	1	0	+1	20.0	8.4	4,780	−2.9
NPP	0	0	1	−1	0.0	4.2	2,359	−2.9
Democratic	1	1	0	+1	10.0	2.4	1,332	−6.7
Roundtable	0	0	0	0	0.0	1.7	990	
