= 2011 Wong Tai Sin District Council election =

Hong Kong local election

- 6 November 2011

25 (of the 29) seats to Wong Tai Sin District Council 15 seats needed for a majority
- Turnout: 44.3%
	First party	Second party	Third party
Party	DAB	Democratic	ADPL
Last election	8 seats, 26.4%	3 seats, 11.2%	2 seats, 7.5%
Seats before	9	4	2
Seats won	9	3	2
Seat change	Steady	▼1	Steady
Popular vote	20,181	15,089	9,528
Percentage	24.7%	18.5%	5.7%
Swing	▼1.7%	▲7.3%	▼1.8%
	Fourth party	Fifth party
Party	FTU	Liberal
Last election	Did not run	1 seat, 3.2%
Seats before	0	1
Seats won	1	1
Seat change	▲1	Steady
Popular vote	6,160	3,790
Percentage	1.5%	4.0%
Swing	N/A	▲0.8%
- Colours on map indicate winning party for each constituency.

The 2011 Wong Tai Sin District Council election was held on 6 November 2011 to elect all 25 elected members to the 29-member District Council.

== Overall election results ==
Before election:

↓
10	15
Pro-democracy	Pro-Beijing

Change in composition:

↓
9	16
Pro-democracy	Pro-Beijing

Wong Tai Sin District Council election result 2011
Party	Seats	Gains	Losses	Net gain/loss	Seats %	Votes %	Votes	+/−
DAB	9	1	1	0	36.0	24.7	20,181	−1.7
Independent	8	2	1	+1	32.0	24.0	19,575	
Democratic	3	0	1	−1	12.0	18.5	15,089	+7.3
FTU	1	1	0	+1	4.0	7.5	6,160	
ADPL	2	0	0	0	8.0	5.7	4,626	−1.8
Liberal	1	0	0	0	4.0	4.6	3,790	+0.8
Democratic Coalition	1	0	0	0	4.0	4.6	3,762	−3.1
Civic	0	0	0	0	0	3.8	3,102	−3.1
LSD	0	0	1	−1	0	3.0	2,471	-7.7
NPP	0	0	0	0	0	1.6	1,275	
CHESSA	0	0	0	0	0	1.5	1,232	
People Power	0	0	0	0	0	0.5	441	
