= 2007 Islands District Council election =

Hong Kong local election

- 18 November 2007

10 (of the 22) seats to Islands District Council 12 seats needed for a majority
- Turnout: 44.7%
| | First party | Second party | Third party |
|---|---|---|---|
| Party | DAB | Civic | FTU |
| Last election | 4 seats, 29.3% | New party | Did not contest |
| Seats before | 4 | 1 | 0 |
| Seats won | 4 | 2 | 1 |
| Seat change | Steady | ▲1 | ▲1 |
| Popular vote | 6,595 | 3,821 | 1,510 |
| Percentage | 29.1% | 16.8% | 6.7% |
| Swing | ▼0.2% | N/A | N/A |
- Colours on map indicate winning party for each constituency.

The 2007 Islands District Council election was held on 18 November 2007 to elect all 10 elected members to the 22-member District Council.

== Overall election results ==
Before election:

↓
| 1 | 7 |
| PD | Pro-Beijing |

Change in composition:

↓
| 2 | 8 |
| Pro-dem | Pro-Beijing |

Islands District Council election result 2007
| Party | Seats | Gains | Losses | Net gain/loss | Seats % | Votes % | Votes | +/− |
|---|---|---|---|---|---|---|---|---|
| Independent | 3 | 0 | 0 | 0 | 30.0 | 38.9 | 8,827 | |
| DAB | 4 | 0 | 0 | 0 | 40.0 | 29.1 | 6,595 | −0.2 |
| FTU | 1 | 0 | 0 | 0 | 10.0 | 16.8 | 3,821 | |
| Civic | 1 | 1 | 0 | +1 | 20.0 | 12.3 | 3,069 | −4.5 |
| FTU | 1 | 1 | 0 | +1 | 10.0 | 6.7 | 1,510 | |
| Democratic | 0 | 0 | 0 | 0 | 0 | 5.8 | 1,317 | |
| LSD | 0 | 0 | 0 | 0 | 0 | 0.8 | 183 | |
