= 2019 Wong Tai Sin District Council election =

Hong Kong local election

- 24 November 2019

All 25 seats to Wong Tai Sin District Council 13 seats needed for a majority
- Turnout: 70.4% ▲23.3%
	First party	Second party	Third party
Party	Democratic	ADPL	Civic
Last election	3 seats, 15.1%	2 seats, 5.7%	0 seat, 2.1%
Seats before	3	2	0
Seats won	6	3	2
Seat change	▲3	▲1	▲2
Popular vote	24,342	11,668	9,126
Percentage	13.2%	6.3%	4.9%
Swing	▼1.9%	▲0.6%	N/A
	Fourth party	Fifth party	Sixth party
Party	TWSCP	People Power	CHESSA
Last election	0 seat, 3.5%	0 seat, 1.2%	Did not contest
Seats before	0	0	0
Seats won	2	1	1
Seat change	▲2	▲1	▲1
Popular vote	10,160	3,822	3,523
Percentage	5.5%	2.1%	1.9%
Swing	▲2.0%	▲0.9%	N/A
	Seventh party	Eighth party	Ninth party
Party	DAB	FTU	Liberal
Last election	8 seats, 24.1%	2 seats, 8.8%	1 seat, 2.7%
Seats before	7	2	1
Seats won	0	0	0
Seat change	▼7	▼2	▼1
Popular vote	31,869	18,939	3,075
Percentage	17.2%	10.2%	1.7%
Swing	▼6.9%	▲1.4%	▼1.0%
- Colours on map indicate winning party for each constituency.

The 2019 Wong Tai Sin District Council election was held on 24 November 2019 to elect all 25 members to the District Council.

The pro-democrats scored a historic landslide victory in the election amid the massive pro-democracy protests by taking all the seats in the council. The pro-Beijing councillors were completely wiped out as a result, with Democratic Party becoming the largest party.

== Overall election results ==
Before election:

↓
9	16
Pro-democracy	Pro-Beijing

Change in composition:

↓
25
Pro-democracy

Wong Tai Sin District Council election result 2019
Party	Seats	Gains	Losses	Net gain/loss	Seats %	Votes %	Votes	+/−
Independent	8	5	7	−2	32.0	32.8	60,723	
DAB	0	0	7	−7	0.0	17.2	31,869	−6.9
Democratic	6	3	0	+3	24.0	13.2	24,342	–1.9
FTU	0	0	2	−2	0.0	10.2	18,939	+1.4
ADPL	3	1	0	+1	12.0	6.3	11,668	+0.6
TWSCP	2	2	0	+2	8.0	5.5	10,160	+2.0
Civic	2	2	0	+2	8.0	4.9	9,126	+2.8
PfD	2	2	0	+2	8.0	4.1	7,620	
People Power	1	1	0	+1	4.0	2.1	3,822	+0.9
CHESSA	1	1	0	+1	4.0	1.9	3,523	
Liberal	0	0	1	−1	0.0	1.7	3,075	–1.0
