= 2003 Tsuen Wan District Council election =

Hong Kong local election

- 23 November 2003

17 (of the 24) seats to Tsuen Wan District Council 13 seats needed for a majority
- Turnout: 44.4%
	First party	Second party
Party	Democratic	DAB
Last election	6 seats, 25.8%	1 seats, 12.7%
Seats before	5	1
Seats won	5	1
Seat change	Steady	Steady
Popular vote	9,346	6,424
Percentage	21.1%	14.5%
Swing	▼4.7%	▲1.8%
	Third party	Fourth party
Party	HKPA	Liberal
Last election	1 seat, 1.1%	3 seats, 12.2%
Seats before	1	1
Seats won	1	1
Seat change	Steady	Steady
Popular vote	2,954	2,646
Percentage	6.7%	6.0%
Swing	▲5.6%	▼6.2%
- Colours on map indicate winning party for each constituency.

The 2003 Tsuen Wan District Council election was held on 23 November 2003 to elect all 17 elected members to the 24-member District Council.

== Overall election results ==
Before election:

↓
10	7
Pro-democracy	Pro-Beijing

Change in composition:

↓
11	6
Pro-democracy	Pro-Beijing

Tsuen Wan District Council election result 2003
Party	Seats	Gains	Losses	Net gain/loss	Seats %	Votes %	Votes	+/−
Independent	9	1	1	0	52.9	51.7	22,880	
Democratic	5	0	0	0	29.4	21.1	9,346	−4.7
DAB	1	0	0	0	5.9	12.8	5,641	+1.8
HKPA	1	0	0	0	5.9	6.7	2,954	−5.6
Liberal	1	0	0	0	5.9	6.0	2,646	−6.2
