= 2003 Wong Tai Sin District Council election =

Hong Kong local election

- 23 November 2003

25 (of the 31) seats to Wong Tai Sin District Council 16 seats needed for a majority
- Turnout: 45.7%
| | First party | Second party | Third party |
|---|---|---|---|
| Party | DAB | Democratic | Frontier |
| Last election | 5 seats, 22.5% | 7 seats, 26.4% | Did not run |
| Seats before | 6 | 5 | 3 |
| Seats won | 5 | 4 | 2 |
| Seat change | ▼1 | ▼1 | ▼1 |
| Popular vote | 20,808 | 13,223 | 10,585 |
| Percentage | 25.9% | 16.5% | 13.2% |
| Swing | ▲3.4% | ▼9.9% | N/A |
| | Fourth party | Fifth party |
| Party | ADPL | Liberal |
| Last election | 2 seats, 8.6% | Did not run |
| Seats before | 2 | 0 |
| Seats won | 2 | 1 |
| Seat change | Steady | ▲1 |
| Popular vote | N/A | N/A |
| Percentage | N/A | N/A |
| Swing | N/A | N/A |
- Colours on map indicate winning party for each constituency.

The 2003 Wong Tai Sin District Council election was held on 23 November 2003 to elect all 25 elected members to the 29-member District Council.

== Overall election results ==
Before election:

↓
| 12 | 13 |
| Pro-democracy | Pro-Beijing |

Change in composition:

↓
| 13 | 12 |
| Pro-democracy | Pro-Beijing |

Wong Tai Sin District Council election result 2003
| Party | Seats | Gains | Losses | Net gain/loss | Seats % | Votes % | Votes | +/− |
|---|---|---|---|---|---|---|---|---|
| Independent | 11 | 3 | 1 | +2 | 44.0 | 42.8 | 34,398 | |
| DAB | 5 | 1 | 2 | −1 | 20.0 | 25.9 | 20,808 | +3.4 |
| Democratic | 4 | 1 | 2 | −1 | 12.0 | 16.5 | 13,223 | −9.9 |
| Frontier | 2 | 0 | 1 | −1 | 8.0 | 13.2 | 10,585 | |
| NWSC | 0 | 0 | 0 | 0 | 0 | 1.7 | 1,385 | |
| ADPL | 2 | 0 | 0 | 0 | 8.0 | 0 | 0 | |
| Liberal | 1 | 1 | 0 | +1 | 4.0 | 0 | 0 | |
