= 2011 Islands District Council election =

Hong Kong local election

- 6 November 2011

10 (of the 21) seats to Islands District Council 11 seats needed for a majority
- Turnout: 44.8%
	First party	Second party
Party	DAB	Civic
Last election	4 seats, 29.1%	2 seats, 16.8%
Seats before	4	2
Seats won	4	1
Seat change	Steady	▼1
Popular vote	5,376	3,069
Percentage	21.5%	12.3%
Swing	▼7.6%	▼4.5%
	Third party	Fourth party
Party	FTU	Economic Synergy
Last election	1 seat, 6.7%	New party
Seats before	1	0
Seats won	1	1
Seat change	Steady	▲1
Popular vote	2,691	1,320
Percentage	6.9%	5.3%
Swing	▲0.2%	N/A
- Colours on map indicate winning party for each constituency.

The 2011 Islands District Council election was held on 6 November 2011 to elect all 10 elected members to the 21-member District Council.

== Overall election results ==
Before election:

↓
2	8
PD	Pro-Beijing

Change in composition:

↓
1	9
PD	Pro-Beijing

Islands District Council election result 2011
Party	Seats	Gains	Losses	Net gain/loss	Seats %	Votes %	Votes	+/−
Independent	3	1	1	0	30.0	36.8	9,194	
DAB	4	0	0	0	40.0	21.5	5,376	−7.6
Civic	1	0	1	−1	10.0	12.3	3,069	−4.5
FTU	1	0	0	0	10.0	10.8	2,691	+0.2
Democratic	0	0	0	0	0	8.9	2,209	+3.1
Economic Synergy	1	1	0	+1	0	5.3	1,320	
NPP	0	0	0	0	0	2.8	708	
LSD	0	0	0	0	0	1.6	391	+0.8
