= 2003 Islands District Council election =

Hong Kong local election

- 23 November 2003

8 (of the 20) seats to Islands District Council 11 seats needed for a majority
- Turnout: 50.4%
	First party
Party	DAB
Last election	2 seats, 15.4%
Seats before	2
Seats won	4
Seat change	▲2
Popular vote	4,420
Percentage	29.3%
Swing	▲13.9%
- Colours on map indicate winning party for each constituency.

The 2003 Islands District Council election was held on 23 November 2003 to elect all 8 elected members to the 20-member District Council.

== Overall election results ==
Before election:

↓
1	6
Pro-dem	Pro-Beijing

Change in composition:

↓
1	7
Pro-dem	Pro-Beijing

Islands District Council election result 2003
Party	Seats	Gains	Losses	Net gain/loss	Seats %	Votes %	Votes	+/−
Independent	4	0	0	0	50.0	56.4	8,515	
DAB	4	2	0	+2	50.0	29.3	4,420	+13.9
Democratic	0	0	0	0	0	8.9	1,337	−4.9
Liberal	0	0	0	0	0	3.1	473	+1.5
