= 2007 Wong Tai Sin District Council election =

Hong Kong local election

- 18 November 2007

25 (of the 31) seats to Wong Tai Sin District Council 16 seats needed for a majority
- Turnout: 42.2%
	First party	Second party	Third party
Party	DAB	Democratic	LSD
Last election	5 seats, 25.9%	4 seats, 16.5%	New party
Seats before	6	3	2
Seats won	8	3	2
Seat change	▲2	Steady	Steady
Popular vote	19,971	8,464	8,091
Percentage	26.4%	11.2%	10.7%
Swing	▲1.5%	▼5.3%	N/A
	Fourth party	Fifth party	Sixth party
Party	ADPL	Liberal	Frontier
Last election	2 seats	1 seat, 4.0%	2 seats, 13.2%
Seats before	2	1	1
Seats won	2	1	1
Seat change	Steady	Steady	Steady
Popular vote	5,698	2,449	2,370
Percentage	7.5%	3.2%	3.1%
Swing	N/A	▼0.8%	▼10.1%
- Colours on map indicate winning party for each constituency.

The 2007 Wong Tai Sin District Council election was held on 18 November 2007 to elect all 25 elected members to the 29-member District Council.

== Overall election results ==
Before election:

↓
13	12
Pro-democracy	Pro-Beijing

Change in composition:

↓
11	14
Pro-democracy	Pro-Beijing

Wong Tai Sin District Council election result 2007
Party	Seats	Gains	Losses	Net gain/loss	Seats %	Votes %	Votes	+/−
DAB	8	2	0	+2	32.0	26.4	19,971	+1.5
Independent	8	0	2	−2	32.0	30.9	23,456	
Democratic	3	0	0	0	12.0	11.2	8,464	−5.3
LSD	2	0	0	0	8.0	10.7	8,091	
ADPL	2	0	0	0	8.0	7.5	5,698	
Civic	0	0	0	0	0	6.9	5,199	
Liberal	1	0	0	0	4.0	3.2	2,449	−0.8
Frontier	1	0	0	0	4.0	3.1	2,370	−10.1
Civic	0	0	0	0	0	0.1	93	
