= 2011 Tsuen Wan District Council election =

Hong Kong local election

- 6 November 2011

17 (of the 22) seats to Tsuen Wan District Council 12 seats needed for a majority
- Turnout: 44.6%
	First party	Second party	Third party
Party	DAB	Civic	Democratic
Last election	3 seats, 17.2%	2 seats, 11.9%	3 seats, 10.0%
Seats before	3	2	2
Seats won	4	2	1
Seat change	▲1	Steady	Steady
Popular vote	11,507	6,529	6,748
Percentage	22.7%	12.9%	13.3%
Swing	▲5.5%	▲1.0%	▲3.3%
	Fourth party	Fifth party	Sixth party
Party	FTU	NPP	NTAS
Last election	0 seat, 3.3%	New party	Did not run
Seats before	1	0	1
Seats won	1	1	1
Seat change	Steady	▲1	Steady
Popular vote	4,059	3,310	Uncontested
Percentage	8.0%	6.5%	N/A
Swing	▲4.7%	N/A	N/A
- Colours on map indicate winning party for each constituency.

The 2011 Tsuen Wan District Council election was held on 6 November 2011 to elect all 17 elected members to the 22-member District Council.

== Overall election results ==
Before election:

↓
5	12
Pro-dem	Pro-Beijing

Change in composition:

↓
4	13
Pro-dem	Pro-Beijing

Tsuen Wan District Council election result 2011
Party	Seats	Gains	Losses	Net gain/loss	Seats %	Votes %	Votes	+/−
Independent	7	2	2	0	41.2	27.9	14,179	
DAB	4	2	1	+1	23.5	22.7	11,507	+5.5
Democratic	1	1	2	–1	5.9	13.3	6,748	+3.3
Civic	2	0	0	0	11.8	12.9	6,529	+1.0
FTU	1	0	0	0	5.9	8.0	4,059	+4.7
People Power	0	0	1	−1	0	7.1	3,610	
NPP	1	1	0	+1	5.9	6.5	3,310	
NTAS	1	0	0	0	5.9	0	0	
