= 1999 Tsuen Wan District Council election =

Hong Kong local election

- 28 November 1999

17 (of the 24) seats to Tsuen Wan District Council 13 seats needed for a majority
- Turnout: 33.6%
	First party	Second party
Party	Democratic	Liberal
Last election	2 seats, 24.9%	Did not contest
Seats before	3	4
Seats won	6	3
Seat change	▲3	▼1
Popular vote	8,416	3,981
Percentage	28.1%	12.2%
Swing	▼3.2%	N/A
	Third party	Fourth party
Party	DAB	HKPA
Last election	1 seat, 5.1%	Did not contest
Seats before	2	1
Seats won	1	1
Seat change	▼1	Steady
Popular vote	4,145	344
Percentage	12.7%	1.1%
Swing	▲7.6%	N/A
- Colours on map indicate winning party for each constituency.

The 2003 Tsuen Wan District Council election was held on 23 November 2003 to elect all 17 elected members to the 24-member District Council.

== Overall election results ==
Before election:

↓
6	9
Pro-democracy	Pro-Beijing

Change in composition:

↓
10	7
Pro-democracy	Pro-Beijing

Tsuen Wan District Council election result 1999
Party	Seats	Gains	Losses	Net gain/loss	Seats %	Votes %	Votes	+/−
Independent	6	2	1	+1	35.3	48.2	15,729	
Democratic	6	3	0	+3	35.3	28.1	8,416	−3.2
DAB	1	0	1	−1	5.9	12.7	4,145	+7.6
Liberal	3	0	1	−1	5.9	12.2	3,981	
HKPA	1	0	0	0	5.9	1.1	344	
