= 1999 Wong Tai Sin District Council election =

Hong Kong local election

- 28 November 1999

25 (of the 31) seats to Wong Tai Sin District Council 16 seats needed for a majority
- Turnout: 38.5%
| | First party | Second party |
|---|---|---|
| Party | Democratic | DAB |
| Last election | 4 seats, 28.2% | 4 seats, 21.4% |
| Seats before | 5 | 4 |
| Seats won | 7 | 5 |
| Seat change | ▲2 | ▲1 |
| Popular vote | 16,823 | 14,363 |
| Percentage | 26.4% | 22.5% |
| Swing | ▼1.8% | ▲1.1% |
| | Third party | Fourth party |
| Party | ADPL | FTU |
| Last election | 3 seats, 12.5% | Did not contest |
| Seats before | 2 | 0 |
| Seats won | 2 | 1 |
| Seat change | Steady | ▲1 |
| Popular vote | 5,501 | 1,074 |
| Percentage | 8.6% | 1.7% |
| Swing | ▼3.9% | N/A |
- Colours on map indicate winning party for each constituency.

The 1999 Wong Tai Sin District Council election was held on 28 November 1999 to elect all 25 elected members to the 29-member District Council.

== Overall election results ==
Before election:

↓
| 8 | 14 |
| Pro-democracy | Pro-Beijing |

Change in composition:

↓
| 12 | 13 |
| Pro-democracy | Pro-Beijing |

Wong Tai Sin District Council election result 1999
| Party | Seats | Gains | Losses | Net gain/loss | Seats % | Votes % | Votes | +/− |
|---|---|---|---|---|---|---|---|---|
| Independent | 10 | 3 | 4 | −1 | 40.0 | 40.8 | 26,022 | |
| DAB | 5 | 2 | 1 | +1 | 20.0 | 22.5 | 14,363 | +1.1 |
| Democratic | 7 | 3 | 1 | +2 | 28.0 | 26.4 | 16,823 | −1.8 |
| ADPL | 2 | 0 | 0 | 0 | 8.0 | 8.6 | 5,501 | −3.9 |
| FTU | 1 | 1 | 0 | +1 | 4.0 | 1.7 | 1,074 | |
