= Tsuen Wan Community Network =

Tsuen Wan Community Network 荃灣社區網絡
- Chief Executive: Lam Sek-tim
- Founded: 2015; 11 years ago
- Ideology: Hong Kong localism Liberalism (HK)
- Regional affiliation: Pro-democracy camp
- Colours: Navy blue and purple
- Legislative Council: 0 / 90
- Tsuen Wan District Council: 0 / 22

Tsuen Wan Community Network (Chinese: 荃灣社區網絡) is a local political group based in Tsuen Wan founded in 2015. In a historic pro-democracy landslide in 2019 District Council election, the group won one seat in the Tsuen Wan District Council.

== History ==
The group was formed in 2015 as a Tsuen Wan-based community group. Its leader Lam Sek-tim ran in the 2015 District Council election against Democratic Alliance for the Betterment and Progress of Hong Kong (DAB) legislator Chan Han-pan in Yeung Uk Road but lost. It was part of the Community Network Union, a localist political alliance of six community groups led by pro-independence Ventus Lau. The Tsuen Wan Community Network later quit the Union in 2018.

Lam Sek-tim ran in Yeung Uk Road in the 2019 District Council election again and defeated Chan Han-pan's successor Ng Chun-yu with narrow margin of 174 votes in the pro-democracy historic landslide victory.

== Electoral performance ==
=== Tsuen Wan District Council elections ===
| Election | Number of popular votes | % of popular votes | Total elected seats | +/− |
|---|---|---|---|---|
| 2015 | 1,233 | 1.80 | 0 / 18 | 0 |
| 2019 | 2,788▲ | 2.24▲ | 1 / 19 | 1▲ |
