= 2007 Tsuen Wan District Council election =

Hong Kong local election

- 18 November 2007

17 (of the 24) seats to Tsuen Wan District Council 13 seats needed for a majority
- Turnout: 38.2%
| | First party | Second party | Third party |
|---|---|---|---|
| Party | DAB | Democratic | Civic |
| Last election | 1 seats, 12.8% | 5 seats, 21.1% | New party |
| Seats before | 2 | 4 | 2 |
| Seats won | 3 | 3 | 2 |
| Seat change | ▲1 | ▼1 | Steady |
| Popular vote | 7,463 | 4,366 | 5,166 |
| Percentage | 17.2% | 10.0% | 11.9% |
| Swing | ▲4.4% | ▼11.1% | N/A |
| | Fourth party | Fifth party |
| Party | LSD | Liberal |
| Last election | New party | 1 seat, 6.0% |
| Seats before | 1 | 1 |
| Seats won | 1 | 1 |
| Seat change | Steady | Steady |
| Popular vote | 4,962 | 2,462 |
| Percentage | 11.4% | 5.7% |
| Swing | N/A | ▼0.3% |
- Colours on map indicate winning party for each constituency.

The 2007 Tsuen Wan District Council election was held on 18 November 2007 to elect all 17 elected members to the 24-member District Council.

== Overall election results ==
Before election:

↓
| 11 | 6 |
| Pro-democracy | Pro-Beijing |

Change in composition:

↓
| 8 | 9 |
| Pro-democracy | Pro-Beijing |

Tsuen Wan District Council election result 2007
| Party | Seats | Gains | Losses | Net gain/loss | Seats % | Votes % | Votes | +/− |
|---|---|---|---|---|---|---|---|---|
| Independent | 7 | 2 | 2 | 0 | 41.2 | 40.5 | 17,596 | |
| DAB | 3 | 1 | 0 | +1 | 17.6 | 17.2 | 7,463 | +4.4 |
| Democratic | 3 | 0 | 1 | –1 | 17.6 | 10.0 | 4,366 | −11.1 |
| Civic | 2 | 0 | 0 | 0 | 11.8 | 11.9 | 5,166 | |
| LSD | 1 | 0 | 0 | 0 | 5.9 | 11.4 | 4,962 | |
| Liberal | 1 | 0 | 0 | 0 | 5.9 | 5.7 | 2,462 | −0.3 |
| FTU | 0 | 0 | 0 | 0 | 0 | 3.3 | 1,444 | |
