= 2015 Tsuen Wan District Council election =

Hong Kong local election

- 22 November 2015

18 (of the 20) seats to Tsuen Wan District Council 11 seats needed for a majority
- Turnout: 50.9%
	First party	Second party	Third party
Party	DAB	Civic	NPP
Last election	4 seats, 22.7%	2 seats, 12.9%	1 seat, 6.5%
Seats before	4	2	1
Seats won	4	2	2
Seat change	Steady	Steady	▲1
Popular vote	12,206	7,505	6,529
Percentage	18.3%	11.2%	9.8%
Swing	▼4.4%	▼1.7%	▲3.3%
	Fourth party	Fifth party	Sixth party
Party	Democratic	Neo Democrats	NTAS
Last election	1 seat, 13.3%	Did not run	1 seat
Seats before	1	0	1
Seats won	1	1	1
Seat change	Steady	▲1	Steady
Popular vote	4,365	3,601	2,356
Percentage	6.5%	5.4%	3.5%
Swing	▼6.8%	N/A	N/A
	Seventh party
Party	FTU
Last election	1 seat, 8.0%
Seats before	1
Seats won	1
Seat change	Steady
Popular vote	1,385
Percentage	2.1%
Swing	▼5.9%
- Colours on map indicate winning party for each constituency.

The 2015 Tsuen Wan District Council election was held on 22 November 2015 to elect all 18 elected members to the 20-member Tsuen Wan District Council.

== Overall election results ==
Before election:

↓
4	13
Pro-dem	Pro-Beijing

Change in composition:

↓
4	1	13
Pro-dem	I.	Pro-Beijing

Tsuen Wan District Council election result 2015
Party	Seats	Gains	Losses	Net gain/loss	Seats %	Votes %	Votes	+/−
Independent	6	1	0	+1	33.3	32.1	21,404	
DAB	4	0	0	0	22.2	18.3	12,206	–4.4
Civic	2	0	0	0	11.1	11.2	7,505	–1.7
NPP	2	1	0	+1	11.1	9.8	6,529	+3.3
Democratic	1	0	0	0	5.6	6.5	4,365	–6.8
Neo Democrats	1	1	0	+1	5.6	5.4	3,601	
NTAS	1	0	0	0	5.6	3.5	2,356	
TWDP	0	0	0	0	0	2.2	1,500	
FTU	1	0	0	0	5.6	2.1	1,385	–5.9
TWCN	0	0	0	0	0	1.8	1,233	
Democratic Alliance	0	0	0	0	0	1.3	864	
Third Side	0	0	0	0	0	0.3	193	
