= Islands District Council =

District council for the Islands District in Hong Kong

Coordinates: 22.286724°N 114.155121°E

Islands District Council 離島區議會

Type
- Type: Hong Kong District Council of the Islands District

History
- Founded: 1 April 1981; 44 years ago (District Board); 1 July 1997; 28 years ago (Provisional); 1 January 2000; 25 years ago (District Council)

Leadership
- Chair: Amy Yeung Wai-sum, Independent
- Vice-Chair: Vacant

Structure
- Seats: 18 councillors consisting of 2 elected members 4 district committee members 4 appointed members 8 ex officio members
- DAB: 3 / 18
- FTU: 1 / 18
- Independent: 14 / 18

Elections
- Voting system: First past the post
- Last election: 10 December 2023

Meeting place
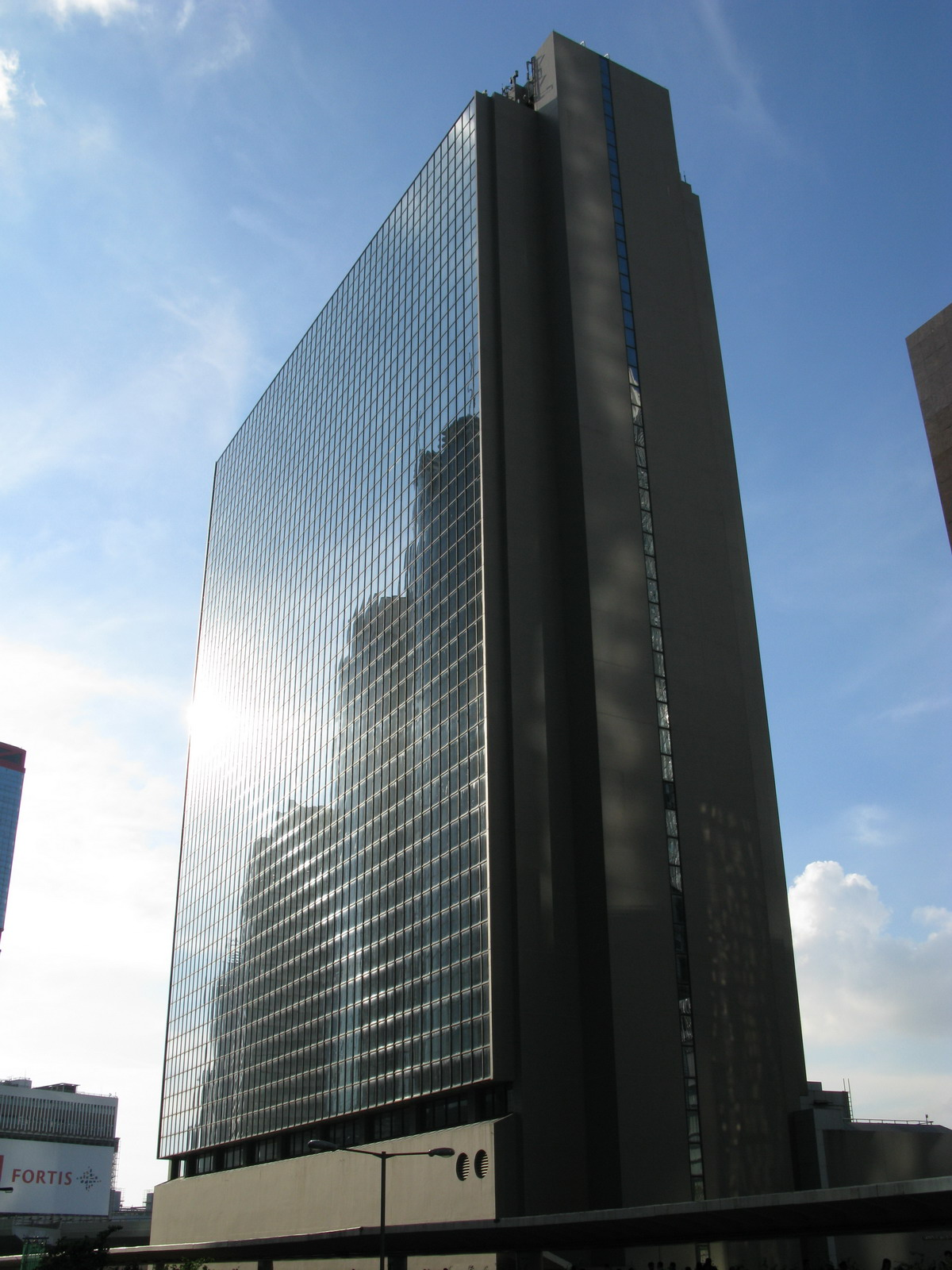
- 20/F., Harbour Building, 38 Pier Road, Central, Hong Kong

Website
- www.districtcouncils.gov.hk/island/

Islands District Council
- Traditional Chinese: 離島區議會
Transcriptions
Yue: Cantonese
- Yale Romanization: Lèih dóu kēui yíh wuih
- Jyutping: Lei^{4} dou^{2} keoi^{1} ji^{5} wui^{6}

The Islands District Council (noted as Island) is the district council for the Islands District in Hong Kong. It is one of 18 such councils. The Islands District currently consists of 18 members, of which the district is divided into 10 constituencies, electing a total of 10 with 8 ex-officio members who is the Peng Chau, Lamma North, Tung Chung, Lamma South, Tai O, Lantau South, Mui Wo and Cheung Chau rural committee chairmen. The latest election was held on 24 November 2019.

== History ==
Emblem of Islands District Board (1982–1997)

The Islands District Council was established on 1 April 1981 under the name of the Islands District Board as the result of the colonial Governor Murray MacLehose's District Administration Scheme reform. The District Board was partly elected with the ex-officio Regional Council members and chairmen of eight Rural Committees, Peng Chau, Lamma North, Tung Chung, Lamma South, Tai O, Lantau South, Mui Wo and Cheung Chau, as well as members appointed by the Governor until 1994 when last Governor Chris Patten refrained from appointing any member.

The Islands District Board became the Islands Provisional District Board after the Hong Kong Special Administrative Region (HKSAR) was established in 1997 with the appointment system being reintroduced by Chief Executive Tung Chee-hwa. The current Islands District Council was established on 1 January 2000 after the first District Council election in 1999. The appointed seats were abolished in 2015 after the modified constitutional reform proposal was passed by the Legislative Council in 2010.

The Islands District Council has the most number of eight ex-officio seats and is dominated by the rural forces. As the Tung Chung new town was developed in the early 2000s, some political parties have also successfully made attempts in those areas, notably Tang Ka-piu of the Hong Kong Federation of Trade Unions (FTU) in Yat Tung Estate North and Holden Chow of the Democratic Alliance for the Betterment and Progress of Hong Kong (DAB) in Tung Chung South. Amy Yung Wing-sheung of the pro-democracy Civic Party has also held Discovery Bay since 2000.

In the historic landslide victory in 2019 election, Islands District Council became the only council where pro-democrats gained the majority of the elected seats but failed to take control of the council due to the 8 ex-officio seats. However, the pro-democrats got 7 of the 10 elected seats and ousted DAB legislator Holden Chow for District Council (Second) from his seat.

== Political control ==
Since 1982 political control of the council has been held by the following parties:

| Camp in control | Largest party | Years | Composition |
|---|---|---|---|
| No Overall Control | None | 1982 - 1985 | |
| Pro-government | None | 1985 - 1988 | |
| Pro-government | None | 1988 - 1991 | |
| Pro-government | None | 1991 - 1994 | |
| Pro-Beijing | DAB | 1994 - 1997 | |
| Pro-Beijing | DAB | 1997 - 1999 | |
| Pro-Beijing | DAB | 2000 - 2003 | |
| Pro-Beijing | DAB | 2004 - 2007 | |
| Pro-Beijing | DAB | 2008 - 2011 | |
| Pro-Beijing | DAB | 2012 - 2015 | |
| Pro-Beijing | DAB | 2016 - 2019 | |
| Pro-Beijing | Civic → DAB | 2020 - 2023 | |
| Pro-Beijing | Independent | 2024 - 2027 | |

== Political makeup ==

Elections are held every four years.

| Political party | Council members | | | | | | | Current members |
| Political party | 1994 | 1999 | 2003 | 2007 | 2011 | 2015 | 2019 | Current members |
|---|---|---|---|---|---|---|---|---|
| Independent | 4 | 5 | 4 | 3 | 3 | 2 | 6 | 15 / 18 |
| Civic | - | - | - | 2 | 1 | 1 | 2 | 1 / 18 |
| DAB | 2 | 2 | 4 | 4 | 4 | 3 | 1 | 1 / 18 |
| Democratic | 0 | 0 | 0 | 0 | 0 | 1 | 1 | 1 / 18 |

== District result maps ==
1994

1999

2003

2007

2011

2015

2019

== Members represented ==
| Capacity | Code | Constituency | Name | Political affiliation | Term | | Notes |
|---|---|---|---|---|---|---|---|
| Elected | T01 | Islands | Yip Pui-kei | DAB | 1 January 2024 | Incumbent | |
| Elected | T01 | Islands | Lau Chin-pang | FTU | 1 January 2024 | Incumbent | |
| District Committees | | | Mealoha Kwok Wai-man | DAB | 1 January 2024 | Incumbent | |
| District Committees | | | Lau Shun-ting | DAB | 1 January 2024 | Incumbent | |
| District Committees | | | Luo Chenghuan | Independent | 1 January 2024 | Incumbent | |
| District Committees | | | Jonathan Chow Yuen-kuk | Independent | 1 January 2024 | Incumbent | |
| Appointed | | | Randy Yu Hon-kwan | Independent | 1 January 2024 | Incumbent | |
| Appointed | | | Ng Choi-wah | Independent | 1 January 2024 | Incumbent | |
| Appointed | | | Lau Shun-ting | Independent | 1 January 2024 | Incumbent | |
| Appointed | | | Lau Shuk-han | Independent | 1 January 2024 | Incumbent | |
| Ex Officio | | Peng Chau Rural Committee Chairman | Wong Hon-kuen | Independent | 1 January 2024 | Incumbent | |
| Ex Officio | | Lamma North Rural Committee Chairman | Chan Lin-wai | Independent | 1 January 2024 | Incumbent | |
| Ex Officio | | Tung Chung Rural Committee Chairman | Wong Chau-ping | Independent | 1 January 2024 | Incumbent | |
| Ex Officio | | Lamma South Rural Committee Chairman | Chow Yuk-tong | Independent | 1 January 2024 | Incumbent | |
| Ex Officio | | Tai O Rural Committee Chairman | Ho Siu-kei | Independent | 1 January 2024 | Incumbent | |
| Ex Officio | | Lantau South Rural Committee Chairman | Ho Chun-fai | Independent | 1 January 2024 | Incumbent | |
| Ex Officio | | Mui Wo Rural Committee Chairman | Wong Man-hon | Independent | 1 January 2024 | Incumbent | |
| Ex Officio | | Cheung Chau Rural Committee Chairman | Yung Chi-ming | Independent | 1 January 2024 | Incumbent | |

== Leadership ==
=== Chairs ===
Since 1985, the chairman is elected by all the members of the board:

| Chairman | Years | Political Affiliation |
|---|---|---|
| Fok Siu-tung | 1981 | District Officer |
| Ricky Fung | 1981–1983 | District Officer |
| William Yap | 1983–1985 | District Officer |
| Daniel Lam Wai-keung | 1985–2011 | Heung Yee Kuk |
| Chow Yuk-tong | 2012–2019 | Heung Yee Kuk |
| Randy Yu Hon-kwan | 2020–2023 | Heung Yee Kuk |
| Amy Yeung Wai-sum | 2024–present | District Officer |

=== Vice Chairs ===
| Vice Chairman | Years | Political Affiliation |
|---|---|---|
| Chau Chuen-heung | 2000–2015 | DAB |
| Randy Yu Hon-kwan | 2016–2019 | Heung Yee Kuk |
| Wong Man-hon | 2020–2023 | Heung Yee Kuk |
