= 2015 Wong Tai Sin District Council election =

Hong Kong local election

- 22 November 2015

All 25 seats to Wong Tai Sin District Council 13 seats needed for a majority
- Turnout: 47.1%
| | First party | Second party | Third party |
|---|---|---|---|
| Party | DAB | Democratic | FTU |
| Last election | 9 seats, 24.7% | 4 seats, 18.5% | 1 seat, 1.5% |
| Seats before | 8 | 3 | 2 |
| Seats won | 8 | 3 | 2 |
| Seat change | Steady | Steady | Steady |
| Popular vote | 25,075 | 15,666 | 9,180 |
| Percentage | 24.1% | 15.1% | 8.8% |
| Swing | ▼0.6% | ▼3.4% | ▲7.3% |
| | Fourth party | Fifth party | Sixth party |
| Party | ADPL | Frontier | Liberal |
| Last election | 2 seats, 5.7% | Did not stand | 1 seat, 4.0% |
| Seats before | 2 | 1 | 1 |
| Seats won | 2 | 1 | 1 |
| Seat change | Steady | Steady | Steady |
| Popular vote | 5,950 | 2,974 | 2,772 |
| Percentage | 5.7% | 2.9% | 2.7% |
| Swing | % | N/A | ▼1.3% |
- Colours on map indicate winning party for each constituency.

The 2015 Wong Tai Sin District Council election was held on 22 November 2015 to elect all 25 members to the District Council.

== Overall election results ==
Before election:

↓
| 9 | 16 |
| Pro-democracy | Pro-Beijing |

Change in composition:

↓
| 9 | 1 | 15 |
| Pro-democracy | I. | Pro-Beijing |

Wong Tai Sin District Council election result 2015
| Party | Seats | Gains | Losses | Net gain/loss | Seats % | Votes % | Votes | +/− |
|---|---|---|---|---|---|---|---|---|
| DAB | 8 | 1 | 1 | 0 | 32.0 | 24.1 | 25,075 | −0.6 |
| Independent | 8 | 3 | 3 | 0 | 32.0 | 33.6 | 34,860 | |
| Democratic | 3 | 1 | 1 | 0 | 12.0 | 15.1 | 15,666 | –3.4 |
| FTU | 2 | 0 | 0 | 0 | 8.0 | 8.8 | 9,180 | +7.3 |
| ADPL | 2 | 0 | 0 | 0 | 8.0 | 5.7 | 5,950 | ±0.0 |
| TWSCP | 0 | 0 | 0 | 0 | 0 | 3.5 | 3,633 | |
| Frontier | 1 | 0 | 0 | 0 | 4.0 | 2.9 | 2,974 | |
| Liberal | 1 | 0 | 0 | 0 | 4.0 | 2.7 | 2,772 | –1.9 |
| Civic | 0 | 0 | 0 | 0 | 0 | 2.1 | 2,207 | –1.7 |
| People Power | 0 | 0 | 0 | 0 | 0 | 1.2 | 1,207 | +0.7 |
| Civic Passion | 0 | 0 | 0 | 0 | 0 | 0.3 | 262 | |
