= 2015 Islands District Council election =

Hong Kong local election

- 22 November 2015

10 (of the 18) seats to Islands District Council 10 seats needed for a majority
- Turnout: 45.3%
	First party	Second party	Third party
Party	DAB	Civic	FTU
Last election	4 seats, 21.5%	1 seats, 12.3%	1 seat, 6.9%
Seats before	4	2	1
Seats won	3	1	1
Seat change	▼1	▼1	Steady
Popular vote	5,843	3,073	3,061
Percentage	21.5%	11.3%	11.3%
Swing	Steady	▼1.0%	▲4.4%
	Fourth party	Fifth party	Sixth party
Party	Democratic	NPP	BPA
Last election	1 seat, 8.9%	0 seat, 2.8%	1 seat, 5.3%
Seats before	1	0	1
Seats won	1	1	1
Seat change	Steady	▲1	Steady
Popular vote	2,469	1,929	1,487
Percentage	9.1%	7.1%	5.5%
Swing	▲0.2%	▲4.3%	▲0.2%
- Colours on map indicate winning party for each constituency.

The 2015 Islands District Council election was held on 22 November 2015 to elect all 10 elected members to the 18-member Islands District Council.

== Overall election results ==
Before election:

↓
2	8
PD	Pro-Beijing

Change in composition:

↓
2	8
Pro-dem	Pro-Beijing

Islands District Council election result 2015
Party	Seats	Gains	Losses	Net gain/loss	Seats %	Votes %	Votes	+/−
Independent	2	1	1	0	20.0	34.3	9,329	
DAB	3	0	1	–1	30.0	21.5	5,843	±0.0
Civic	1	0	1	−1	10.0	11.3	3,073	−1.0
FTU	1	0	0	0	10.0	11.3	3,061	–0.5
Democratic	1	1	0	+1	10.0	9.1	2,469	+0.2
NPP	1	1	0	+1	10.0	7.1	1,929	+4.3
BPA	1	0	0	0	10.0	5.5	1,487	+0.2
