= Lai Kok (constituency) =

Hong Kong constituency

- Elected constituency for the Sham Shui Po District Council
- Boundary of Lai Kok in Sham Shui Po District
- District: Sham Shui Po
- Legislative Council constituency: Kowloon West
- Population: 13,067 (2019)
- Electorate: 9,522 (2019)

Current constituency
- Created: 1994
- Number of members: One
- Member: Vacant
- Created from: Cheung Sha Wan; Nam Cheong Central; Nam Cheong West

Lai Kok is one of the 25 constituencies of the Sham Shui Po District Council. The seat elects one member of the council every four years. The boundary is loosely based on the area of Lai Kok Estate.

== Councillors represented ==
Election	Member	Party
1994	Eric Wong Chung-ki	ADPL
1999	Eric Wong Chung-ki	Democratic
2003 by-election	Tracy Lai Wai-lan	ADPL
2003	Frederick Fung Kin-kee	ADPL
2015	Chan Wing-yan	DAB/FTU
2019	Li Kwing→Vacant	ADPL

== Election results ==
=== 2010s ===
Sham Shui Po District Council Election, 2019: Lai Kok
Party	Candidate	Votes	%	±%
ADPL	Li Kwing	3,592	54.07	+7.07
FTU (DAB)	Chan Wing-yan	3,051	45.93	−2.97
Majority		541	8.14	
Turnout		6,672	70.09	
ADPL gain from FTU		Swing		

Sham Shui Po District Council Election, 2015: Lai Kok
Party	Candidate	Votes	%	±%
DAB (FTU)	Chan Wing-yan	2,531	48.9	+7.4
ADPL	Frederick Fung Kin-kee	2,432	47.0	–5.1
Nonpartisan	Eric Wong Chung-ki	215	4.2	
Majority		99	1.9	–8.7
Turnout		5,224	58.1	
DAB gain from ADPL		Swing	+6.3	

Sham Shui Po District Council Election, 2011: Lai Kok
Party	Candidate	Votes	%	±%
ADPL	Frederick Fung Kin-kee	2,528	52.05	+1.02
FTU (DAB)	Fan Kwok-fai	2,015	41.49	−7.48
People Power	Chiu Chik-tung	239	4.92	
Nonpartisan	Chung Wing-yuen	75	1.54	
Majority		513	10.56	+8.50
ADPL hold		Swing	+8.50	

=== 2000s ===
Sham Shui Po District Council Election, 2007: Lai Kok
Party	Candidate	Votes	%	±%
ADPL	Frederick Fung Kin-kee	2,115	51.03	−19.94
DAB (FTU)	Fan Kwok-fai	2,030	48.97	+19.94
Majority		85	2.06	−39.88
ADPL hold		Swing	−39.88	

Sham Shui Po District Council Election, 2003: Lai Kok
Party	Candidate	Votes	%	±%
ADPL	Frederick Fung Kin-kee	3,268	70.97	
FTU (DAB)	Fan Kwok-fai	1,337	29.03	
Majority		1,937	41.94	
ADPL hold		Swing		

Sham Shui Po District Council by-Election, 2003: Lai Kok
Party	Candidate	Votes	%	±%
ADPL	Tracy Lai Wai-lan	3,064	65.6	
FTU (DAB)	Fan Kwok-fai	1,606	34.4	
Majority		1,458	31.2	
ADPL gain from Democratic		Swing		

=== 1990s ===
Sham Shui Po District Council Election, 1999: Lai Kok
Party	Candidate	Votes	%	±%
Democratic	Eric Wong Chung-ki	1,782	40.15	−16.06
ADPL	Lee Wai-ho	1,557	35.08	
Nonpartisan	Chan Keng-chau	1,099	24.76	
Majority		225	5.07	
Democratic hold		Swing		

Sham Shui Po District Council Election, 1994: Lai Kok
Party	Candidate	Votes	%	±%
ADPL	Eric Wong Chung-ki	1,490	56.21	
Nonpartisan	Ho Kam-tong	1,161	43.79	
Majority		329	12.42	(new)
