= Wong Tai Sin District Council =

Hong Kong district council

Coordinates: 22.3344°N 114.1880°E

Wong Tai Sin District Council 黃大仙區議會

Type
- Type: Hong Kong District Council of the Wong Tai Sin District

History
- Founded: 6 May 1981 (District Board); 1 July 1997 (Provisional); 1 January 2000 (District Council)

Leadership
- Chair: Thomas Wu Kui-wah, Independent

Structure
- Seats: 20 councillors consisting of 4 elected members 8 district committee members 8 appointed members
- DAB: 5 / 20
- FTU: 3 / 20
- FLU: 1 / 20
- Independent: 11 / 20

Elections
- Voting system: First past the post
- Last election: 10 December 2023

Meeting place
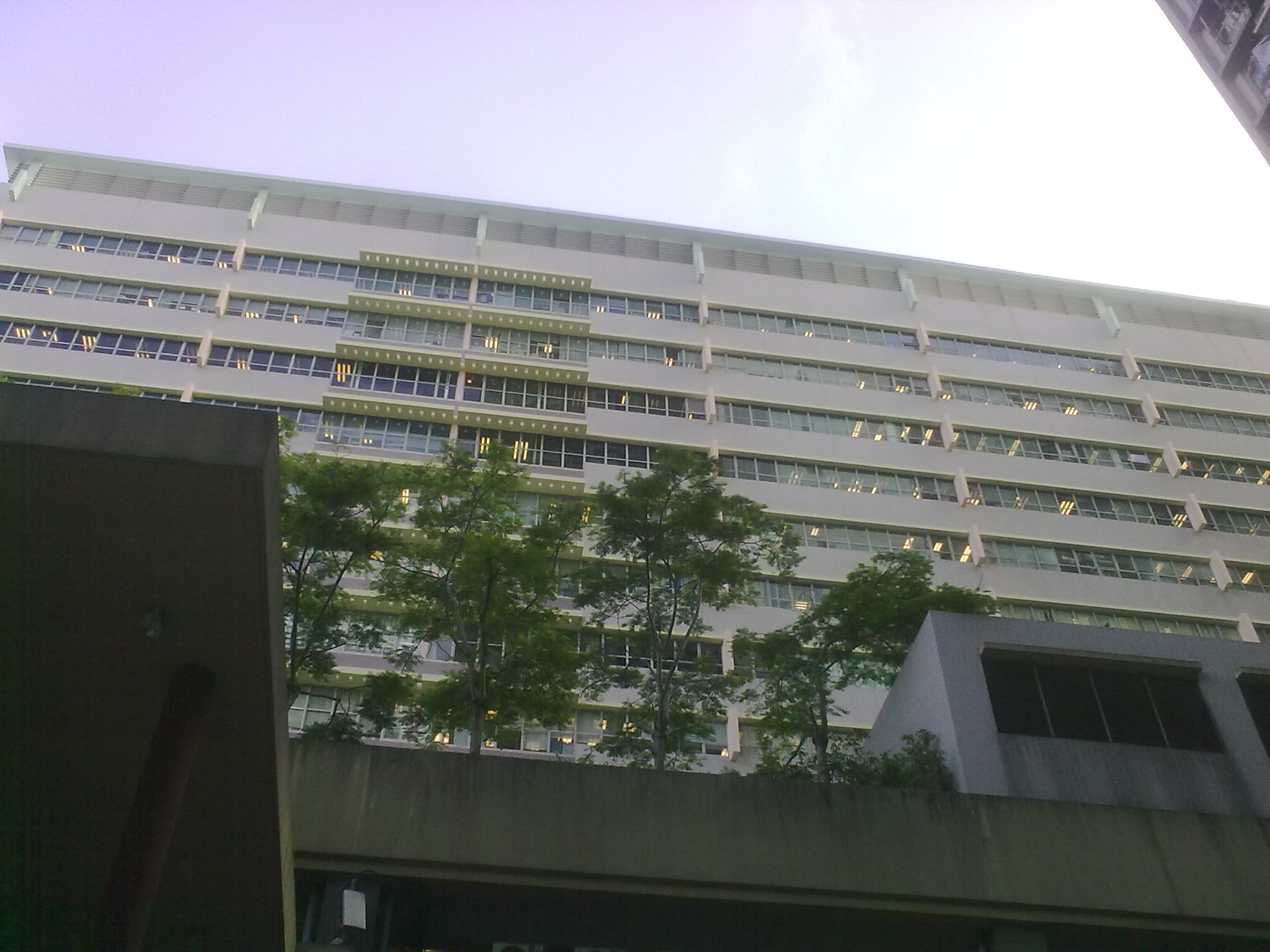
- 6/F Lung Cheung Office Block, 138 Lung Cheung Road, Wong Tai Sin, Kowloon

Website
- www.districtcouncils.gov.hk/wts/

The Wong Tai Sin District Council (Chinese: 黃大仙區議會; noted as WTS) is one of 18 such district councils in Hong Kong, representing the Wong Tai Sin District. The Wong Tai Sin District Council currently consists of 20 members, two members were each elected from one of 2 constituencies, 8 district committee members, and 8 appointed members. The latest election was held on 10 December 2023.

== History ==
The Wong Tai Sin District Council was established on 6 May 1981 under the name of the Wong Tai Sin District Board as the result of the colonial Governor Murray MacLehose's District Administration Scheme reform. The District Board was partly elected with the ex-officio Urban Council members, as well as members appointed by the Governor until 1994 when last Governor Chris Patten refrained from appointing any member.

The Wong Tai Sin District Board became Wong Tai Sin Provisional District Board after the Hong Kong Special Administrative Region (HKSAR) was established in 1997 with the appointment system being reintroduced by Chief Executive Tung Chee-hwa. The Wong Tai Sin District Council was established on 1 January 2000 after the first District Council election in 1999. The council has become fully elected when the appointed seats were abolished in 2011 after the modified constitutional reform proposal was passed by the Legislative Council in 2010.

Due to the district's industrial character, the Wong Tai Sin District Council has been a stronghold for the pro-Beijing traditional leftists, returning one of its first directly elected Legislative Councillors Chan Yuen-han, who was member of the Hong Kong Federation of Trade Unions (FTU) and represented the Democratic Alliance for the Betterment of Hong Kong (DAB). The pro-democrats also had their influence in the district, seeing Conrad Lam of the United Democrats of Hong Kong elected to the Legislative Council in 1985 and 1991.

The district also bred high-profile politicians such as Andrew To, the youngest member elected to the District Board 1991, member of the United Democrats and the Democratic Party, secretary-general of The Frontier and chairman of the League of Social Democrats (LSD) who held his seat until his defeat in the 2011 election with the LSD being wiped out in the district. Democratic Party chairman Wu Chi-wai was also a long-time Wong Tai Sin District Councillor, representing King Fu from 1999 to 2019.

The pro-democrats scored a historic landslide victory in the 2019 election amid the massive pro-democracy protests by taking all the seats in the council. The pro-Beijing councillors were completely wiped out as a result, with Democratic Party becoming the largest party.

== Political control ==
Since 1982 political control of the council has been held by the following parties:

Camp in control	Largest party	Years	Composition
No Overall Control	Civic Association	1982–1985	
Pro-government	Civic Association	1985–1988	
Pro-government	Civic Association	1988–1991	
Pro-government	LDF	1991–1994	
Pro-Beijing	Democratic	1994–1997	
Pro-Beijing	Democratic	1997–1999	
Pro-Beijing	Democratic → DAB	2000–2003	
Pro-Beijing	DAB	2004–2007	
Pro-Beijing	DAB	2008–2011	
Pro-Beijing	DAB	2012–2015	
Pro-Beijing	DAB	2016–2019	
Pro-democracy	Democratic → ADPL	2020–2023	
Pro-Beijing	Independent	2024–2027	

== Political makeup ==
Elections are held every four years.

Political party	Council members							Current members
Political party	1994	1999	2003	2007	2011	2015	2019	Current members
Independent	2	10	12	8	9	8	10	11 / 25
Democratic	5	7	4	3	3	3	6	6 / 25
ADPL	3	2	2	2	2	2	3	3 / 25
TWSCP	-	-	-	-	-	0	2	2 / 25
People Power	-	-	-	-	-	0	1	1 / 25
CHESSA	-	-	-	-	-	-	1	1 / 25

== District result maps ==
1994

1999

2003

2007

2011

2015

2019

== Members represented ==
Capacity	Code	Constituency	Name	Political affiliation	Term		Notes
Elected	H01	Wong Tai Sin East	Mabel Tam Mei-po	FTU	1 January 2024	Incumbent	
Elected	H01	Wong Tai Sin East	Kyle Yuet Ngai-keung	DAB	1 January 2024	Incumbent	
Elected	H02	Wong Tai Sin West	Poon Cheuk-bun	DAB	1 January 2024	Incumbent	
Elected	H02	Wong Tai Sin West	Leo Yeung Nok-hin	Independent	1 January 2024	Incumbent	
District Committees			Yuen Kwok-keung	DAB	1 January 2024	Incumbent	
District Committees			Joe Lai Wing-ho	DAB	1 January 2024	Incumbent	
District Committees			Mok Kin-wing	FTU	1 January 2024	Incumbent	
District Committees			Leonard Chan Ying	Independent	1 January 2024	Incumbent	
District Committees			Fung Kin-lok	Independent	1 January 2024	Incumbent	
District Committees			Lui Kai-lin	Independent	1 January 2024	Incumbent	
District Committees			Lee Tung-kwong	Independent	1 January 2024	Incumbent	
District Committees			Andie Chan Wai-kwan	Independent	1 January 2024	Incumbent	
Appointed			Leung Tang-fung	DAB	1 January 2024	Incumbent	
Appointed			Anthony Yau Yiu-shing	FTU	1 January 2024	Incumbent	
Appointed			Janus Lau Yuen-yee	FLU	1 January 2024	Incumbent	
Appointed			Dennis Li	Independent	1 January 2024	Incumbent	
Appointed			Deannie Yew Yat-wa	Independent	1 January 2024	Incumbent	
Appointed			Edmond Hung Chor-ying	Independent	1 January 2024	Incumbent	
Appointed			Tang Man-wai	Independent	1 January 2024	Incumbent	
Appointed			Godfrey Ngai Shi-shing	Independent	1 January 2024	Incumbent	

== Leadership ==
=== Chairs ===
Since 1985, the chairman is elected by all the members of the board:

Chairman	Years	Political Affiliation
I. R. Strachan	1981–1983	District Officer
Chuk Kin-fan	1983–1985	District Officer
Michael Cheng Tak-kin	1985–1988	Independent
Michael Lee Yuk-kwan	1988–1991	Independent
Chan Kam-man	1991–1999	LDF
Lam Man-fai	2000–2003	DAB
Wong Kam-chi	2004–2007	Independent
Li Tak-hong	2008–2019	DAB
Hui Kam-shing	2020–2021	ADPL
Thomas Wu Kui-fah	2024–present	District Officer

=== Vice Chairs ===
Vice Chairman	Years	Political Affiliation
Wong Kam-chi	2000–2003	Independent
Kan Chi-ho	2004–2007	DAB
Wong Kam-chi	2008–2011	Independent
Wong Kam-chiu	2012–2015	Independent
Joe Lai Wing-ho	2016–2019	DAB
Wong Yat-yuk	2020–2021	Independent
