= Joephy Chan =

Hong Kong councillor

The Honourable Joephy Chan
- 陳穎欣
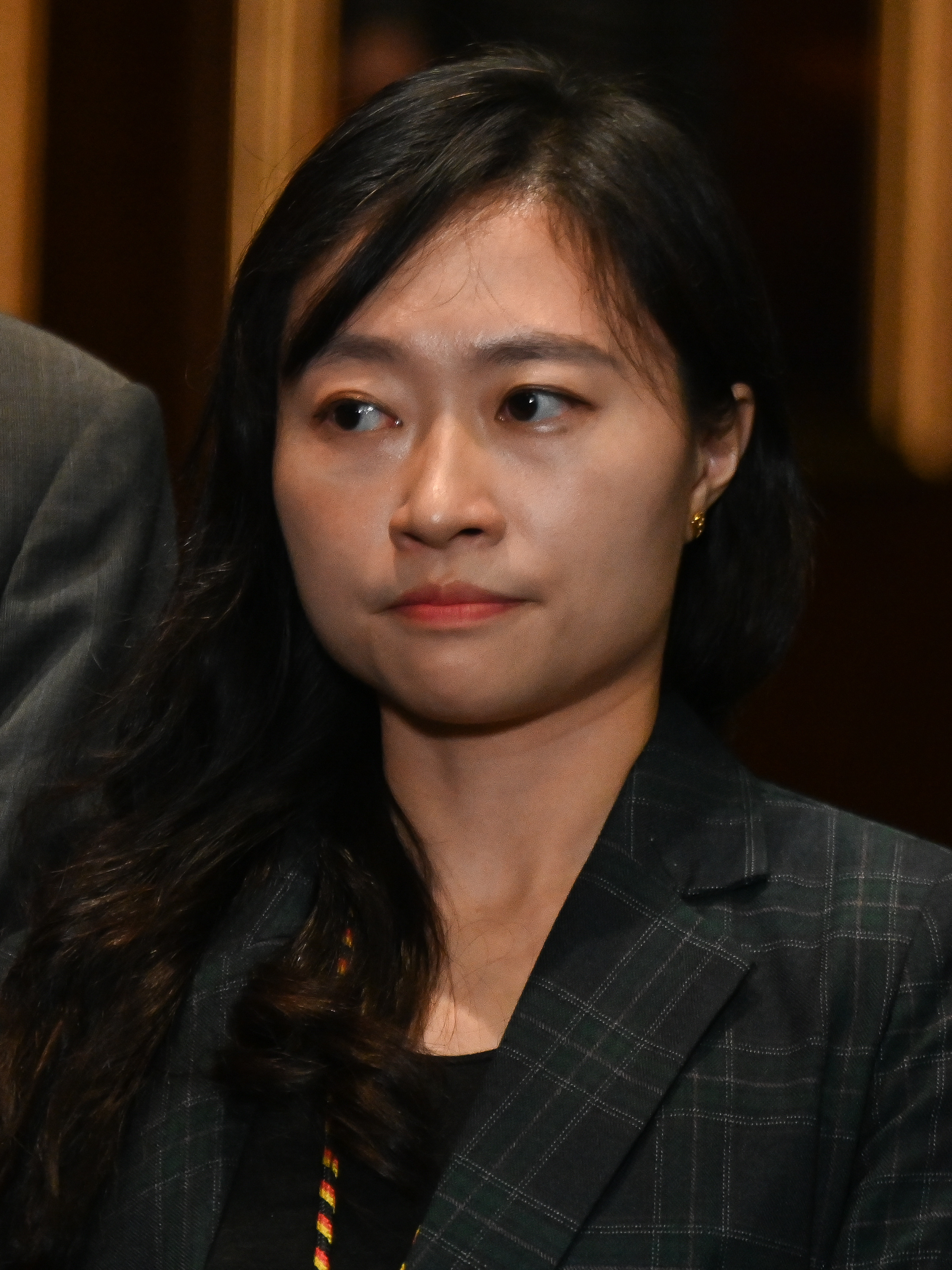
- Chan in 2024

Member of the Legislative Council
- Incumbent
- Assumed office 1 January 2022
- Preceded by: New constituency
- Constituency: New Territories South West

Member of the Sham Shui Po District Council
- In office 1 January 2016 – 31 December 2019
- Preceded by: Frederick Fung
- Succeeded by: Li Kwing
- Constituency: Lai Kok

Personal details
- Party: FTU
- Parent: Chan Chi-kwong (father)
- Education: University of Hong Kong (BEcon); University of London (LLB)

Joephy Chan Wing-yan
- Traditional Chinese: 陳穎欣
- Simplified Chinese: 陈颖欣
Transcriptions
Standard Mandarin
- Hanyu Pinyin: Chén Yǐngxīn
Yue: Cantonese
- Jyutping: can4 wing6 jan1

Joephy Chan Wing-yan (Chinese: 陳穎欣) is a Federation of Trade Unions politician in Hong Kong, who is a member of the Legislative Council since 2021, representing New Territories South West. She is a former member of the Sham Shui Po District Council for Lai Kok from 2016 to 2019.

== Biography ==
During the 2015 Hong Kong local elections, Chan represented the Federation of Trade Unions in the Lai Kok constituency seat of Sham Shui Po District Council and competed with Federick Fung, a veteran member of the Legislative Council of the ADPL. In the end, she won 2,531 votes and take the seat, while former ADPL member Wong Chung-kei got 215 votes at the same time.

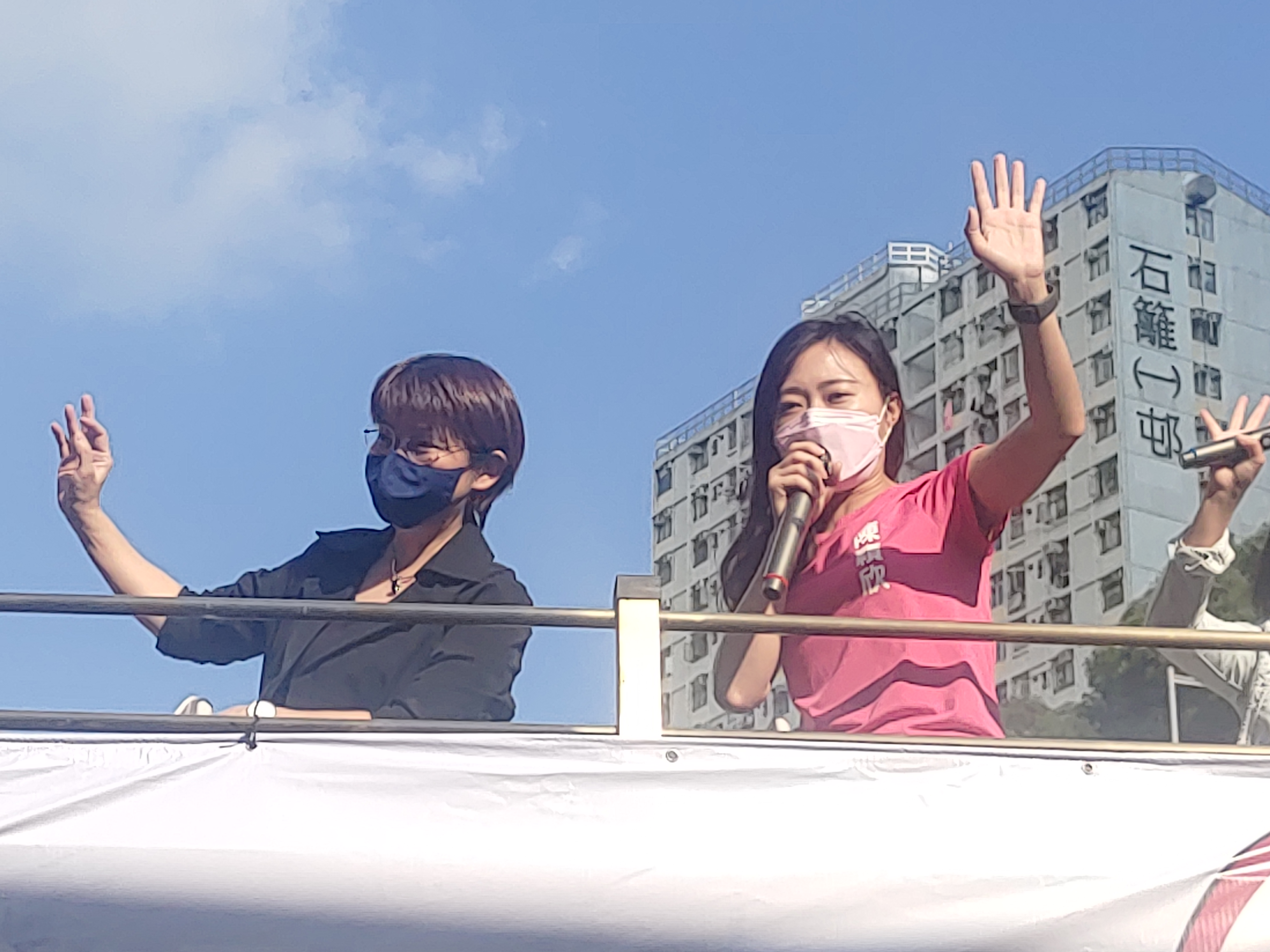
Chan (right) campaigning in 2021

After losing the district council election in 2019, she started her YouTube channel to comment on current affairs and became an internet celebrity; she also runs a YouTube channel with another unsuccessful district councillor candidate, Navis Ha Wing-ka. Her YouTube channel has more than 320,000 followers as of January 2026

== Legislative Council ==
In November 2023, she led a protest outside the US Consulate in Hong Kong, stating that her party was not afraid of US sanctions.

In February 2024, she criticized former Legislative Council President Jasper Tsang Yok-sing, claiming he was not supportive of the Article 23 legislation. However, she was later criticized by other member from DAB.

== Controversies ==
=== Fake news on COVID-19 ===
In April 2020, Chan uploaded a video suggesting the first ever COVID-19 case may have emerged earlier and originated in the U.S. or Australia, not China. The video cited a coronavirus study by a research team at the University of Cambridge, which it claimed pointed to the origin of the virus as the either of these two countries. As of 28 April, the video had received over 380,000 views. However, an investigation by Hong Kong-based news agency FactWire found that the video took the study out of context and misrepresented its findings.

Dr. Peter Forster, the expert who led the Cambridge research team, told FactWire that the purpose of the study was not to identify the origin of the virus, but rather to analyze how it mutates over time and spreads among humans. He also noted that early data showed most patients in the initial stage of the outbreak were in East Asian, suggesting that the virus was already spreading among the area during the early phase.

=== Pro-police comments ===
In September 2020, Chan and her friend, another pro-establishment figure, Navis Ha, commented on an incident involving a pregnant woman who was pushed down by police during a demonstration marking the first anniversary of the Prince Edward station attack. Chan referred to the woman as a "criminal woman" and questioned her conduct "after being interviewed by the media."

On 29 September, The then Hong Kong Police Commissioner Chris Tang addressed the incident during a Yau Tsim Mong District Council meeting. He stated that during police operations on 31 August and 6 September at the Mong Kok site, a pregnant woman had been pushed down. Tang noted that the scene was very chaotic, and while some people shouted that a pregnant woman was present, not everyone could hear it.

=== Mask ban ===
In March 2023, Chan supported a ban of face masks at lawful rallies, saying "Calling for relaxations of the mask ban is to abet chaos."

=== District Councils ===
In June 2023, Chan defended a change to district councils election, where fewer seats than before are democratically elected; Chan said "You shouldn't measure it by western values and how much it resembles the western system of politics to decide whether this is the right system for Hong Kong."

Political offices
Preceded by Frederick Fung	Member of Sham Shui Po District Council; Representative for Lai Kok; 2016–2019	Succeeded by Li Kwing
Legislative Council of Hong Kong
New constituency	Member of Legislative Council; Representative for New Territories South West; 2022–present	Incumbent
