= Ben Chan =

Hong Kong politician (born 1973)

The Honourable Chan Han-pan JP
- 陳恒鑌
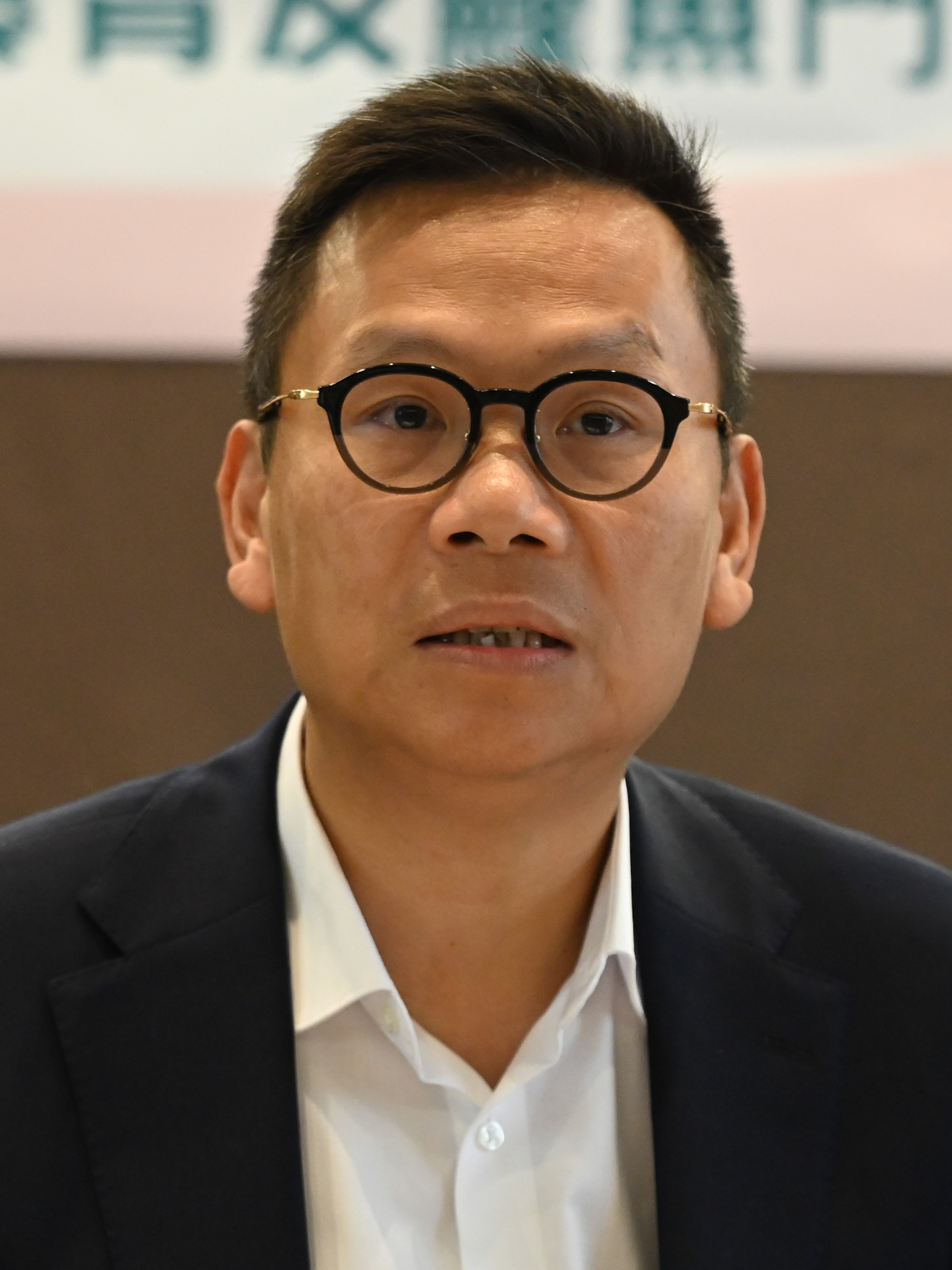
- Chan in 2024

Member of the Legislative Council
- Incumbent
- Assumed office 1 January 2022
- Preceded by: New constituency
- Constituency: New Territories South West
- In office 1 October 2012 – 31 December 2021
- Preceded by: Cheung Hok-ming
- Succeeded by: Constituency abolished
- Constituency: New Territories West

Personal details
- Born: 1973 (age 52–53) Puning, Guangdong, China
- Party: Democratic Alliance for the Betterment and Progress of Hong Kong (DAB); New Territories Association of Societies (NTAS)
- Education: Hong Kong University of Science and Technology
- Occupation: Legislative Councillor
- Profession: Engineer

Ben Chan
- Traditional Chinese: 陳恒鑌
Transcriptions
Yue: Cantonese
- Yale Romanization: Chàhn Hàhng bān
- Jyutping: Can^{4} Hang^{4} ban^{1}

Chan Han-pan (Chinese: 陳恒鑌; born 1973), also known as Ben Chan, is a member of Hong Kong Legislative Council (Election Committee constituency) since 2026. (Geographical constituency New Territories South West) and was a member of Tsuen Wan District Council (Yeung Uk Road). He is a member of Democratic Alliance for the Betterment of Hong Kong, a pro-establishment party in Hong Kong. He is an engineer and graduated from Bachelor of Mechanical Engineering and Master of Science of Material Science and Engineering of Hong Kong University of Science and Technology.

In February 2021, Chan criticized RTHK, claiming it had been abusing its editorial independence, and that the new director, Patrick Li, could fix its "credibility" issues. In contrast, the RTHK's Programme Staff Union stated that they had serious doubts about Patrick Li, and that the government had made moves to strip editorial independence from RTHK.

In December 2021, he was re-elected again through New Territories South West constituency with 83,303 votes.

In December 2025, he was re-elected again through Election Committee constituency with 1,348 votes.

== Link ==
- Ben Chan's official website

Political offices
| Preceded by Chan Yuk-man | Member of Tsuen Wan District Council; Representative for Yeung Uk Road; 2004–2019 | Succeeded by Lam Sek-tim |
Legislative Council of Hong Kong
| Preceded by Cheung Hok-ming | Member of Legislative Council; Representative for New Territories West; 2012–2021 | Constituency abolished |
| New constituency | Member of Legislative Council; Representative for New Territories South West; 2022–present | Incumbent |
Order of precedence
| Preceded by Raymond Chan; Member of the Legislative Council | Hong Kong order of precedence Member of the Legislative Council | Succeeded by Leung Che-cheung; Member of the Legislative Council |
