= New Territories South West (2021 constituency) =

Geographical constituency in Hong Kong

- Geographical constituency for the Legislative Council of Hong Kong
- Boundary of New Territories South West in Hong Kong
- District: Kwai Tsing District; Tsuen Wan District
- Region: New Territories
- Population: 824,600
- Electorate: 510,558

Current constituency
- Created: 2021
- Number of members: Two
- Members: Chan Han-pan (DAB); Joephy Chan (FTU)
- Created from: New Territories West (1998)

The New Territories South West geographical constituency is one of the ten geographical constituencies in the elections for the Legislative Council of Hong Kong which elects two members of the Legislative Council using the single non-transferable vote (SNTV) system. The constituency covers Kwai Tsing District and Tsuen Wan District in New Territories.

== History ==
The constituency was created under the overhaul of the electoral system imposed by the Beijing government in 2021, replacing Kwai Tsing District and Tsuen Wan District of the New Territories West used from 1998 to 2021. A constituency with the same name were also created for the 1995 Legislative Council election in the late colonial period.

== Returning members ==
Election	Member	Party	Member	Party
2021	Chan Han-pan	DAB	Joephy Chan	FTU

== Election results ==
=== 2020s ===
2025 Legislative Council election: New Territories South West
Party	Candidate	Votes	%	±%
DAB	Lo Yuen-ting			
DAB	Kwok Fu-yung			
FTU	Joephy Chan Wing-yan			
BPA	Mok Yee-ki			
NPP	Cheung Man-ka			
Total valid votes				
Rejected ballots				
Turnout				
Registered electors		471,978		
		Swing		
		Swing		

Vote share
1. DAB (52.5%)
2. FTU (39.5%)
3. Nonpartisan (8.08%)

2021 Legislative Council election: New Territories South West
Party	Candidate	Votes	%	±%
DAB	Chan Han-pan	83,303	52.45	
FTU	Joephy Chan Wing-yan	62,690	39.47	
Nonpartisan	Lau Cheuk-yu	12,828	8.08	
Total valid votes		158,821	100.00	
Rejected ballots		2,862		
Turnout		161,683	31.67	
Registered electors		510,558		
DAB win (new seat)				
FTU win (new seat)				
