= Tsuen Wan District Council =

Local government council in Hong Kong

Tsuen Wan District Council 荃灣區議會

Type
- Type: Hong Kong District Council of the Tsuen Wan District

History
- Founded: 1 April 1981; 44 years ago (District Board); 1 July 1997; 28 years ago (Provisional); 1 January 2000; 25 years ago (District Council)

Leadership
- Chair: Billy Au Ka-shing, Independent

Structure
- Seats: 22 councillors consisting of 4 elected members 8 district committee members 8 appointed members 2 ex-officio members
- DAB: 7 / 22
- FTU: 1 / 22
- NPP: 1 / 22
- FPHE: 1 / 22
- Independent: 12 / 22

Elections
- Voting system: First past the post
- Last election: 10 December 2023

Meeting place
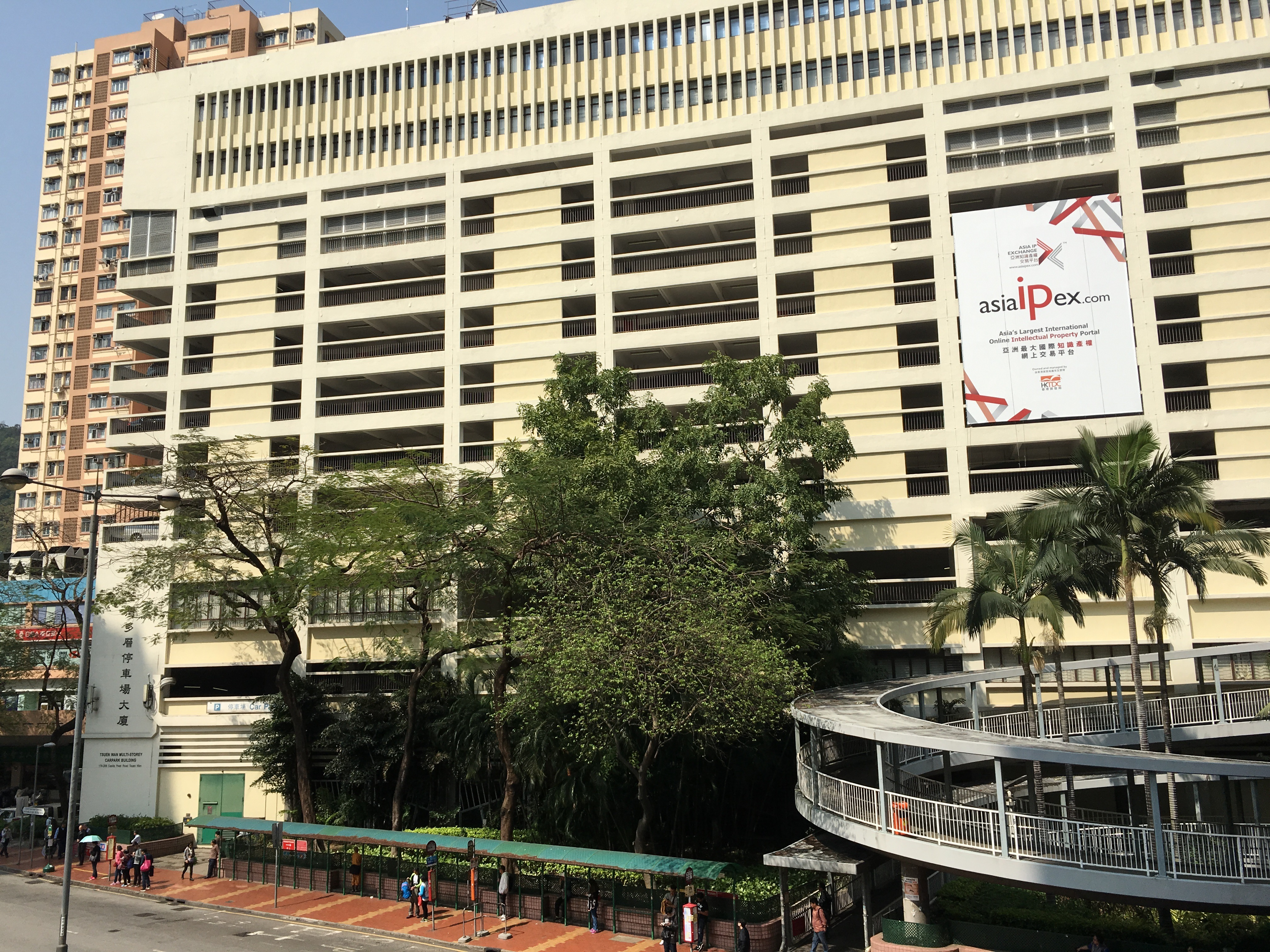
- 2/F., Tsuen Wan Multi-storey Carpark Building, 174–208 Castle Peak Road, Tsuen Wan, New Territories

Website
- www.districtcouncils.gov.hk/tw/

The Tsuen Wan District Council (Chinese: 荃灣區議會; noted as TW) is the district council for the Tsuen Wan District in Hong Kong. It is one of 18 such councils. The Tsuen Wan District Council currently consists of 22 members, of which the district is divided into two constituencies, electing a total of 4 members, 8 district committee members, 8 appointed members, and 2 ex officio members who is the Tsuen Wan and Ma Wan rural committee chairmen. The latest election was held on 10 December 2023.

== History ==
The Tsuen Wan District Council was established on 1 April 1981 under the name of the Tsuen Wan District Board as one of the eight New Territories District Boards as the result of the colonial Governor Murray MacLehose's District Administration Scheme reform. However, it was regarded as among the oldest District Boards since its precursor, the Tsuen Wan New Town Recreation and Amenities (Advisory) Committee, was founded in March 1976 which gave rise to the Tsuen Wan District Advisory Board in 1977 and was retitled the Tsuen Wan District Board in 1981. The District Board was partly elected with the ex-officio Regional Council members and Tsuen Wan and Ma Wan Rural Committees' chairmen, as well as members appointed by the Governor until 1994 when last Governor Chris Patten refrained from appointing any member.

The Tsuen Wan District originally included also today's Kwai Tsing District until 1985 when a new District Board was set up for Kwai Chung and Tsing Yi due to its large population. The Tsuen Wan District Board became Tsuen Wan Provisional District Board after the Hong Kong Special Administrative Region (HKSAR) was established in 1997 with the appointment system being reintroduced by Chief Executive Tung Chee-hwa. The current Tsuen Wan District Council was established on 1 January 2000 after the first District Council election in 1999. The appointed seats were abolished in 2015 after the modified constitutional reform proposal was passed by the Legislative Council in 2010.

The Tsuen Wan District Council has been dominated by the conservative independents. Former Democratic Party Legislative Councillor Albert Chan also had a long base in the district before he gave up his seat to contest in Tuen Mun against Democrat chairman Albert Ho for the People Power. As the Democratic Party's influence slowly declined and received their territory-wide defeat in the 2007 election, the Democratic Alliance for the Betterment and Progress of Hong Kong (DAB) gradually became the largest party in the council, returning its long-time district councillor Chan Han-pan to the Legislative Council since 2012. The Civic Party has also been established its base in Lei Muk Shue with veteran councillor Sumly Chan, while New People's Party (NPP) Michael Tien also set a foothold at the Discovery Park since 2011, until he quit the NPP in 2016.

The pro-democrats seized the control of the council in the historic landslide victory in the 2019 election amid the massive pro-democracy protests by taking 16 of the 19 elected seats in the council. The pro-Beijing camp suffered devastating defeats, with incumbent legislators Chan Han-pan failing to pass his seat to his successor and Michael Tien losing his seat to new challenger Lau Cheuk-yu of the newly-founded local-based Deliberation Tsuen Wan.

== Political control ==
Since 1982 political control of the council has been held by the following parties:

| Camp in control | Largest party | Years | Composition |
|---|---|---|---|
| No Overall Control | Civic Association | 1982–1985 | |
| Pro-government | Civic Association | 1985–1988 | |
| Pro-government | ADPL → United Democrats | 1988–1991 | |
| Pro-government | United Democrats | 1991–1994 | |
| Pro-Beijing | Democratic | 1994–1997 | |
| Pro-Beijing | Democratic | 1997–1999 | |
| Pro-Beijing | Democratic | 2000–2003 | |
| Pro-Beijing | Democratic | 2004–2007 | |
| Pro-Beijing | DAB/Democratic → DAB | 2008–2011 | |
| Pro-Beijing | DAB | 2012–2015 | |
| Pro-Beijing | DAB | 2016–2019 | |
| Pro-democracy → NOC | Civic → None | 2020–2023 | |
| Pro-Beijing | DAB | 2024–2027 | |

== Political makeup ==

Elections are held every four years.

| Political party | Council members | | | | | | | Current members |
| Political party | 1994 | 1999 | 2003 | 2007 | 2011 | 2015 | 2019 | Current members |
|---|---|---|---|---|---|---|---|---|
| Independent | 9 | 7 | 9 | 7 | 7 | 6 | 4 | 8 / 21 |
| Democratic | 2 | 6 | 5 | 3 | 1 | 1 | 3 | 3 / 21 |
| DTW | - | - | - | - | - | 0 | 2 | 1 / 21 |
| FTU | - | - | - | - | 1 | 1 | 1 | 1 / 21 |
| Labour | - | - | - | - | - | - | 1 | 1 / 21 |
| FPHE | - | - | - | - | - | - | 1 | 1 / 21 |
| TWCN | - | - | - | - | - | - | 1 | 1 / 21 |

== District result maps ==
1994

1999

2003

2007

2011

2015

2019

== Members represented ==
| Capacity | Code | Constituency | Name | Political affiliation | Term | | Notes |
|---|---|---|---|---|---|---|---|
| Elected | K01 | Tsuen Wan Northwest | Kot Siu-yuen | FTU | 1 January 2024 | Incumbent | |
| Elected | K01 | Tsuen Wan Northwest | Matthew Wong Kai-chun | DAB | 1 January 2024 | Incumbent | |
| Elected | K02 | Tsuen Wan Southeast | Ng Chun-yu | DAB | 1 January 2024 | Incumbent | |
| Elected | K02 | Tsuen Wan Southeast | Sam Fung Cheuk-sam | FPHE | 1 January 2024 | Incumbent | |
| District Committees | | | Tsang Tai | DAB | 1 January 2024 | Incumbent | |
| District Committees | | | Jones Chan Chun-chung | DAB | 1 January 2024 | Incumbent | |
| District Committees | | | Marco Chow Sum-ming | DAB | 1 January 2024 | Incumbent | |
| District Committees | | | Lau Chung-kong | DAB | 1 January 2024 | Incumbent | |
| District Committees | | | Marcus Mok Yuen-kwan | Independent | 1 January 2024 | Incumbent | |
| District Committees | | | Wyran Cheng Chit-pun | Independent | 1 January 2024 | Incumbent | |
| District Committees | | | Chu Tak-wing | Independent | 1 January 2024 | Incumbent | |
| District Committees | | | Lam Yuen-pun | Independent | 1 January 2024 | Incumbent | |
| Appointed | | | Koo Yeung-pong | DAB | 1 January 2024 | Incumbent | |
| Appointed | | | Marcella Cheung Man-ka | NPP | 1 January 2024 | Incumbent | |
| Appointed | | | Luparker Wong Shuk-fan | Independent | 1 January 2024 | Incumbent | |
| Appointed | | | Raymond Leung Cheong-ming | Independent | 1 January 2024 | Incumbent | |
| Appointed | | | Chan Shun-shun | Independent | 1 January 2024 | Incumbent | |
| Appointed | | | Chan Hiu-chun | Independent | 1 January 2024 | Incumbent | |
| Appointed | | | Wah Mei-ling | Independent | 1 January 2024 | Incumbent | |
| Appointed | | | Wong Wai-kit | Independent | 1 January 2024 | Incumbent | |
| Ex Officio | | Ma Wan Rural Committee Chairman | Chan Sung-ip | Independent | 1 January 2024 | Incumbent | |
| Ex Officio | | Tsuen Wan Rural Committee Chairman | Yau Kam-ping | Independent | 1 January 2024 | Incumbent | |

== Leadership ==
=== Chairs ===
Since 1985, the chairman is elected by all the members of the board:

| Chairman | Years | Political Affiliation |
|---|---|---|
| James Hayes | 1981–1982 | District Officer |
| N. W. H. Macleod | 1982–1983 | District Officer |
| Adolf H. Hsu | 1983–1985 | District Officer |
| Chau How-chen | 1985–1994 | Independent |
| Chan Lau-fong | 1994–1999 | Heung Yee Kuk |
| Chau How-chen | 2000–2011 | Independent |
| Star Chan Iu-seng | 2012–2015 | Independent |
| Chung Wai-ping | 2016–2019 | Heung Yee Kuk |
| Wong Wai-kit | 2019 | Independent |
| Sumly Chan Yuen-sum | 2020–2023 | Civic→Independent |
| Billy Au Ka-shing | 2024–present | District Officer |

=== Vice Chairs ===
| Vice Chairman | Years | Political Affiliation |
|---|---|---|
| Chan Wai-ming | 2000–2003 | Independent |
| Chung Wai-ping | 2004–2015 | Heung Yee Kuk |
| Wong Wai-kit | 2016–2019 | Independent |
| Chan Sung-ip | 2019 | Heung Yee Kuk |
| Li Hung-por | 2020–2021 | Democratic |
| Yau Kam-ping | 2021–2023 | Independent |
