= Ting Tsz-yuen =

Ting Tsz-yuen (Chinese: 丁仕元; born 1979) is a Hong Kong pro-democracy politician and a former member of the Sha Tin District Council for Kam Ying. A former Frontier and Democratic Party member, Ting is also a current convenor of the local political group Community Sha Tin and the deputy convenor of the Community Alliance. Mr Ting born in Hong Kong, and his ancestral hometown is Dongguan city( 東莞市）， Guangdong province.

== Biography ==
He had been a long-time assistant for Legislative Councillor Emily Lau. In the 2003 District Council elections, he was first elected to the Sha Tin District Council by defeating Wong Mo-tai of the Democratic Alliance for the Betterment of Hong Kong (DAB) by a margin of 222 votes in Yiu On. He was seen as the high-flyer in The Frontier, along with Sai Kung District Councillor Ricky Or, Tai Po District Councillor Au Chun-wah and Emily Lau's assistant Li Wing-shing. However in the 2007 District Council elections when seeking for re-election, Ting lost his seat to DAB's Wong Mo-tai by 536 votes.

Ting joined the Democratic Party when Emily Lau decided to merge The Frontier and the Democrats in 2008. He contested again in the 2011 District Council elections but was failed to get elected. In 2013 He contested in the Tin Sum by-election but was defeated by Civil Force's Pun Kwok-shan. He eventually returned to the Sha Tin District Council when he was elected in Kam Ying in the 2015 District Council elections. He also stood in the 2016 Legislative Council election where he stood in New Territories East on the Democratic ticket behind Lam Cheuk-ting, who defeated Ting-endorsed Au Chun-wah in the intra-party primary, and Emily Lau and successfully got Lam elected.

Ting was involved in the intra-party conflict between the former Frontier members and Lam Cheuk-ting within the New Territories East branch. In December 2018, Ting became one of the 59 party members quit the Democrats, including Ricky Or, Au Chun-wah and Li Wing-shing. Prior to that, Ting formed the district-based Community Sha Tin with other pro-democracy District Councillors in which he was a convenor.

In May 2019, Ting formed the Community Alliance with other former Democratic Party District Councillors and members, where he became a deputy convenor.

Political offices
Preceded by Wong Mo-tai	Member of Sha Tin District Council; Representative for Yiu On; 2004–2007	Succeeded by Wong Mo-tai
Preceded by Tong Po-chun	Member of Sha Tin District Council; Representative for Kam Ying; 2016–2021	Vacant
