= Wan Shing (constituency) =

Hong Kong constituency

- Elected constituency for the Sha Tin District Council
- Boundary of Wan Shing in Sha Tin District
- District: Sha Tin
- Legislative Council constituency: New Territories North East
- Population: 20,104 (2019)
- Electorate: 9,229 (2019)

Current constituency
- Created: 2015
- Number of members: One
- Member: Vacant
- Created from: Lower Shing Mun

Wan Shing (Chinese: 雲城; Jyutping: Wan^{4} Sing^{4}) is one of the 38 constituencies in the Sha Tin District in Hong Kong.

The constituency returns one district councillor to the Sha Tin District Council, with an election every four years.

Wan Shing constituency is loosely based on part of the Holford Gardens, Festival City and Carado Garden in Tai Wai with an estimated population of 20,104.

The Chinese name of the constituency, 雲城, is based on the Chinese names of Carado Garden (雲疊花園) and Festival City (名城).

== Councillors represented ==
Election	Member	Party
2015	Ho Hau-cheung	NPP/CF
2019	Cheung Hing-wa→Vacant	Neo Democrats→Independent

== Election results ==
=== 2010s ===
Sha Tin District Council Election, 2019: Wan Shing
Party	Candidate	Votes	%	±%
Neo Democrats	Cheung Hing-wa	3,869	56.68	
Civil Force (NPP)	Law Kin-kan	2,745	40.21	−11.09
2047 HK Monitor	Cheung Tak-wing	212	3.11	
Majority		1,124	16.47	
Turnout		6,843	74.15	
Neo Democrats hold		Swing		

Sha Tin District Council Election, 2015: Wan Shing
Party	Candidate	Votes	%	±%
NPP (Civil Force)	Ho Hau-cheung	1,989	51.3	
Ind. democrat	Wong Leung-hi	962	24.8	
Nonpartisan	Cheung Tak-wing	927	23.9	
Majority		1,027	6.5	
Turnout		3,911	44.2	
NPP win (new seat)				
