= King Yin Lei =

- 景賢里 (Chinese)
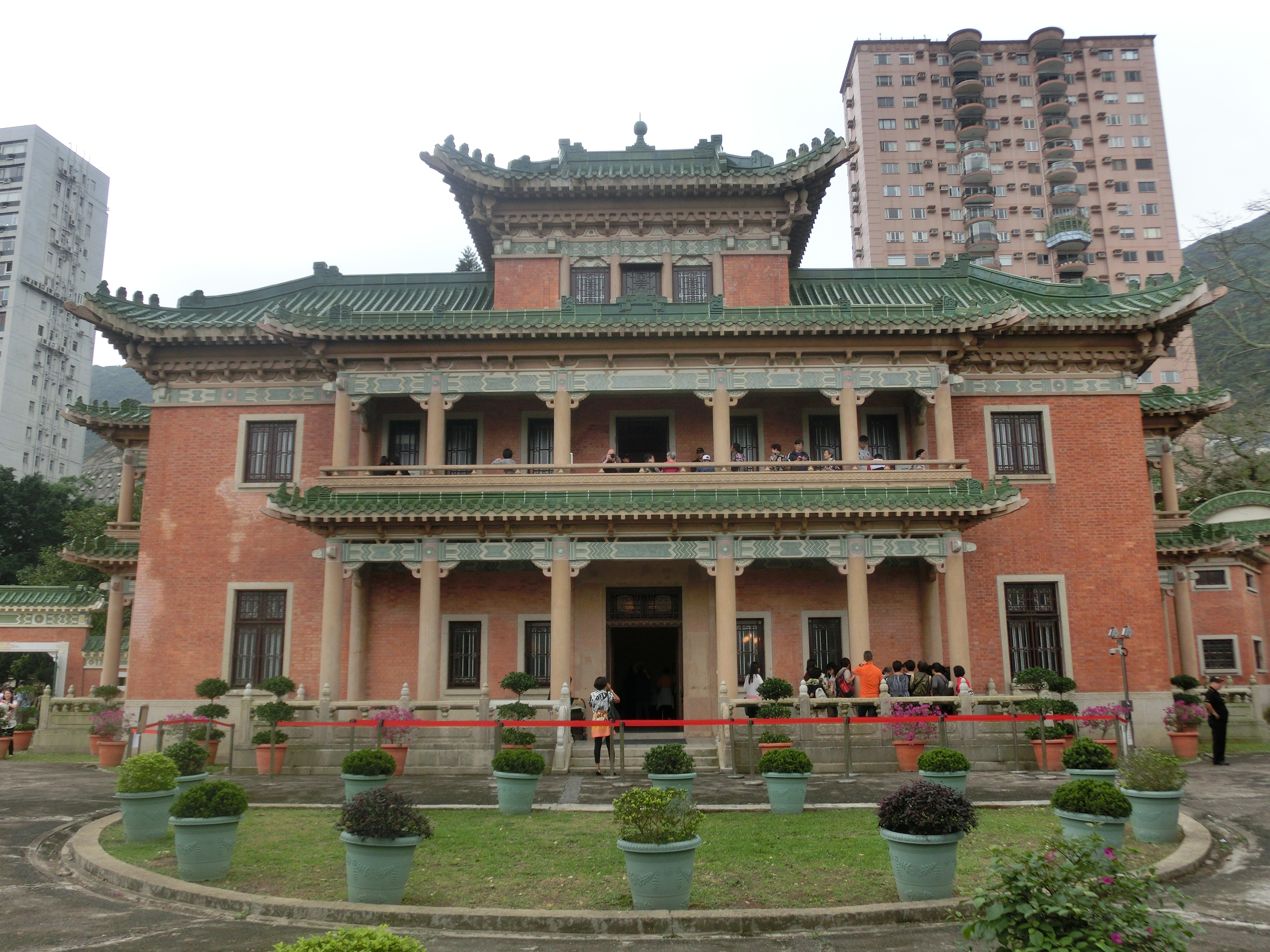
- Interactive map of King Yin Lei
- 22°16′00.21″N 114°10′51.11″E
- Location: 45 Stubbs Road, Mid-Levels, Hong Kong

History
- Built: 1936-1937

Site notes
- Area: Hong Kong
- Architect: A.R. Fenton-Rayen
- Architectural styles: Chinese classic Chinese Renaissance
- Restored: 2008-2010
- Owner: Government of the Hong Kong Special Administrative Region

Declared Monument of Hong Kong
- Designated: 11 July 2008; 18 years ago
- Reference no.: M0085

King Yin Lei
- Traditional Chinese: 景賢里
- Simplified Chinese: 景贤里
Transcriptions
Standard Mandarin
- Hanyu Pinyin: Jǐng Xián Lǐ
Yue: Cantonese
- Jyutping: ging2 jin4 lei5

King Yin Lei (Chinese: 景賢里) is a historic mansion in the Mid-Levels area of Hong Kong. It is within the Wan Chai District.

== Development ==
The mansion was designed by British architect A. R. Fenton-Raven (husband of Viola, father of Wynne (Ward) and Dorothy (Balean)). Construction began in 1936 and was completed by 1937. It sits on a 50,650-square-foot (4,706 m^{2}) site above Happy Valley Racecourse. The compound comprises a three-storey "red bricks and green tiles" building, a private garden festooned with penjing plants, various pavilions and terraces.

== Conservation ==
The property was offered for sale in early 2004. Despite claims that it was likely that the new buyer would demolish the property and redevelop it, the Government of Hong Kong did not act.

The Conservancy Association of Hong Kong, a heritage advocacy group, wrote to the Secretary for Home Affairs Patrick Ho in April 2004 requesting him to consider declaring the mansion a monument under the Antiquities and Monuments Ordinance. The Association also organised a "Save King Yin Lei Campaign" in June and generated public discussion. Yow Mok Shing then announced that he would not sell the building for the moment.

The Government of Hong Kong did not act to preserve the building, arguing that it was private property and had not used its allocated land mass to the fullest. If the government was to declare it a historical building, thus forbidding the demolition and any further development on the site, it would have to pay a large amount of compensation to the owner, in the millions.

The owner wrote to the government on the preservation of the site but received no reply. Later, Secretary for Development Carrie Lam admitted it was insensitive of her department not to do so.

On 11 September 2007, dump trucks were spotted at the site. Parts of the roof were removed. All three Chinese characters on a front gate plaque were chiselled away by workers. The Conservancy Association of Hong Kong expressed disappointment that the government had not been able to preserve the estate. When the start of demolition was reported in the Hong Kong media, the government declared the site a proposed monument and ordered a work stoppage.

On 25 January 2008, the government reached a preliminary understanding with the owner on a possible preservation option for the mansion. Under the agreement, the owner surrendered King Yin Lei's entire site to the government after restoration. Subject to the necessary town planning approval, the government would grant an adjacent man-made slope site of a size similar to King Yin Lei to the owner for development, subject to the same plot ratio of 0.5 and a height restriction of three storeys.

Conservation work was undertaken from 2008 to December 2010. The roof was restored in Phase One, including about 50,000 glazed roof tiles from Guangdong Province. Phase Two involved the exterior walls and the mansion's interior. In late 2010, the restoration was considered to be "substantially completed" and management of the property was taken over by the government of Hong Kong. It is graded as a declared Monument.

== Current use ==
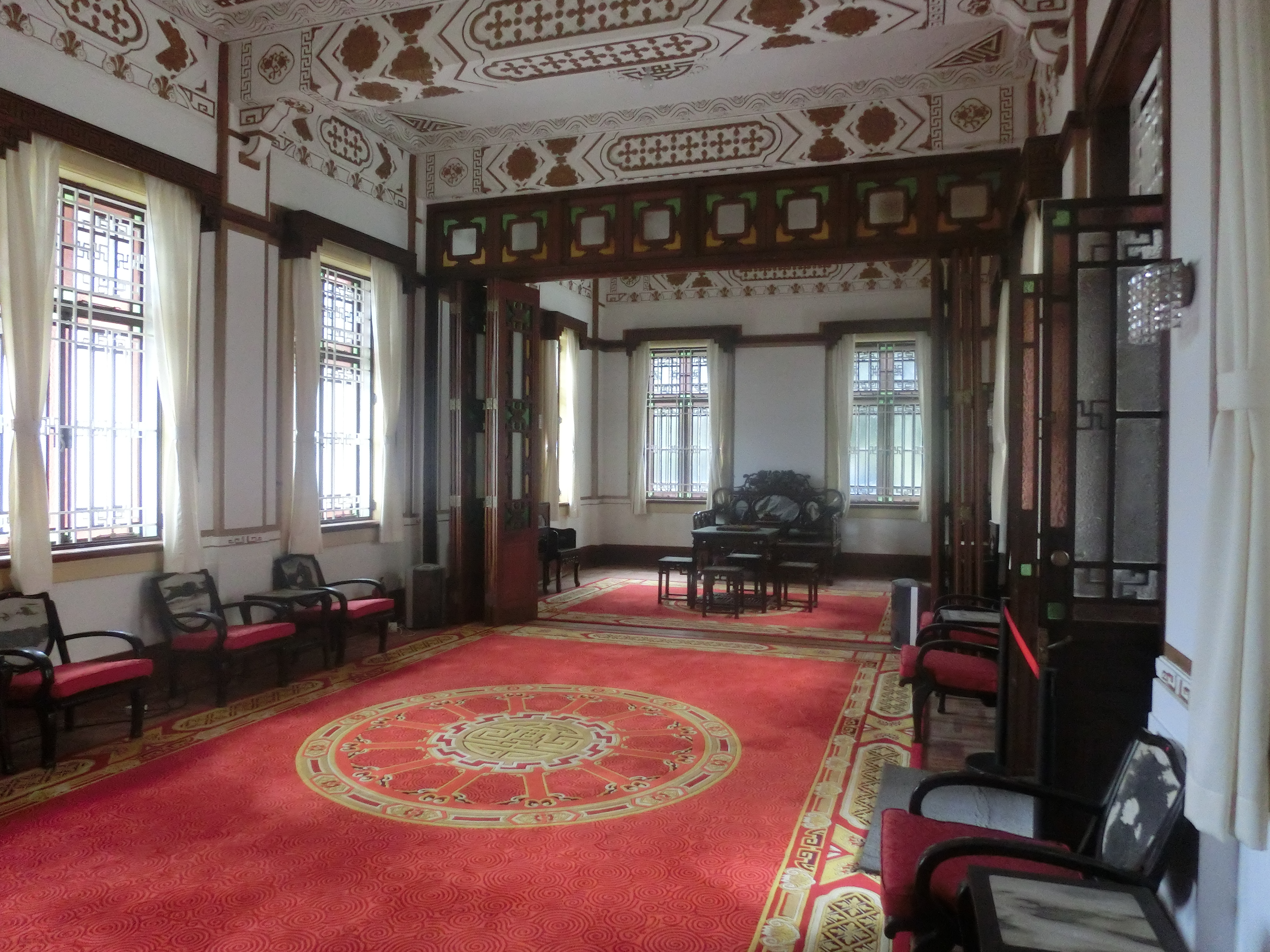
One of the grand reception rooms, possibly Rosewood Hall on the first floor (2013)

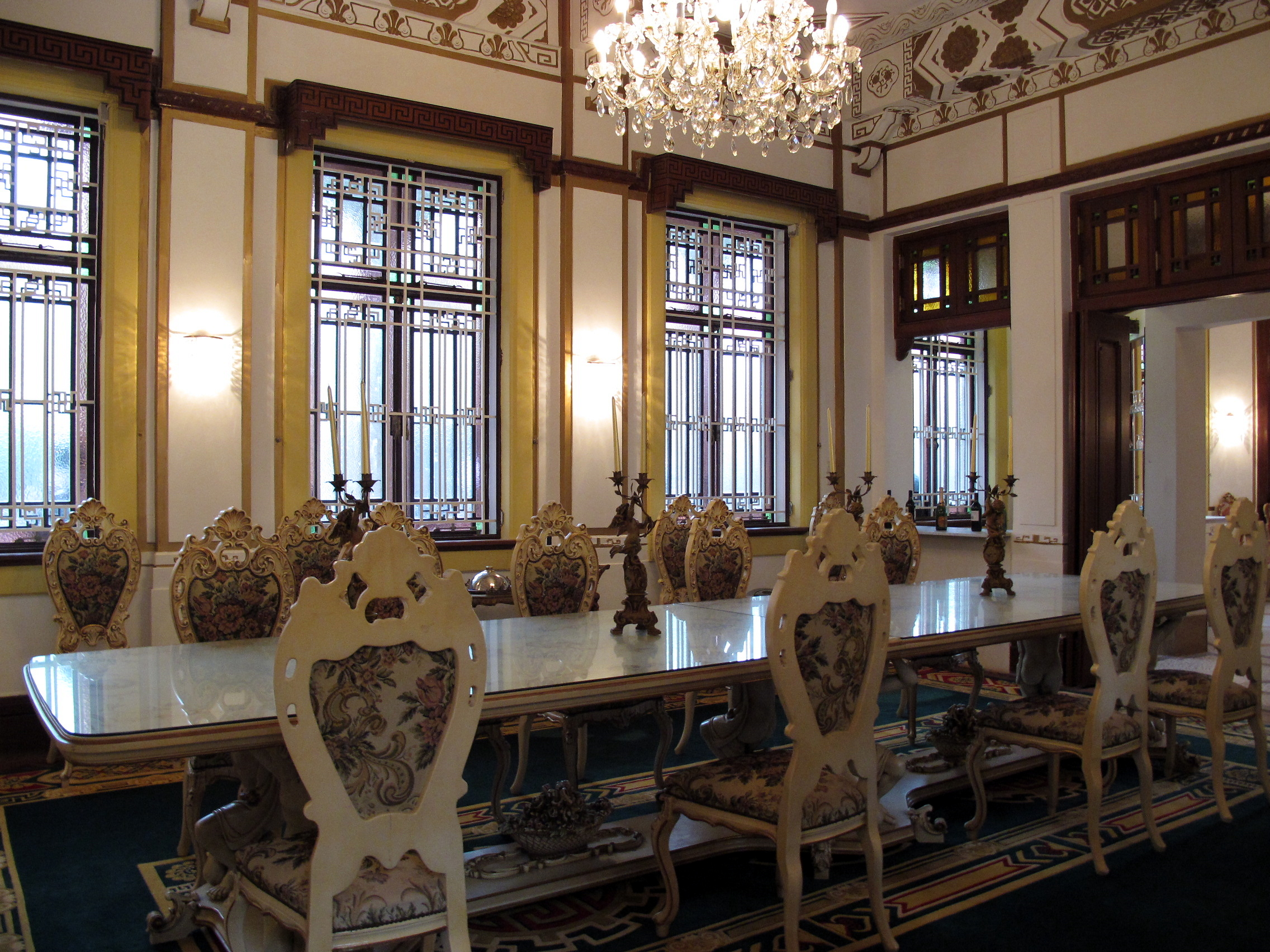
West Side Hall

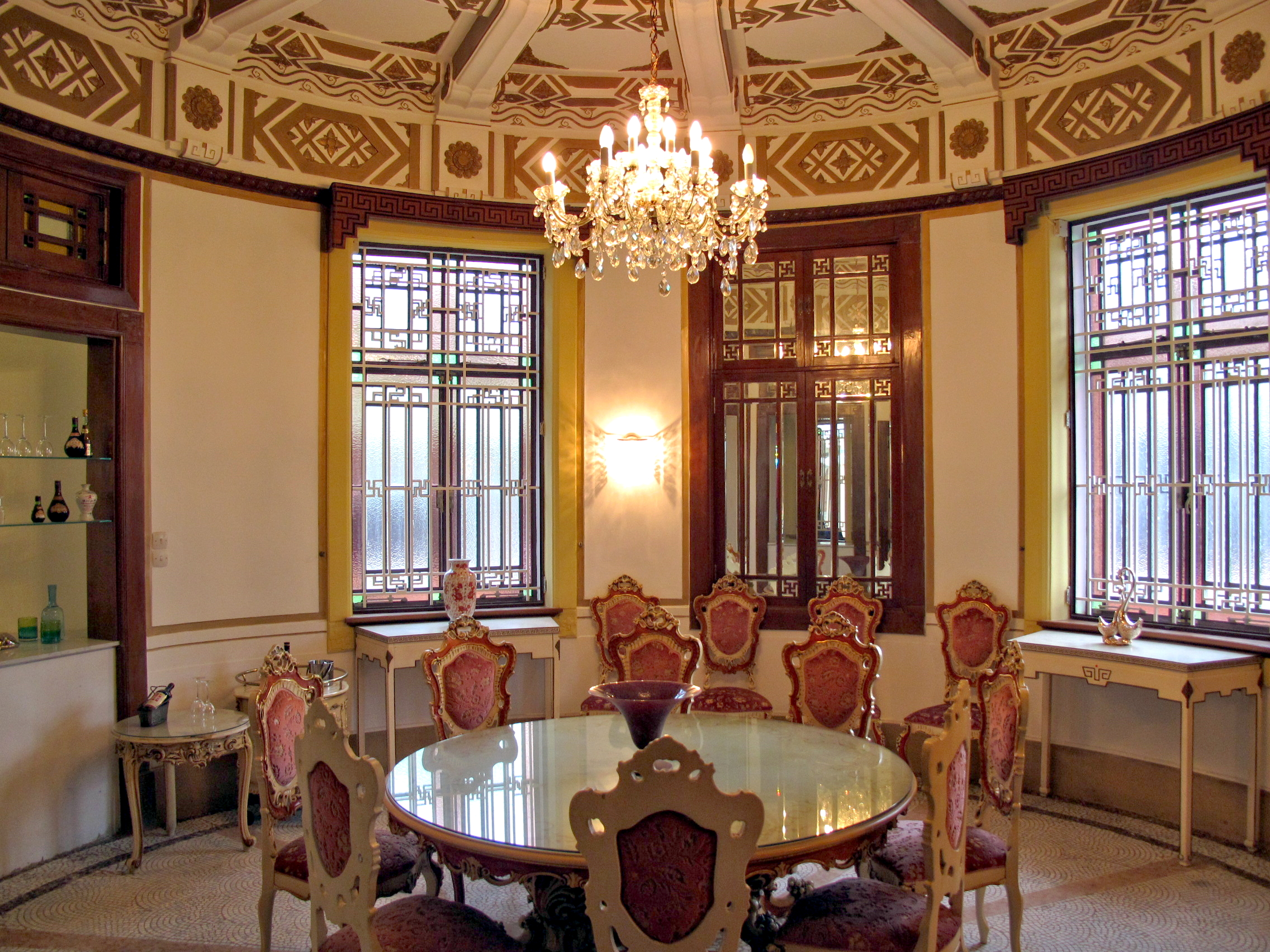
Round Room

King Yin Lei remains vacant as of 2018. Its high-grade status as a monument means that it cannot be altered for commercial re-use.

However, the government hosts several open houses throughout the year, during which the public can tour the monument. Tickets for timed sessions are distributed for free in advance. Visitors can view the mansion, including a few rooms that have been furnished with antiques, and the grounds.

In 2019, King Yin Lei was included in Batch VI of the Revitalising Historic Buildings Through Partnership Scheme. The Scheme seeks public participation in preserving historic buildings and putting them to good use. Proposals were due in September 2020.

In June 2022, the Tianda Institute, a think tank owned by Hong Kong businessman Fang Wenquan, was selected from 18 applicants to operate the mansion. The group plans to build a one storey annex for a tea studio at the mansion and use the villa as a learning centre to promote Chinese culture, history and environmental studies. In addition, the Tianda Group plans to build a restaurant within the mansion to serve Indian and Chinese cuisine.

== In popular culture ==
The building has been featured in several films and TV series over the years. In Enter the Dragon, it can be seen both on the black and white composite photo used to represent Han's Island during Lee's briefing with Braithewaite, and as a long shot as Lee enters Han's island. Two films were shot at King Yin Lei in 1955: Love Is a Many-Splendored Thing and Clark Gable's Soldier of Fortune. The TV series Yesterday's Glitter (京華春夢) starring Liza Wang was shot inside the mansion.

== Gallery ==
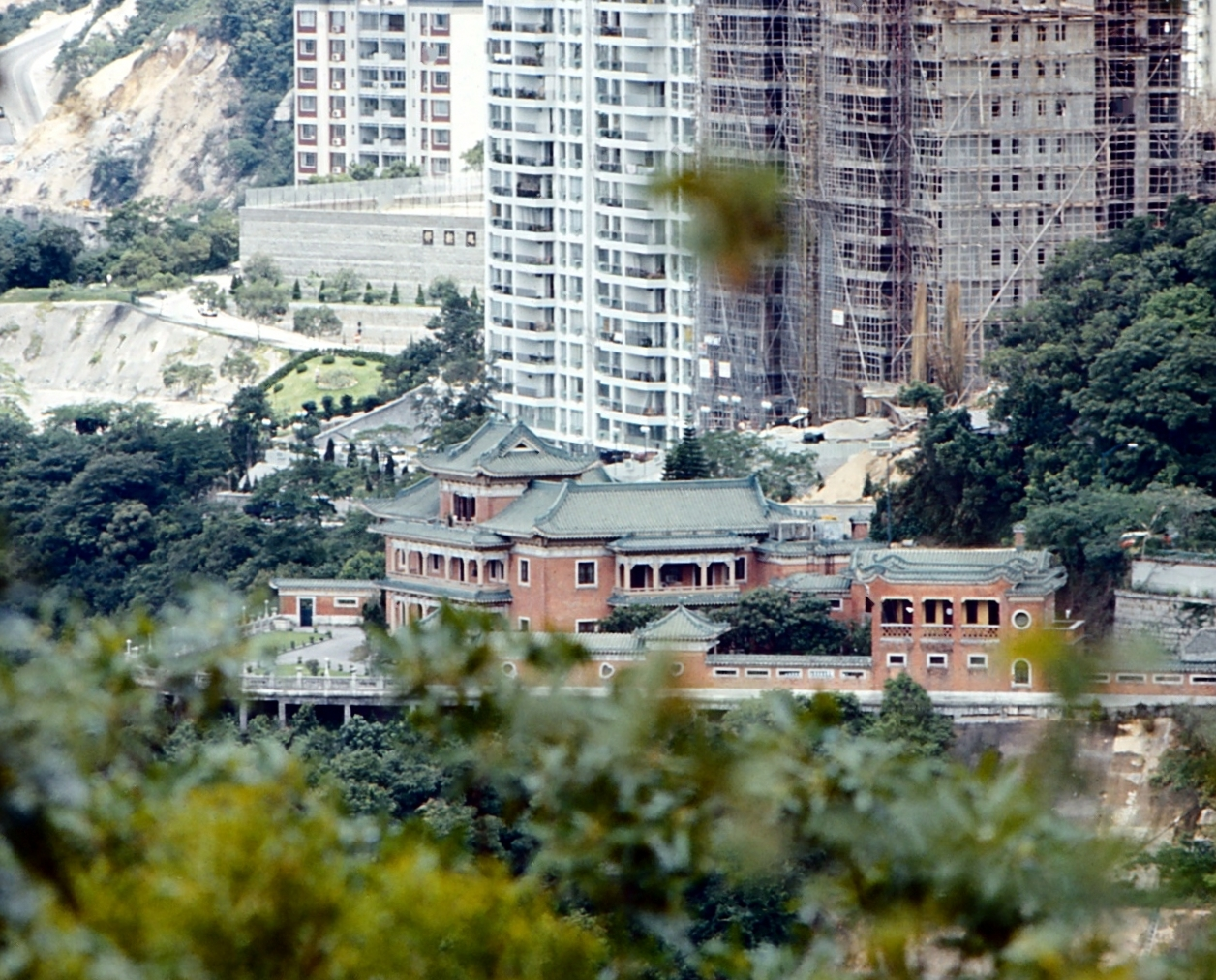
Aerial view of King Yin Lei (1971)

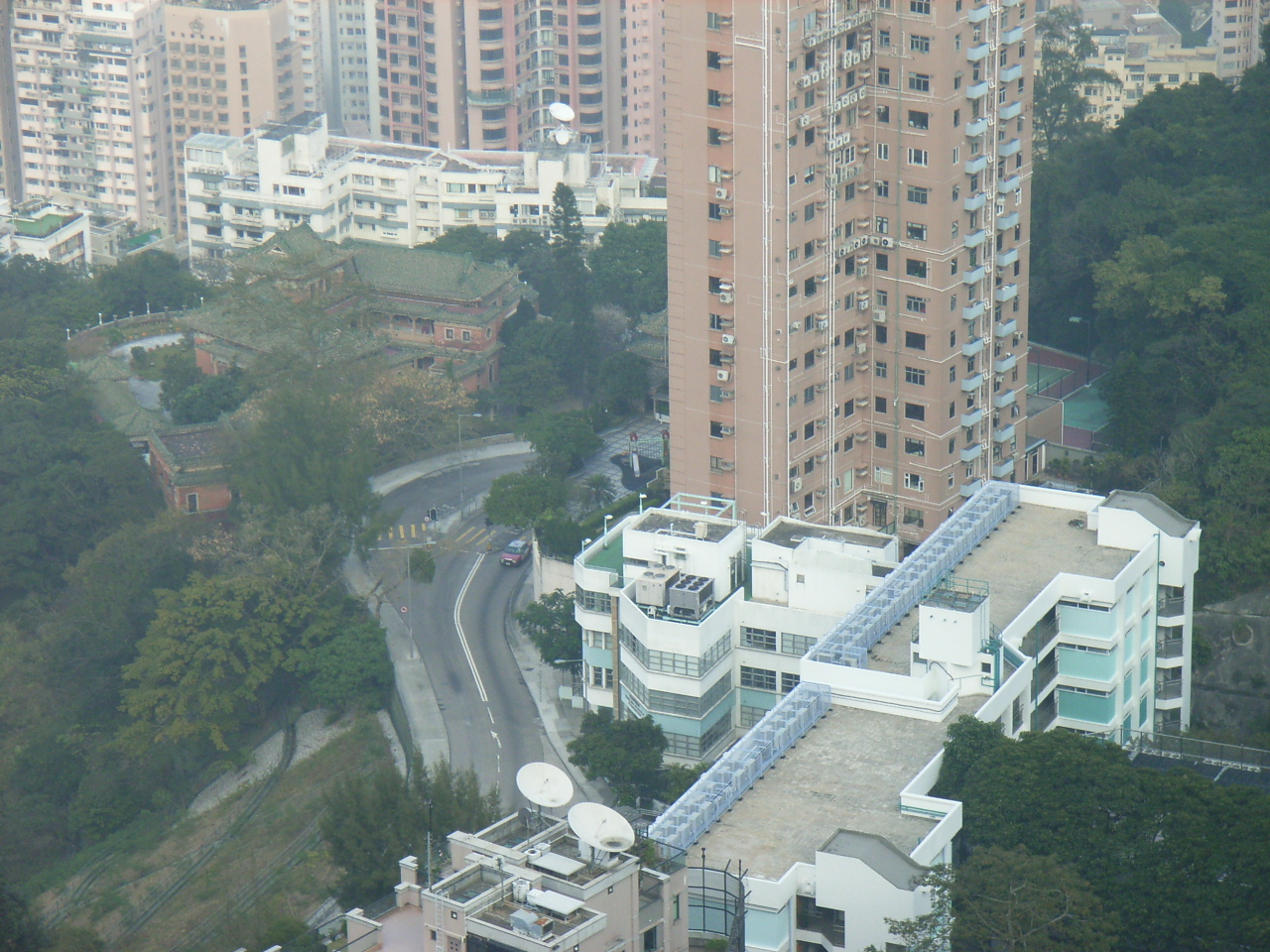
Aerial view of King Yin Lei (2007)

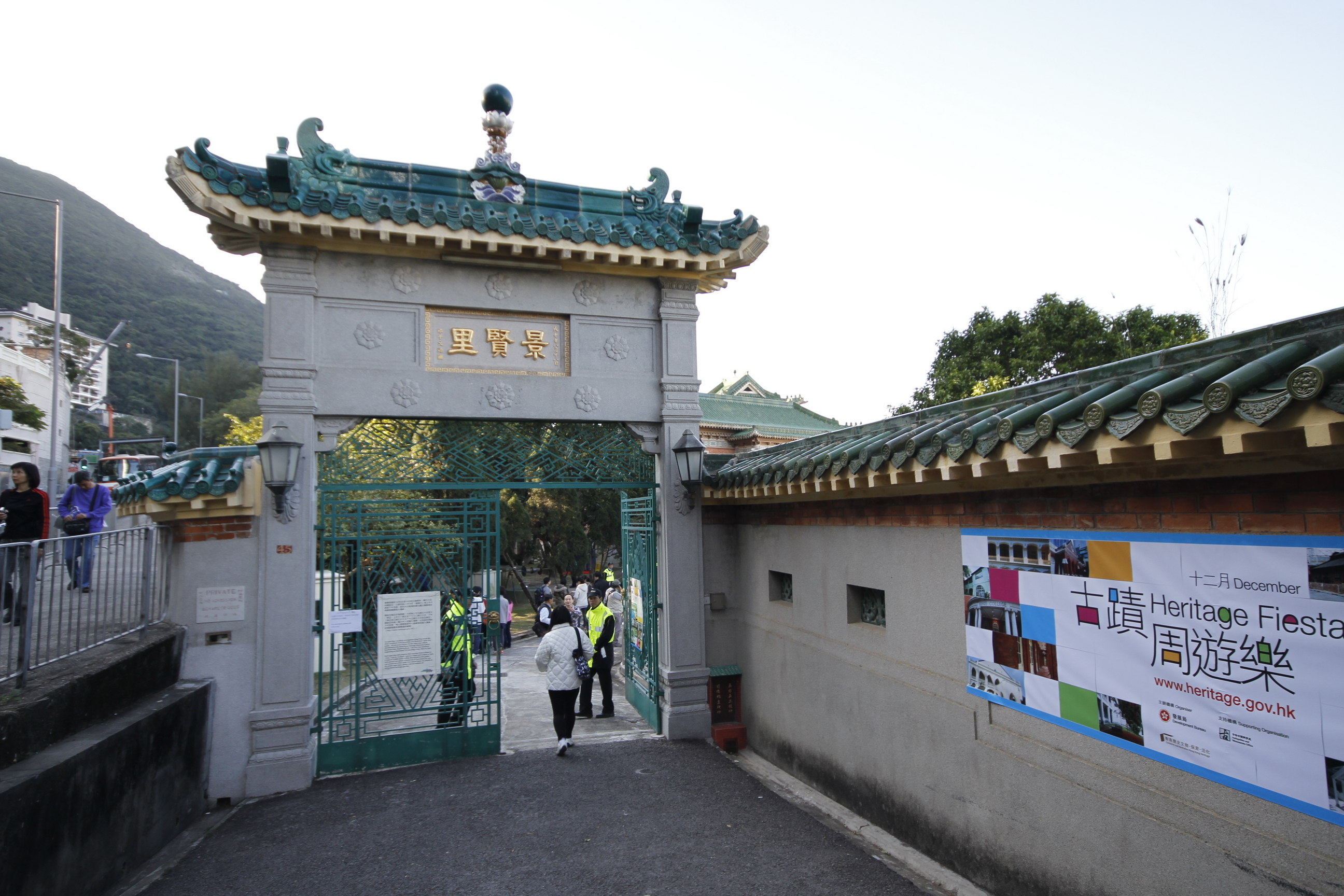
Green gates to the compound, during an open house (2011)

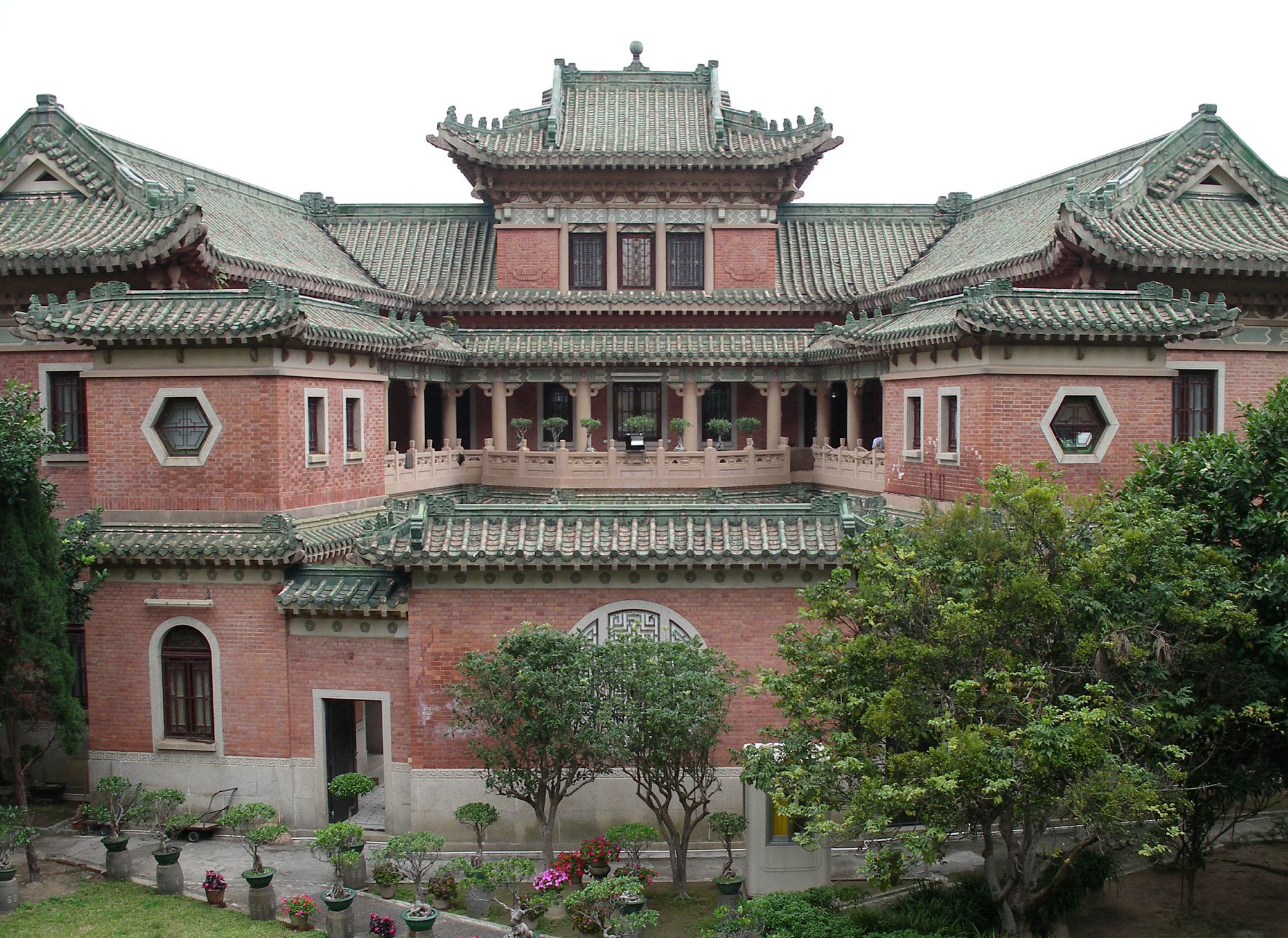
Internal courtyard of the mansion, looking North, showing the three-sided veranda on the first floor and the building's swooping green rooflines

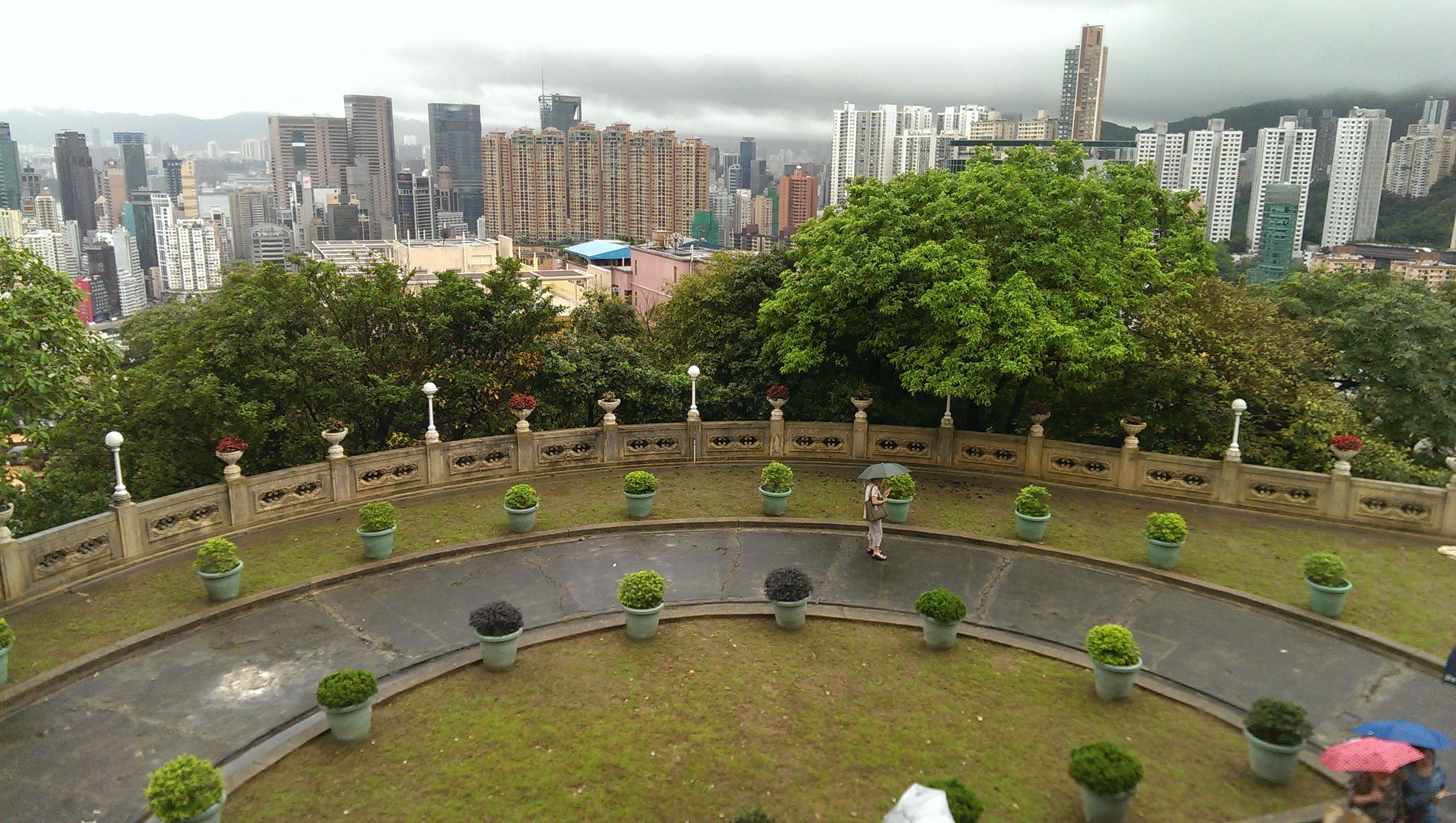
View of Hong Kong from the mansion

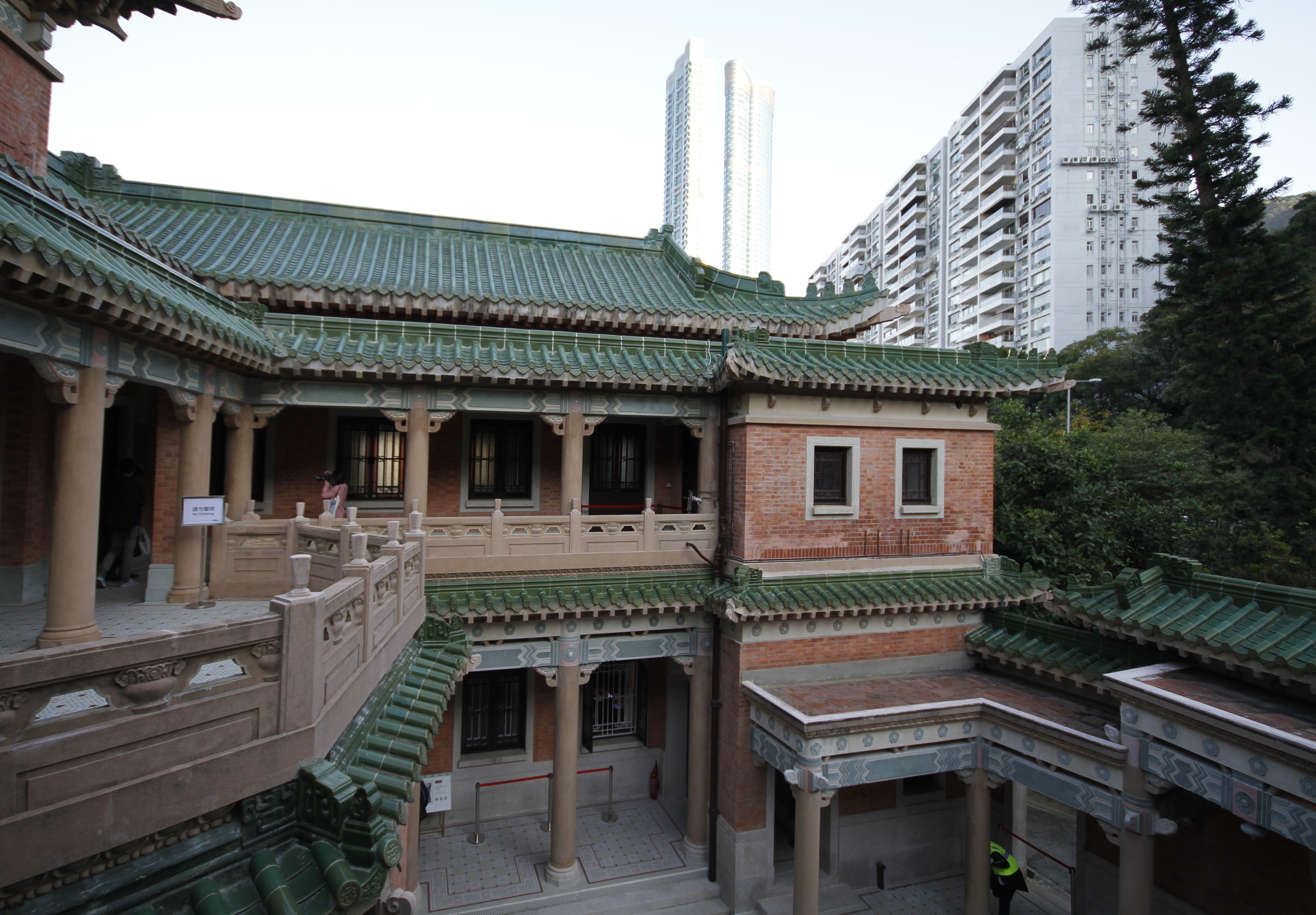
Wrapping veranda and internal courtyard

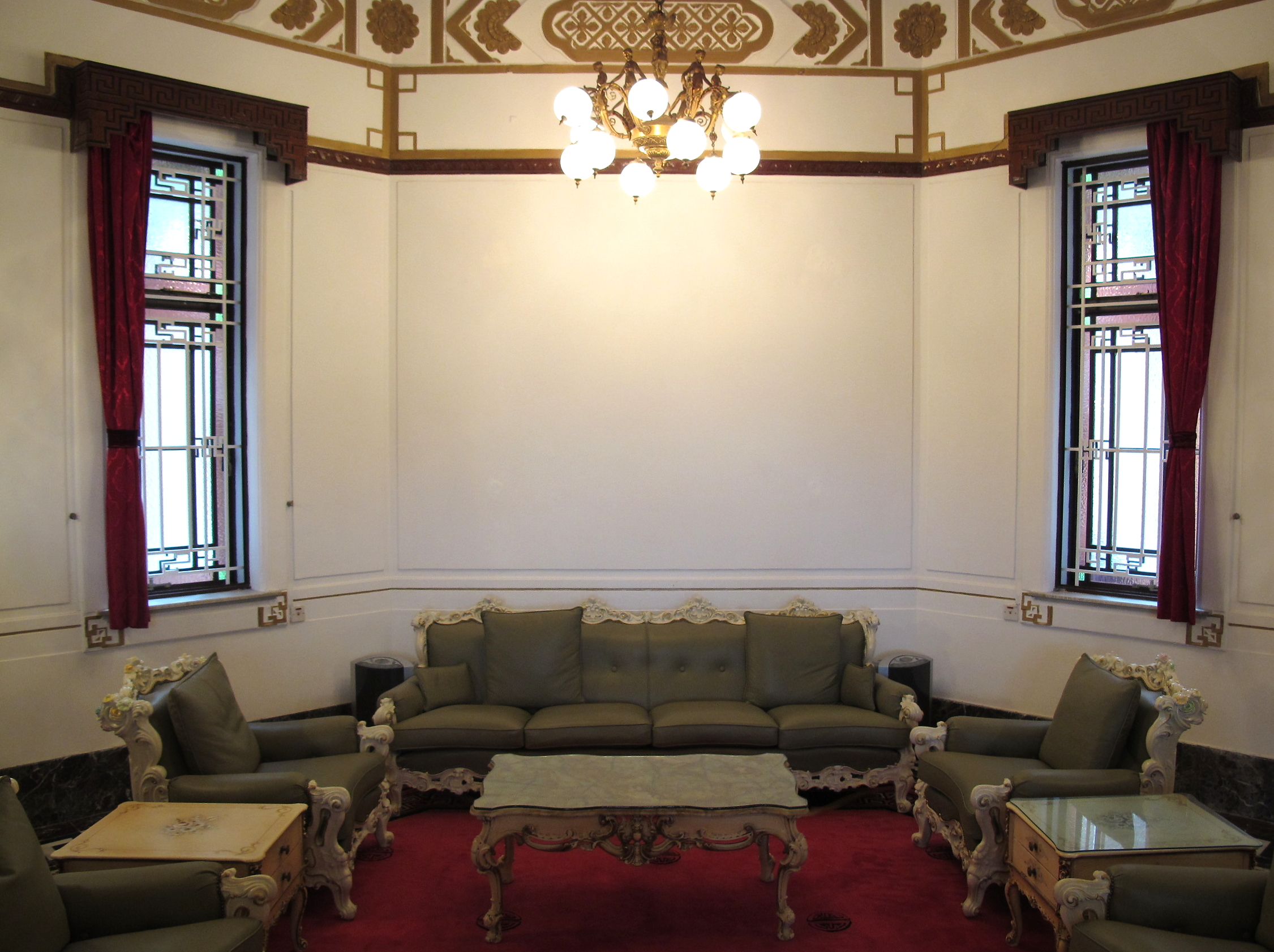
Main Hall

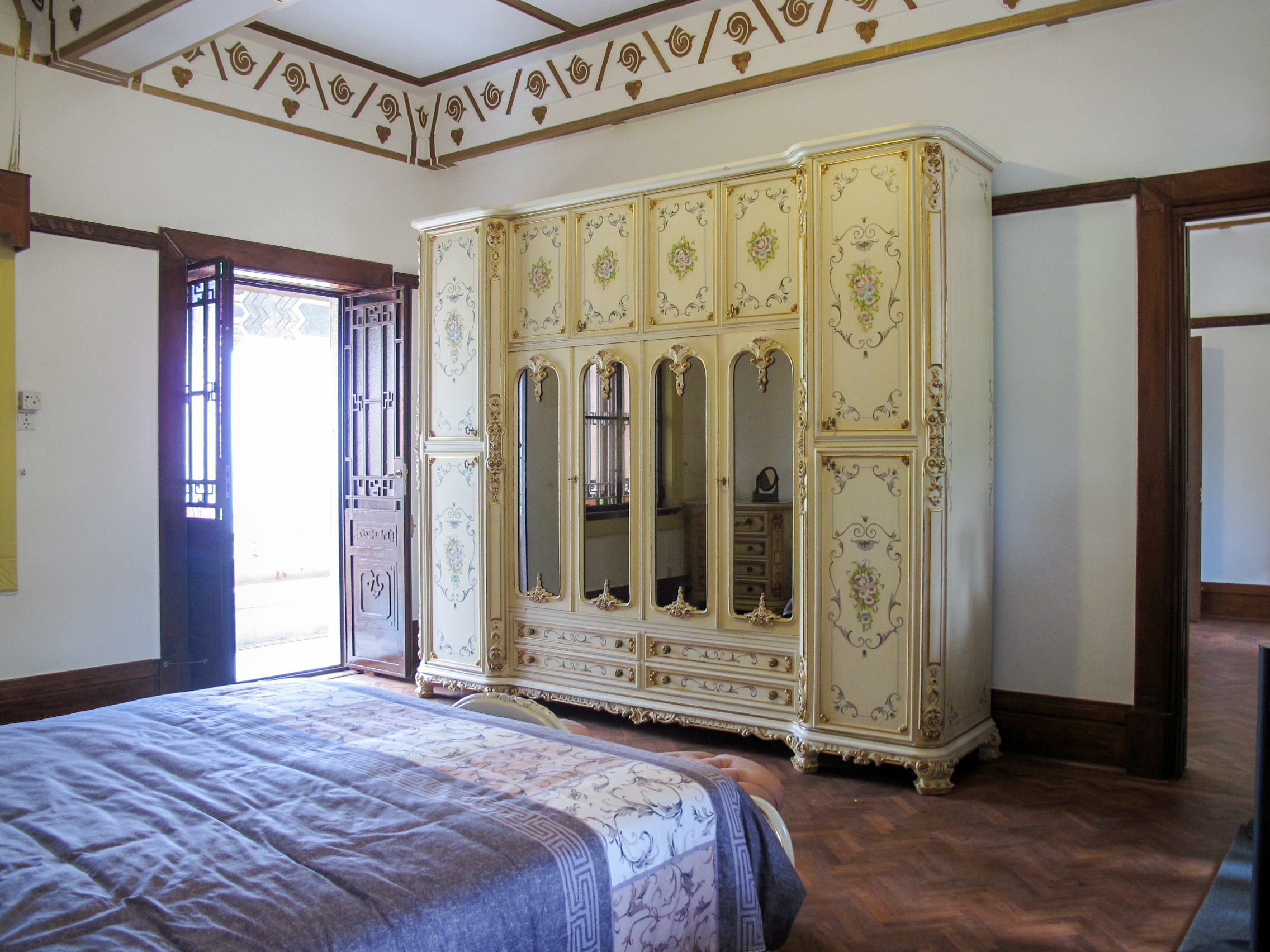
Bedroom with furniture (2013)

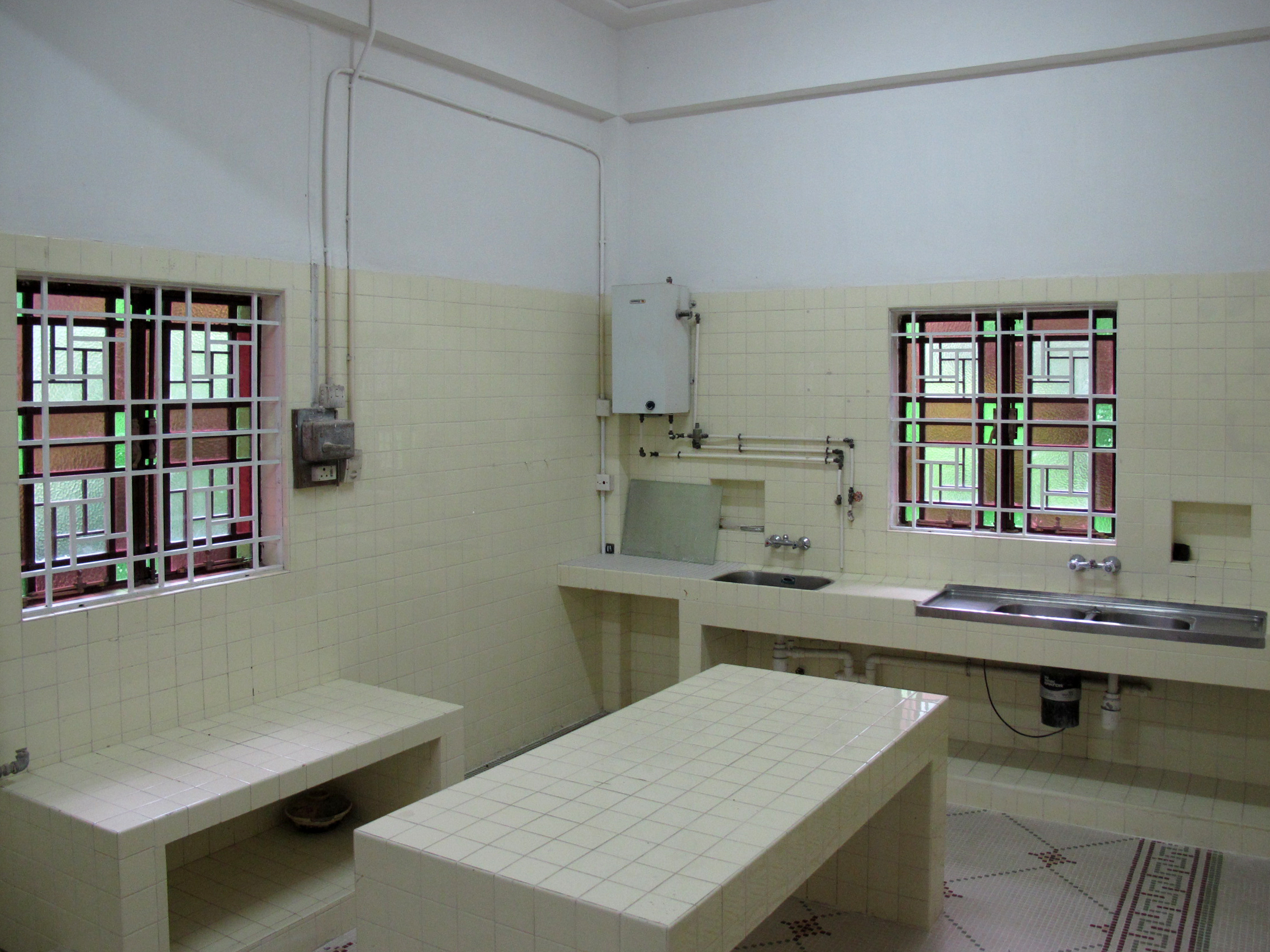
Kitchen

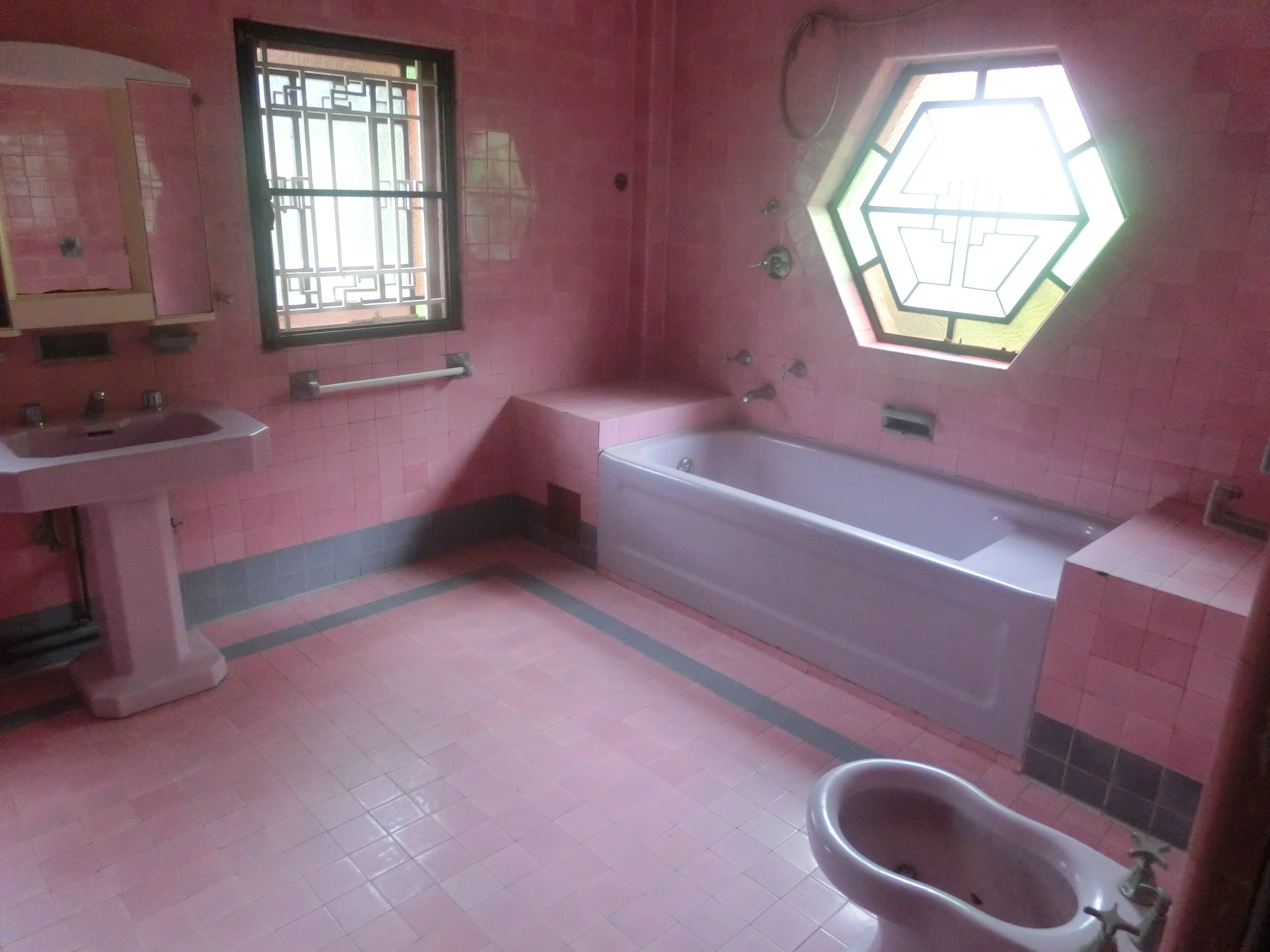
Pink tiled bathroom (2013)

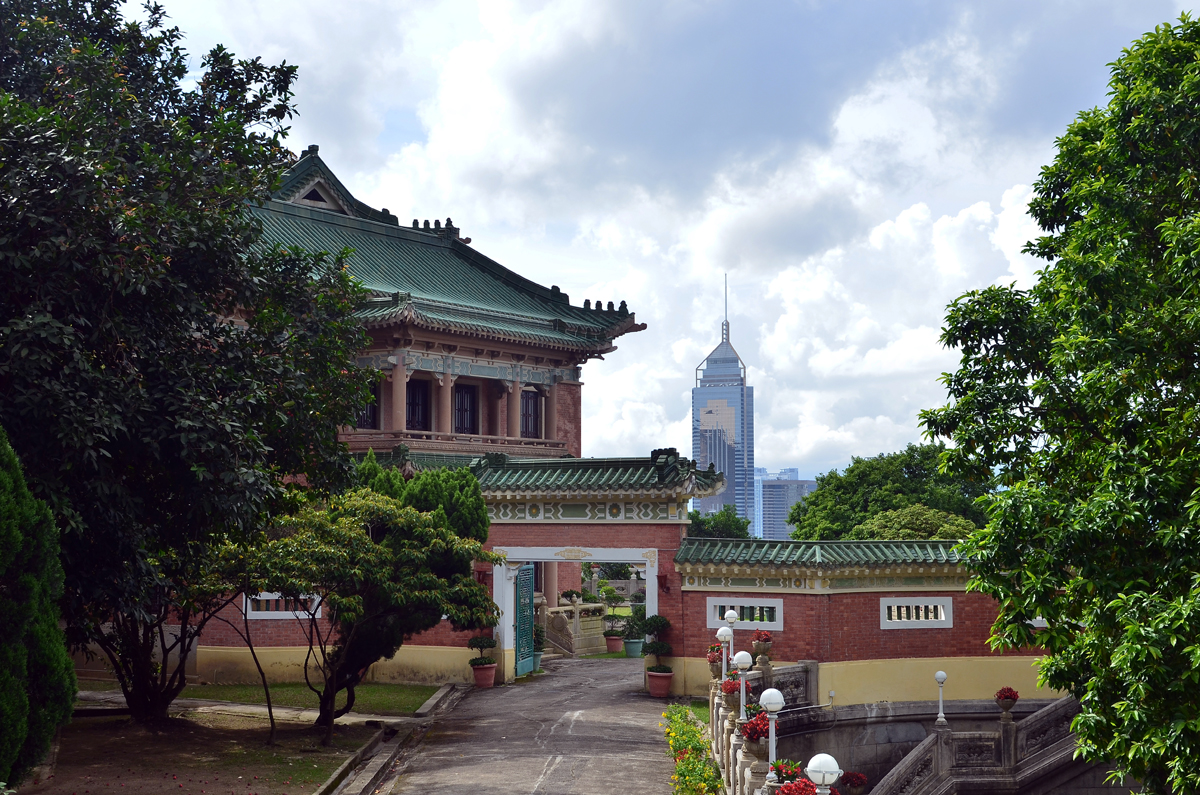
King Yin Lei silhouette (2013)
