= District Council District Minor Works =

District Minor Works Programme
- 地區小型工程計劃
- Abbreviation: DMW
- Formation: 2007
- Legal status: Active
- Purpose: Funding for public works
- Location: Hong Kong
- Parent organisation: Home Affairs Department; Leisure and Cultural Services Department
- Website: Official website

District Council District Minor Works
- Traditional Chinese: 地區小型工程計劃
Transcriptions
Yue: Cantonese
- Yale Romanization: Deih kēui síu yìhng gūng chìhng gai waahk
- Jyutping: Dei6 keoi1 siu2 ying4 gung1 ching4 gai3 waak6

The District Minor Works (DMW, Chinese: 地區小型工程計劃) programme of Hong Kong was initiated in 2007 and has been fully implemented since January 2008. It aims to fund minor works projects to improve local facilities, living environment and hygienic conditions through 18 district councils.

It covers minor building works, fitting out works and minor alterations, additions and improvement works including furniture and equipment replacement and slope inspections. Up to December 2015, about 4600 DMW facilities had been completed.

== History ==
=== Lead departments ===
The Home Affairs Department (HAD) and the Leisure and Cultural Services Department (LCSD) are the two lead departments in this programme. The HAD is responsible for minor work projects related to community halls and improvements to living environment and hygienic conditions; the LCSD is responsible for projects related to leisure, cultural, sports, soft landscaping and recreation facilities. The DMW programme involved cooperation with the Architectural Services Department (Archsd), Electrical and Mechanical Services Department and term consultants.

=== District councils ===
The role of district councils (DCs) in the DMW programme includes:

- initiating projects and collating local views
- deciding project scale and scope
- endorsing projects proposed by government departments
- determining implementation priority and timetable
- monitoring progress

The HAD has proposed to the DCs the appointment of a member or a dedicated working group for each DMW project to follow up on its planning, such as conducting site inspections in order to enhance communication. The HAD has also proposed that DCs should consider endorsing projects by way of circulation of papers instead of waiting for deliberation at the bimonthly meeting of the relevant District Council Committee. District Offices are assumed to hold a more proactive role in following up the progress of the projects.

=== Term consultancy approach ===
The key steps involved are:

- District councils members identify a project and prepare project statements.
- DCs prioritise projects.
- Consultants conduct preliminary feasibility studies, cost estimation and preliminary designs.
- Lead departments work out arrangements.
- Consultants revise project designs and cost estimations upon the DC's advice.
- DCs endorse project designs and cost estimations.
- Consultants prepare tender documents.
- Lead departments invite, receive and open tender.
- Lead departments sign contract with tender.
- Consultants supervise construction and administer contracts.
- Lead departments pay consultants, site supervision staff and contractors.
- ASD / HAD verify maintenance requirement.

=== Project details ===
The DMW covers nine main types of projects:

- Sitting-out areas and playgrounds
- Gardens and pet gardens
- Landmarks
- Pavilions and arbours
- Rain shelters
- Covered walkways and access
- Ball courts
- Planters
- Miscellaneous, including benches, tour signage, tourist guide maps, fences and fitness equipment

== Consultation ==
The 18 district councils take the initiative to discuss project ideas and consult the relevant stakeholders. The DCs play a pivotal role and are actively engaged in the consultation of District Minor Works projects, from the initial feasibility studies to designs and planning. Besides, at the planning stages, several stakeholders including the Area Committees (which are for urban areas), Rural Committees (for rural areas) and residents' organizations, for instance, the Mutual Aid Committees or Owners Corporations are also consulted on a need basis concerning the proposed projects. Priority is placed in meeting the expectations and needs of the local communities.

Projects under the DMW programme are endorsed by the 18 DCs, who are responsible for collating local views and district aspirations in planning and scheduling minor works. DC members consider views from locals before putting up proposals to their DCs for consideration and endorsement. DCs then consider whether the proposed projects fall within the ambit of the programme with regards to the scope of works, benefits to the public, project estimates and timetable for implementation, etc.

However, whether the DCs have conducted sufficient consultations is not held accountable. For example, the construction of Cadogan Street Temporary Garden in Kennedy Town was accused of having been pushed through without proper consultation by a concern group set up by the local residents. It was pointed out that the construction accounted for 30% of the district's minor works expenditure for the whole district, which is the highest budgeted plan. However, it will be demolished after several years. Furthermore, not all relevant stakeholders are taken into account, such as the elderly. There are needs for more social facilities such as clinics, schools and elderly care homes in that district instead of a temporary garden. Consultation may not be adequate for minor works that will be carried out.

Furthermore, transparency of the consultation cannot be guaranteed. Seven district councillors were found to have multiple identities, simultaneously holding the posts of rural committee chairmen. Meanwhile, all these chairmen were also members of the Steering Committee, who hold the final approval of the minor works. This implies that minor works, from being proposed to adopted, are handled by the same group of people, who play different roles in different stages. They can advocate, be consulted and have the power of scrutiny and approval. This shows that the minor works may just benefit the needs of a small group of people. Worse still, there may be black operation.

== Finance ==
Since the implementation of the DMW in 2008, the annual provision of the DMW is $300 million. In the financial years of 2012-13 and 2013–14, it was increased to $320 million and $340 million respectively. Up to December 2015, the total expenditure was over $2.2 billion.

The cost of each project under the DMW programme would not exceed $30 million.

The actual project expenditures with breakdown by district and year of completion are given below:

District	Actual expenditure (in $ million)					
District	2009	2010	2011	2013	2014	2015
Central & Western	9.1	10.7	10.7	10.3	11.0	11.7
Eastern	13.2	15.6	15.6	15.9	14.8	16.4
Kowloon City	11.8	13.9	13.9	13.6	12.2	22.7
Kwun Tong	15.7	18.6	18.6	23.7	17.6	26.2
Southern	10.6	12.5	12.5	8.9	10.3	14.3
Sham Shui Po	14.6	17.2	17.2	9.7	15.5	20.0
Wan Chai	8.3	9.8	9.8	8.4	8.8	15.6
Wong Tai Sin	14.4	17.1	17.1	7.4	15.2	16.2
Yau Tsim Mong	12.2	14.4	14.4	11.3	10.0	12.6
Islands	14.4	17.0	17.0	13.7	17.2	20.5
Kwai Tsing	15.5	18.3	18.3	22.5	19.7	25.2
North	15.3	18.1	18.1	21.0	26.5	34.1
Sai Kung	14.9	17.7	17.7	19.7	24.3	20.6
Sha Tin	15.7	18.6	18.6	19.1	25.6	27.1
Tuen Mun	16.3	19.2	19.2	20.1	29.6	27.2
Tai Po	14.9	17.6	17.6	16.8	27.4	25.5
Tsuen Wan	11.8	14.0	14.0	10.9	20.9	17.7
Yuen Long	19.5	23.1	23.1	33.1	27.7	44.4
Total	248.2	293.5	293.5	286.1	334.3	398

For the first year of DMW implemented in 2008-09, 626 projects were completed. According to the information from the Home Affairs Bureau, up to 4962 projects were completed in total on 2015-16.

The number of DMW projects with the breakdown by district and year of completion is given below:

District	Number of projects completed							
District	2008-09	2009-10	2010-11	2011-12	2012-13	2013-14	2014-15	2015-16
Central & Western	49	72	70	40	30	7	28	61
Eastern	41	42	30	36	28	33	26	46
Kowloon City	43	53	65	62	37	29	30	32
Kwun Tong	40	90	46	50	29	49	46	57
Southern	60	69	78	56	44	10	35	36
Sham Shui Po	83	83	73	42	48	18	64	55
Wan Chai	35	21	23	15	9	7	9	14
Wong Tai Sin	21	30	25	18	5	4	3	21
Yau Tsim Mong	29	29	46	30	21	11	18	62
Islands	35	30	54	41	34	21	40	56
Kwai Tsing	41	42	50	37	26	29	29	43
North	32	27	30	18	13	15	30	29
Sai Kung	18	25	30	32	14	12	21	31
Sha Tin	28	58	35	45	36	31	23	76
Tuen Mun	15	38	24	22	24	8	19	19
Tai Po	16	25	30	13	9	15	20	29
Tsuen Wan	36	54	42	45	19	41	39	68
Yuen Long	4	15	24	42	27	30	25	42
Total	626	803	775	644	453	373	508	780

At the time of the launch of the DMW programme, the dedicated block allocation covering the capital costs was $300 million. The annual provision for the DMW block vote was increased by $20 million in 2012-13 and by another $20 million in 2013-14. The current annual provision is $340 million. In addition, resources have been set aside to cover the recurrent costs for the management and maintenance of completed facilities. The allocation for the DMW Programme will be increased progressively to $400 million, both capital and recurrent costs inclusive. Specifically, the recurrent costs will increase from $33 million in 2015-16 to $60 million in 2019-20. As a result, the total annual allocation for the DMW programme will amount to $400 million in 2019-20.

Currently, there are a total of 199 professional and works grade staff in HAD headquarters and its district offices supporting the implementation of various minor works programmes, including the DMW programme. This has included some 30 additional posts comprising five professional and 25 works grade staff since 2008. In 2016-17, the government plans to create two new posts of one professional and one works grade staff, so as to further strengthen the support for the implementation of minor works programmes.

== Controversies ==
=== Lack of practical use ===
In 2010 in Southern District, a shelter was built over a bus stop in Wah Kwai Estate for 2.4 million, but then was discovered it was unable to provide shelter from rain and sunlight due to an open hole in the design. It was then reconstructed so as to fulfill its purpose.

In Yuen Long District a football field was constructed in San Tin for 14.5 million. Since it opened for use in 2010, the usage rata has been low. The transport network is inconvenient for public, being a walking distance of 20 minutes from public transport. There are no public toilets nor changing rooms at the football field. Toilets can only be reached in a walking distance of ten minutes.

Also in Yuen Long District, a man-made beach volleyball court was constructed in Tin Shui Wai for 19 million. District councillors criticised it as being impractical because beach volleyball is an unpopular sport and the maintenance of the court is costly.

In Kwai Tsing District, an electronic display board was installed in a mini-bus stop, showing time and temperature for public reference, and also road safety warnings for drivers. Some citizen criticised they could not read the display board because of the reflection of light.

In Yau Tsim Mong District, a red bronze statue was proposed to be built, with construction commencing by February 2014. An online petition was signed to oppose the construction, criticising it as a waste of public money of 1.59 million. The then Wan Chai District Council President Ada Wong Ying-kay criticised the construction of impractical facilities as falling behind public demand.

In Yau Tsim Mong District, the building of four shelters near the Coronation was completed in February 2016 for 1.58 million. Civic Party District Councillor Yu Tak Po criticised the size of shelters as being too small to accommodate more than two people.

=== Unnecessary spending ===
In Kwun Tong District, a budget proposal for repainting of 10 wall paintings for 0.8 million was approved in September 2016. Some of the wall paintings were painted in 1983. In 2010, 0.6 million was spent on organising a wall painting competition for the repainting work. According to Chairman of Kwun Tong District Facilities Management Committee Tam Siu-cheuk, the original design will remain after the repainting. The budget was reasonable in terms of the cost of weeding, cleaning and maintenance. Also, according to Kwun Tong District Councillor Wong Tsz Kin, the alternative of redesigning is not likely because the removal of the existing wall painting is technically difficult. Home Affairs Department replied the wall paintings will make the environment more pleasant and raise hygienic awareness.

However, the opposition thinks that the wall paintings are not effective in educating the public or raising hygienic awareness. There has been no significant improvement in hygiene in Sau Mau Ping. The design and slogans of the wall paintings are outdated, so the best solution is not to repaint but redesign them.

=== Unfair selection process ===
The approval of proposed projects is internally conducted, which means a proposed project is rated and assessed by the district councillors of the same district. This internal selection process is criticised as being biased and interest-conflicted since district councillors of the same political parties may tend to rate their party members higher. In 2016, 10 of the 13 successfully proposed projects in the Tsuen Wan District were proposed by DAB, cost amounting to 1.6 million.

=== Destruction of natural environment ===
Some construction in the country park areas is criticised as an intrusion of natural environment. In 2010, a construction project on fences and facilities was proposed by Sha Tin District Council Chairman Ho Hau-cheung. In 2014, a renovation of fences are approved in Sha Tin District Council for 0.12 million. In Tsuen Wan District, the refurbishment of pathways in Yuen Tsuen Ancient Trail from Sheung Tong to Ha Fa Shan was proposed so as to facilitate villagers. In Yuen Long District, a resurfacing was proposed for the rugged and destroyed pathway near Kam Tin Town Sei Pai Shek Tsuen Tsing Long Highway.

The Home Affairs Department said that all refurbishment project of rural pathways proposed and approved in district councils or the committees underneath them will strictly abide by the use of environmental friendly materials. For example, pathways will be surfaced with irregular natural rocks and cement to fit with the natural environment. Also, to meet the daily needs of villagers, for example, the use of wheelchairs or trolleys for the movement of large objects, concrete will be used for pathway construction for their ease.

The Agriculture, Fisheries and Conservation Department said that the resurfacing of pathways and staircases with the use of cement amounts to 1.4 km, while the use of sand, soil and gravel reaches 100 km. The department will use natural material in the construction as much as possible, with three basic principles: simplicity of design, minimal impact on the natural environment and the safety of the public. Only when soil erosion becomes too serious or the pathway become too rugged will cement be used for fixing.

Environmentalists oppose the use of cement, because it affects the natural environment and destroys the natural view. An online survey showed that 90 percent of the 6,000 respondents preferred natural pathway to cemented ones. The President of Convoy Global Holdings Limited, Quincy Wong, criticised it as a white elephant.
