= Kam Ying (constituency) =

Hong Kong constituency

- Elected constituency for the Sha Tin District Council
- Boundary of Kam Ying in Sha Tin District
- District: Sha Tin
- Legislative Council constituency: New Territories South East
- Population: 16,942 (2019)
- Electorate: 11,639 (2019)

Current constituency
- Created: 1994
- Number of members: One
- Member: Vacant

Kam Ying is one of the 41 constituencies in the Sha Tin District in Hong Kong. The constituency returns one district councillor to the Sha Tin District Council, with an election every four years.

The Kam Ying constituency is loosely based on Kam Ying Court, Park Belvedere and part of Sunshine City in Ma On Shan, with an estimated population of 16,942.

== Councillors represented ==
Election	Member	Party
1994	Wong Kwok-hung	Nonpartisan→Frontier
1999	Wong Kwok-hung	Frontier→Nonpartisan
2003	Wong Kwok-hung	Nonpartisan
2007 by-election	Tong Po-chun	Nonpartisan
2007	Tong Po-chun	Nonpartisan
2011	Tong Po-chun	Nonpartisan→BPA
2015	Ting Tsz-yuen	Democratic→Community Sha Tin
2019	Ting Tsz-yuen→Vacant (Note: Resigned on 31 May 2021 over new oath-taking laws.)	Community Sha Tin

== Election results ==
=== 2010s ===
Sha Tin District Council Election, 2019: Kam Ying
Party	Candidate	Votes	%	±%
Community Sha Tin	Ting Tsz-yuen	4,775	53.46	+21.96
DAB	Choi Wai-shing	3,401	46.54	
Independent	Lee Kin-hang	530	5.93	
Nonpartisan	Law Siu-chung	226	2.53	
Majority		1,374	6.92	
Turnout		8,954	76.95	
Community Sha Tin hold		Swing		

Sha Tin District Council Election, 2015: Kam Ying
Party	Candidate	Votes	%	±%
Democratic	Ting Tsz-yuen	1,612	31.50	
Independent (BPA)	Tong Po-chun	1,442	28.18	−47.96
Nonpartisan	Law Siu-chun	1,176	22.98	
Nonpartisan	Li Po-mui	888	17.35	
Majority		170	3.32	
Turnout		5,118	48.59	
Democratic gain from Independent		Swing		

Sha Tin District Council Election, 2011: Kam Ying
Party	Candidate	Votes	%	±%
Nonpartisan	Tong Po-chun	3,134	76.14	+17.44
Nonpartisan	Wong Kwok-hung	982	23.86	
Majority		2,125	52.28	
Turnout		4,116	41.54	
Nonpartisan hold		Swing		

=== 2000s ===
Sha Tin District Council Election, 2007: Kam Ying
Party	Candidate	Votes	%	±%
Nonpartisan	Tong Po-chun	2,163	58.70	+8.15
Frontier	Wong Huk-kam	1,522	41.30	+18.55
Majority		641	7.40	
Nonpartisan hold		Swing		

Kam Ying by-election 2007
Party	Candidate	Votes	%	±%
Nonpartisan	Tong Po-chun	1,704	50.55	
Frontier	Wong Huk-kam	767	22.75	−55.40
Democratic	Chan Ming-hung	557	16.52	
Liberal	Wong Shun-loy	343	10.18	
Majority		937	27.80	
Nonpartisan gain from Nonpartisan		Swing		

Sha Tin District Council Election, 2003: Kam Ying
Party	Candidate	Votes	%	±%
Nonpartisan	Wong Kwok-hung	3,441	78.15	+27.81
DAB	Tsang Hin-wai	962	21.85	−27.81
Majority		2,497	56.30	
Nonpartisan hold		Swing	+27.81	

=== 1990s ===
Sha Tin District Council Election, 1999: Kam Ying
Party	Candidate	Votes	%	±%
Frontier	Wong Kwok-hung	1,392	50.34	−1.83
DAB	Tung Wai-ming	1,373	49.66	
Majority		19	0.68	
Frontier hold		Swing		

Sha Tin District Board Election, 1994: Kam Ying
Party	Candidate	Votes	%	±%
Nonpartisan	Wong Kwok-hung	1,345	52.17	
Nonpartisan	Chan Chok-dim	1,233	47.83	
Majority		112	4.34	
Nonpartisan win (new seat)				
