= Wong Uk (constituency) =

Hong Kong constituency

- Elected constituency for the Sha Tin District Council
- Boundary of Wong Uk in Sha Tin District
- District: Sha Tin
- Legislative Council constituency: New Territories North East
- Population: 17,502 (2019)
- Electorate: 8,742 (2019)

Current constituency
- Created: 1991
- Number of members: One
- Member: Vacant

Wong Uk is one of the 41 constituencies in the Sha Tin District in Hong Kong.

The constituency returns one district councillor to the Sha Tin District Council, with an election every four years.

The Wong Uk constituency is loosely based on Wong Uk Village, Belair Gardens and Prince of Wales Hospital in Yuen Chau Kok, Sha Tin, with an estimated population of 17,502.

== Councillors represented ==
Election	Member	Party
1991	George Wong Fuk-wah	Meeting Point→Democratic
1994	Wong Yiu-sang	Democratic
1999	Leung Chi-wai	Liberal
2003	Leung Chi-wai	Liberal
2007	Leung Chi-wai	Liberal
2011	Leung Chi-wai	Liberal
2015	Lai Tsz-yan→Vacant	Independent
2019	Lai Tsz-yan→Vacant	Community Sha Tin→Independent

== Election results ==
=== 2010s ===
Sha Tin District Council Election, 2019: Wong Uk
Party	Candidate	Votes	%	±%
Community Sha Tin	Lai Tsz-yan	4,440	66.72	+14.52
Nonpartisan	Leung Chi-wai	2,215	33.28	−14.52
Majority		2,225	33.44	
Turnout		6,700	76.64	
Community Sha Tin hold		Swing		

Sha Tin District Council Election, 2015: Wong Uk
Party	Candidate	Votes	%	±%
Independent	Lai Tsz-yan	2,111	52.2	
Liberal	Leung Chi-wai	1,936	47.8	
Majority		175	4.4	
Turnout		4,048	49.7	
Independent gain from Liberal		Swing		

Sha Tin District Council Election, 2011: Wong Uk
Party	Candidate	Votes	%	±%
Liberal	Leung Chi-wai	uncontested		
Liberal hold		Swing		

=== 2000s ===
Sha Tin District Council Election, 2007: Wong Uk
Party	Candidate	Votes	%	±%
Liberal	Leung Chi-wai	1,472	44.3	−14.8
Independent	Cheung Tak-ming	995	30.0	−10.9
Democratic	Chow Wai-tung	854	25.7	
Majority		477	14.3	+6.1
Liberal hold		Swing		

Sha Tin District Council Election, 2003: Wong Uk
Party	Candidate	Votes	%	±%
Liberal	Leung Chi-wai	1,956	59.1	+8.0
Civil Force	Cheung Tak-ming	1,352	40.9	−8.0
Majority		604	8.2	+7.0
Liberal hold		Swing	+8.0	

=== 1990s ===
Sha Tin District Council Election, 1999: Wong Uk
Party	Candidate	Votes	%	±%
Liberal	Leung Chi-wai	1,256	51.1	
Civil Force	Cheung Tak-ming	1,200	48.9	
Majority		56	1.2	+0.8
Liberal gain from Democratic		Swing		

Sha Tin District Board Election, 1994: Wong Uk
Party	Candidate	Votes	%	±%
Democratic	Wong Yiu-sang	1,302	50.2	−3.2
Liberal	Leung Chi-wai	1,291	49.8	
Majority		11	0.4	−16.8
Democratic hold		Swing		

Sha Tin District Board Election, 1991: Wong Uk
Party	Candidate	Votes	%	±%
Meeting Point	George Wong Fuk-wah	845	53.4	
United Democrats	Joe Wong Tak-chuen	573	36.2	
Independent	Chan Chun-kwan	163	10.3	
Majority		272	17.2	
Meeting Point win (new seat)				
