= Community Sha Tin =

Community Sha Tin 沙田區政
- Convenor: Ting Tsz-yuen
- Founded: 14 December 2017
- Dissolved: 25 June 2021
- Ideology: Liberalism (Hong Kong); Sha Tin regionalism
- Political position: Big tent
- Regional affiliation: Pro-democracy camp
- Colours: Turquoise

Website
- Official Facebook page

Community Sha Tin
- Traditional Chinese: 沙田區政
Transcriptions
Yue: Cantonese
- Yale Romanization: sā tìhn kēui jing
- Jyutping: Saa1 tin4 koei1 zing3

Community Sha Tin was a local political group based in Sha Tin formed in 2017 by a group of pro-democracy Sha Tin District Councillors. It was disbanded in 2021 following the change of political atmosphere in Hong Kong.

== History ==
The group was formed on 14 December 2017 by nine members of the Sha Tin District Council, including former Neo Democrats councillors Yau Man-chun, Billy Chan Shiu-yeung, Chiu Chu-pong and Hui Yui-yu, former Democratic Party's Chan Nok-hang and Ting Tsz-yuen, Labour Party's Yip Wing and two post-Occupy "umbrella soldiers" Lai Tsz-yan and Wong Hok-lai, to consolidate the pro-democratic force in the council.

Amid the intra-party conflicts between Democratic Party Legislative Councillor Lam Cheuk-ting and the members who were both members of the party's New Territories East branch members and Concern Group for Tseung Kwan O People's Livelihood (CGPLTKO), Ting Tsz-yuen, Community Sha Tin's convenor also quit the Democratic Party over the dual-membership allegation.

Community Sha Tin had many candidates overlapping with Democratic Party's candidates in the 2019 District Council elections, including the newly created Di Yee, where Tse Kit-wing and Democratic Party's Liu Qing contested in the same constituency. Due to the clashes, some candidates of the group were not endorsed by Power for Democracy.

Community Sha Tin announced immediate dissolution at Facebook on 25 June 2021. Former vice-counvenor Chiu Chu-pong said it is a tough decision after considering the current political atmosphere. Chiu also mentioned the limitations of achieving community work under the party brand, and hence decided to dissolve the party.

== Performance in elections ==
=== Sha Tin District Council elections ===
Election	Number of popular votes	% of popular votes	Total elected seats	+/−
2019	25,509	8.32	5 / 41	1▲

== Representatives ==
=== District Councils ===
The Community Sha Tin held ten seats in Sha Tin District Council (2020–2023) at dissolution:

District	Constituency	Member
Sha Tin	Yue Shing	William Shek
Sha Tin	Wong Uk	Lai Tsz-yan
Sha Tin	Pok Hong	Chiu Chu-pong
Sha Tin	Shui Chuen O	Lo Tak-ming
Sha Tin	Chun Fung	Chan Nok-hang
Sha Tin	Lower Shing Mun	Ken Wong Ho-fung
Sha Tin	Keng Hau	Ng Kam-hung
Sha Tin	Tin Sum	Tsang Kit
Sha Tin	Chung Tin	Wong Hok-lai
Sha Tin	Wu Kai Sha	Li Wing-shing
