= Chung Tin (constituency) =

Constituency in the Sha Tin District, Hong Kong

- Elected constituency for the Sha Tin District Council
- Boundary of Chung Tin in Sha Tin District
- District: Sha Tin
- Legislative Council constituency: New Territories North East
- Population: 15,131 (2019)
- Electorate: 9,568 (2019)

Current constituency
- Created: 2003
- Number of members: One
- Member: Vacant

Chung Tin is one of the 41 constituencies in the Sha Tin District in Hong Kong.

The constituency returns one district councillor to the Sha Tin District Council, with an election every four years.

Previously called Chung Shing, the current Chung Tin constituency is loosely based on Mei Chung Court, Peak One, Granville Garden, Heung Fan Liu New Village and part of Mei Tin Estate, with an estimated population of 15,131.

== Councillors represented ==
Election	Member	Party
2003	Tang Wing-cheong	Civil Force
2014	Tang Wing-cheong	NPP/CF
2015	Wong Hok-lai→Vacant	STCN

== Election results ==
=== 2010s ===
Sha Tin District Council Election, 2019: Chung Tin
Party	Candidate	Votes	%	±%
Community Sha Tin	Wong Hok-lai	4,313	60.51	+14.71
DAB	Yiu Ho-yee	2,815	39.49	
Majority		1,498	21.02	+10.80
Turnout		7,153	74.76	
Community Sha Tin hold		Swing		

Sha Tin District Council Election, 2015: Chung Tin
Party	Candidate	Votes	%	±%
Sha Tin Community Network	Wong Hok-lai	1,631	45.8	
NPP (Civil Force)	Tang Wing-cheong	1,268	35.6	−25.1
Independent	Lo Yuet-chau	662	18.6	
Majority		363	10.2	−10.2
Turnout		3,561	45.0	+27.2
Sha Tin Community Network gain from NPP		Swing		

Sha Tin District Council Election, 2011: Chung Tin
Party	Candidate	Votes	%	±%
Civil Force	Tang Wing-cheong	1,636	60.7	−1.1
Independent	Lee Yuen-kam	1,058	39.3	
Majority		578	20.4	−12.8
Turnout		2,694	28.8	
Civil Force hold		Swing		

=== 2000s ===
Sha Tin District Council Election, 2007: Chung Tin
Party	Candidate	Votes	%	±%
Civil Force	Tang Wing-cheong	1,646	61.6	
Civic	Tsang Kin-chiu	1,028	38.4	
Majority		618	33.2	
Civil Force hold		Swing		

Sha Tin District Council Election, 2003: Chung Shing
Party	Candidate	Votes	%	±%
Civil Force	Tang Wing-cheong	Unopposed		
Civil Force hold		Swing		
