= Pok Hong (constituency) =

Hong Kong constituency

- Elected constituency for the Sha Tin District Council
- Boundary of Pok Hong in Sha Tin District
- District: Sha Tin
- Legislative Council constituency: New Territories North East
- Population: 16,063 (2019)
- Electorate: 12,710 (2019)

Current constituency
- Created: 1994
- Number of members: One
- Member: Vacant

Pok Hong is one of the 41 constituencies in the Sha Tin District in Hong Kong.

The constituency returns one district councillor to the Sha Tin District Council, with an election every four years.

The Pok Hong constituency is loosely based on Pok Hong Estate, with an estimated population of 16,063.

== Councillors represented ==
Election	Member	Party
1994	Chan Kwok-tim	Civil Force
1999	Chan Kwok-tim	Civil Force
2003	Chan Kwok-tim	Civil Force
2007	Chan Kwok-tim	Civil Force
2011	Chan Kwok-tim	Civil Force→NPP/CF
2015	Chiu Chu-pong→Vacant	Neo Democrats→Independent→Community Sha Tin
2019	Chiu Chu-pong→Vacant	Community Sha Tin

== Election results ==
=== 2010s ===
Sha Tin District Council Election, 2019: Pok Hong
Party	Candidate	Votes	%	±%
Community Sha Tin	Chiu Chu-pong	6,421	73.61	+21.81
Independent	Guo Xuantong	2,302	26.39	
Majority		4,119	45.22	
Turnout		8,759	68.95	
Community Sha Tin hold		Swing		

Sha Tin District Council Election, 2015: Pok Hong
Party	Candidate	Votes	%	±%
Neo Democrats	Chiu Chu-pong	2,859	51.8	
NPP (Civil Force)	Chan Kwok-tim	2,666	48.3	−16.6
Majority		193	3.5	−26.3
Turnout		5,525	47.7	+11.6
Neo Democrats gain from NPP		Swing		

Sha Tin District Council Election, 2011: Pok Hong
Party	Candidate	Votes	%	±%
Civil Force	Chan Kwok-tim	2,781	64.9	−4.8
Democratic	Pang Siu-ying	1,504	35.1	+11.9
Majority		1,581	29.8	−12.6
Turnout		4,285	36.1	
Civil Force hold		Swing	−8.4	

=== 2000s ===
Sha Tin District Council Election, 2007: Pok Hong
Party	Candidate	Votes	%	±%
Civil Force	Chan Kwok-tim	3,156	69.6	
Frontier	Pang Siu-ying	1,053	23.2	
Independent	Cheung Chi-tung	326	7.2	
Majority		2,103	42.4	
Civil Force hold		Swing		

Sha Tin District Council Election, 2003: Pok Hong
Party	Candidate	Votes	%	±%
Civil Force	Chan Kwok-tim	uncontested		
Civil Force hold		Swing		

=== 1990s ===
Sha Tin District Council Election, 1999: Pok Hong
Party	Candidate	Votes	%	±%
Civil Force	Chan Kwok-tim	3,794	79.7	+28.0
Independent	Ho Suk-yee	967	20.3	
Majority		2,827	59.4	+56.0
Civil Force hold		Swing		

Sha Tin District Board Election, 1994: Pok Hong
Party	Candidate	Votes	%	±%
Civil Force	Chan Kwok-tim	1,986	51.7	
Independent	Kwok Wai-leung	1,852	48.3	
Majority		134	3.4	
Civil Force win (new seat)				
