= Revitalising Historic Buildings Through Partnership Scheme =

- Traditional Chinese: 活化歷史建築夥伴計劃
- Simplified Chinese: 活化历史建筑夥伴计划
Transcriptions
Standard Mandarin
- Hanyu Pinyin: Huóhuà Lìshǐ Jiànzhù Huǒbàn Jìhuà
Yue: Cantonese
- Jyutping: wut6 faa3 lik6 si2 gin3 zuk1 fo2 bun6 gai3 waak6

The Revitalising Historic Buildings through Partnership Scheme (Chinese: 活化歷史建築夥伴計劃) is an initiative launched by the Hong Kong Government, part of a broader policy of heritage conservation in Hong Kong. In order to preserve and put historic buildings into good use and promote public participation in conserving historic buildings, the Hong Kong Government has chosen Government-owned buildings for adaptive reuse under the Scheme.

As of 2018, 8 properties have been opened in their new functions and 11 additional properties have been allotted for renovation. New uses include a museum, a marketplace, a 'creative arts psychological therapy centre', a facility to train guide dogs for the blind, and a leadership training centre with hostel.

== Scope ==
Eligible applicants are non-profit-making organisations with charitable status under Section 88 of the Inland Revenue Ordinance (Cap 112) and joint ventures of two or more non-profit-making organisations. Participation requirements are broad, with equal weight promised to organisations regardless of size, age, or 'local experience in heritage conservation'.

Applicants submit proposals for using these buildings to provide services or business in the form of social enterprise. Submissions include detailed plans to show how:

- the historic buildings would be preserved
- their historical significance would be brought out effectively
- the social enterprise would operate in terms of financial viability
- the local community would benefit, especially in terms of jobs and cultural landmarks.

Funding can be entirely independent, or government funding support may be available. Government funding may come in the form of a grant for renovation, reduced rental fees, or a grant to assist with start-up costs and early operating costs.

The Advisory Committee on Built Heritage Conservation (ACBHC) – composed of experts in development and conservation – then assesses the proposals. After two rounds of assessment, the ACBHC chooses the bidding winner.

== Revitalisation work ==
=== Batch I ===
Batch I of the Scheme started in February 2008. Batch I of the Scheme included seven buildings:

- Fong Yuen Study Hall in Ma Wan – built in 1920–1930, not yet graded (now Grade III)
- Lai Chi Kok Hospital in Lai Chi Kok – built in 1921–1924, Grade III historic building
- Lui Seng Chun in Mong Kok – built in 1931, Grade I historic building
- Mei Ho House in Sham Shui Po – built in 1954, Grade I (now Grade II)
- North Kowloon Magistracy in Sham Shui Po – built in 1960, not yet graded (later Grade II)
- Old Tai Po Police Station – built in 1899, Grade II historic building [later postponed to Batch II]
- Old Tai O Police Station – built in 1902, Grade III (now Grade II)

A total of 114 applications from non-profit-making organisations were received for the 7 Batch I historic buildings under the Scheme. The Development Bureau announced the competition results on 17 February 2009 (less an award for Old Tai Po Police Station), along with a series of roving exhibitions set for that year. The renovations followed a staggered schedule, with the first project beginning in December 2009 and the last project ending in September 2013.

=== Batch II ===
Batch II of the Scheme started in August 2009. Batch II included the following buildings:

- The Blue House Cluster in Wan Chai
  - Blue House – built in 1923–1925, Grade I
  - Yellow House at Nos. 2-8 Hing Wan Street – built in 1922–1925, Grade II
  - Orange House at No. 8 King Sing Street – built in 1957, not yet graded
- Former Fanling Magistracy in Fanling – built in 1960, not yet graded (now Grade III) [later postponed to Batch III]
- Old House in Wong Uk Village – built in 1911, Declared Monument [bid but not awarded]
- Old Tai Po Police Station (re-launch)
- Stone Houses No. 31-35 Hau Wong Temple New Village, Junction Road – built in 1937–1957, not yet graded (now Grade III)

A total of 38 applications were submitted for 5 buildings. Projects were selected for 3 of the buildings. The work began in December 2012, and all three projects were completed by April 2017.

=== Batch III ===
Batch III of the Scheme began in October 2011. Batch III includes the following buildings:

- Bridges Street Market at No. 2 Bridges Street, Sheung Wan – built in 1953, Grade III
- Former Fanling Magistracy (re-launch)
- Haw Par Mansion at No. 15A Tai Hang Road, Causeway Bay – built in 1933–1935, Declared Monument
- King Yin Lei at No. 45 Stubbs Road, Wan Chai – built in 1937, Declared Monument [later postponed]

A total of 34 applications were submitted. The ACBHC announced the winning proposals for 3 of the 4 buildings in February 2013, but postponed the revitalisation of King Yin Lei. Renovation work ran from June 2016 to June 2018, and the 3 projects were commissioned in December 2018.

=== Batch IV ===
Batch IV of the Scheme began in December 2013. Batch IV includes the following buildings:

- King Yin Lei [later postponed]
- Lady Ho Tung Welfare Centre
- No. 12 School Street
- Old Dairy Farm Senior Staff Quarters

A total of 26 applications were received for the 4 historic buildings in Batch IV. The 3 winning proposals were announced in June 2015; King Yin Lei was again un-awarded, with short-term plans for government management and long-term reassessment. Work on the 3 projects began in the first quarter of 2019, with planned completion dates in 2020 and planned commissioning in 2021.

=== Batch V ===
Batch V of the Scheme began in November 2016. Batch V includes the following buildings:

- Fong Yuen Study Hall, in Tin Liu Tsuen, Ma Wan [later relisted]
- Former Lau Fau Shan Police Station – built in 1962
- Luen Wo Market – Grade III
- Roberts Block, Old Victoria Barracks – Grade II
- Watervale House, former Gordon Hard Camp

The 5 historic buildings received 34 applications. The ACBHC announced the winning proposals for 4 of the buildings in February 2013; Fong Yuen Study Hall was un-awarded, with short-term plans for government management and long-term reassessment. Renovation work is scheduled for 2021–2024, depending on the project.

=== Batch VI ===
Batch VI of the Scheme includes the following buildings:

- Homi Villa – built in early 1930s
- Fong Yuen Study Hall, in Tin Liu Tsuen, Ma Wan (re-launch)
- King Yin Lei (re-launch)
- Tai Tam Tuk Raw Water Pumping Station Staff Quarters Compound, including:
  - Senior Staff Quarters, built in 1905
  - Staff Quarters, built in 1907
  - No.2 Staff Quarters, built in 1936
- Former North Kowloon Magistracy (added later to the batch)

Batch VI of the Scheme is in the planning stages. After a series of "Open Days for Applicants" in December 2019 and a "Workshop for Applicants" in January 2020, proposals were originally due in April 2020 but after two postponements are due in September 2020. This round includes the two previously postponed buildings, King Yin Lei and Fong Yuen Study Hall.

=== Batch VII ===
Batch VII of the Scheme includes the following buildings:

- Watervale House, Former Gordon Hard Camp
- Old Lunatic Asylum (Chinese Block)
- No. 23 Coombe Road
