= Yiu On (constituency) =

Hong Kong constituency

- 耀安
- Elected constituency for the Sha Tin District Council
- Boundary of Yiu On in Sha Tin District
- District: Sha Tin
- Legislative Council constituency: New Territories South East
- Population: 17,630 (2019)
- Electorate: 13,787 (2019)

Current constituency
- Created: 1994
- Number of members: One
- Member: Sin Cheuk-nam (Democratic)

Yiu On
- Traditional Chinese: 耀安
Transcriptions
Yue: Cantonese
- Yale Romanization: Yiuh ōn
- Jyutping: Jiu6 on1

Yiu On is one of the 36 constituencies of the Sha Tin District Council. The seat elects one member of the council every four years. The constituency has an estimated population of 17,630.

== Councillors represented ==
| Election | Member | Party |
|---|---|---|
| 1994 | Wong Mo-tai | DAB |
| 2003 | Ting Tsz-yuen | Frontier |
| 2007 | Wong Mo-tai | DAB |
| 2011 | Stanley Li Sai-wing | DAB |
| 2019 | Kelvin Sin Cheuk-nam | Democratic |

== Election results ==
=== 2010s ===
Sha Tin District Council Election, 2019: Yiu On
| Party | Candidate | Votes | % | ±% |
|---|---|---|---|---|
| Democratic (PfD) | Kelvin Sin Cheuk-nam | 5,953 | 61.50 | |
| DAB (NTAS) | Stanley Li Sai-wing | 3,727 | 38.50 | |
| Majority | | 2,226 | 23.00 | |
| Turnout | | 9,709 | 70.44 | |
| Democratic gain from DAB | | Swing | | |
