= Fang Wenquan =

Fang Wenquan (方文权, born May 1969) is the founder and executive chairman of Tianda Group and Tianda Institute, Hong Kong.

== Early life ==
He studied international relations at the University of Sydney and Tsinghua University. His public roles include co-chairman of the National Strategy Institute, Tsinghua University, a council member of the Chinese People's Institute of Foreign Affairs, a council member of the Sydney Symphony Orchestra, honorary chairman of the Australian Council of Chinese Organizations, and honorary chairman of the Australian Council for the Promotion of the Peaceful Reunification of China. He is actively involved with philanthropy, promoting the value of "Caring for a Better World" and contributing to community services, including donations for poverty relief, education and training, healthcare, scientific research and environmental protection, culture, and the arts.

== Tianda Institute ==
The Tianda Institute is a Hong Kong-based non-profit think tank established by Fang in 2005. Leveraging the competitive edge of Hong Kong as an international city, Tianda Institute aims to contribute to the revival of the Chinese nation, peace, and development of the world through explorations, discussions, and studies on global and Chinese development issues, raising new ideas, arguments, and theories to address economic and social development challenges. Tianda Institute and Tsinghua University co-established the National Strategy Institute at Tsinghua University.
