= Pun Kwok-shan =

Hong Kong politician

Pun Kwok-shan, MH, JP (Chinese: 潘國山; born 1961) is a Hong Kong politician. He is vice-chairman of the New People's Party and member of Civil Force. He is also a former member of the Sha Tin District Council for Tin Sum.

== Biography ==
Pun was first elected to the Sha Tin District Council in 2003 in a three-way contest in Tin Sum for local-based Civil Force. He was re-elected in 2007 and retired in 2011. His seat was replaced by Lau Kong-wah, member of both Civil Force and the pro-Beijing Democratic Alliance for the Betterment and Progress of Hong Kong (DAB), who went on contest the ill-fated 2012 Legislative Council election in the newly created District Council (Second) constituency.

Pun returned to the Sha Tin District Council in 2013 Tin Sum by-election when Lau Kong-wah resigned to take the position of Under Secretary of the Constitutional and Mainland Affairs. He won the seat by taking 2,432 votes. Under his leadership of Civil Force. The group allied with Legislative Councillor Regina Ip's New People's Party in 2014 when he was elected vice-chairman of the party. He was also elected to the Election Committee in 2016. He lost his seat in Shatin District Council in 2019 following a rout of pro-Beijing candidates amidst the 2019–20 Hong Kong protests.

In March 2021, Pun protested against H&M, a company that boycotted cotton from Xinjiang after suspected human rights concerns. However, Pun was spotted wearing shoes from Nike, another company which boycotted cotton from Xinjiang.

Political offices
Preceded by Choy Kan-pui	Member of Sha Tin District Council; Representative for Tin Sum; 2004–2011	Succeeded by Lau Kong-wah
Preceded by Lau Kong-wah	Member of Sha Tin District Council; Representative for Tin Sum; 2013–2019	Succeeded by Tsang Kit
