= Wong Uk Village (Sha Tin District) =

Village in Hong Kong

Coordinates: 22.379712°N 114.199553°E

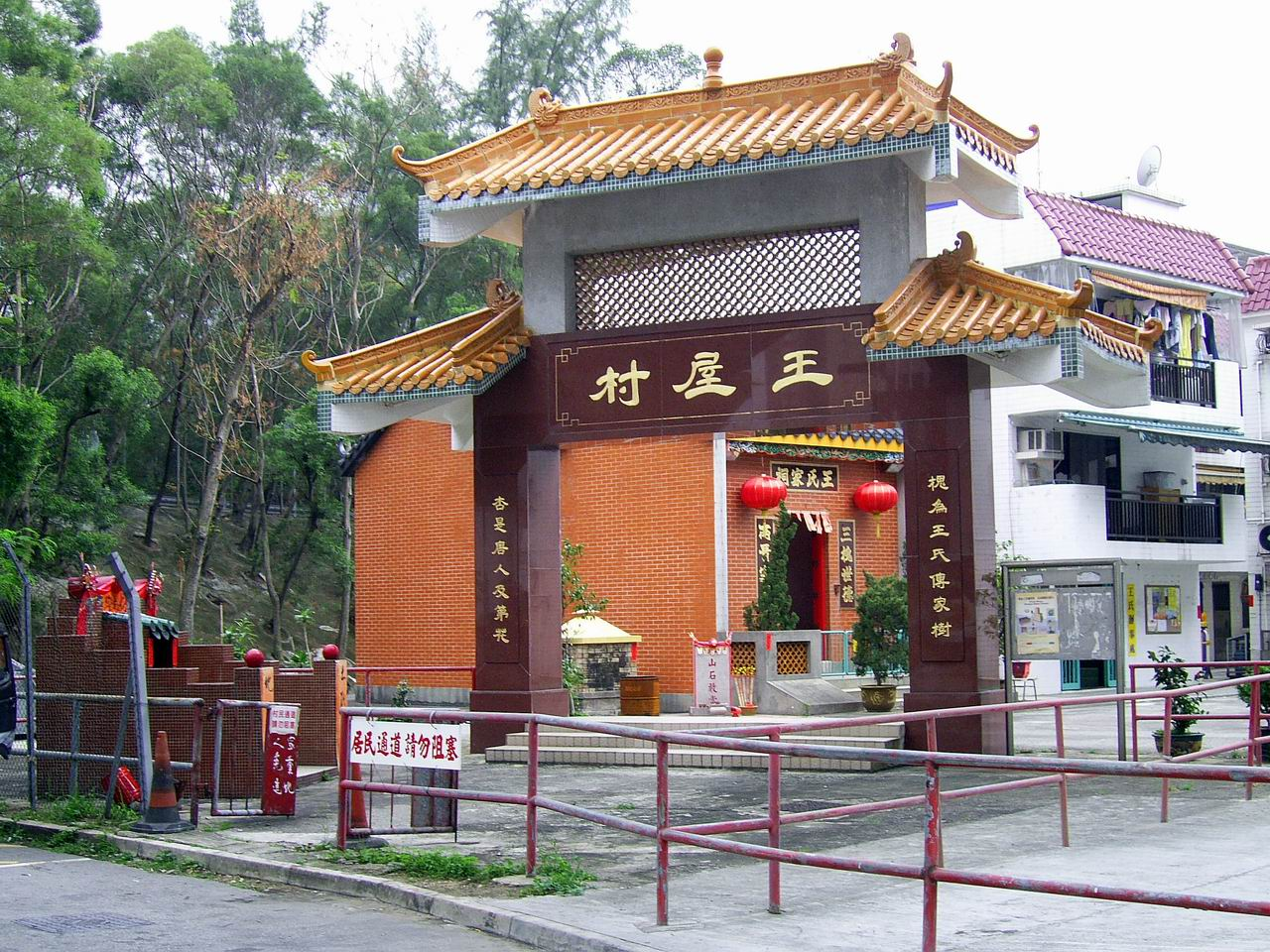
The present Wong Uk Village. The Wong Clan ancestral hall is visible behind the paifang. An Earth God shrine is visible on the left.

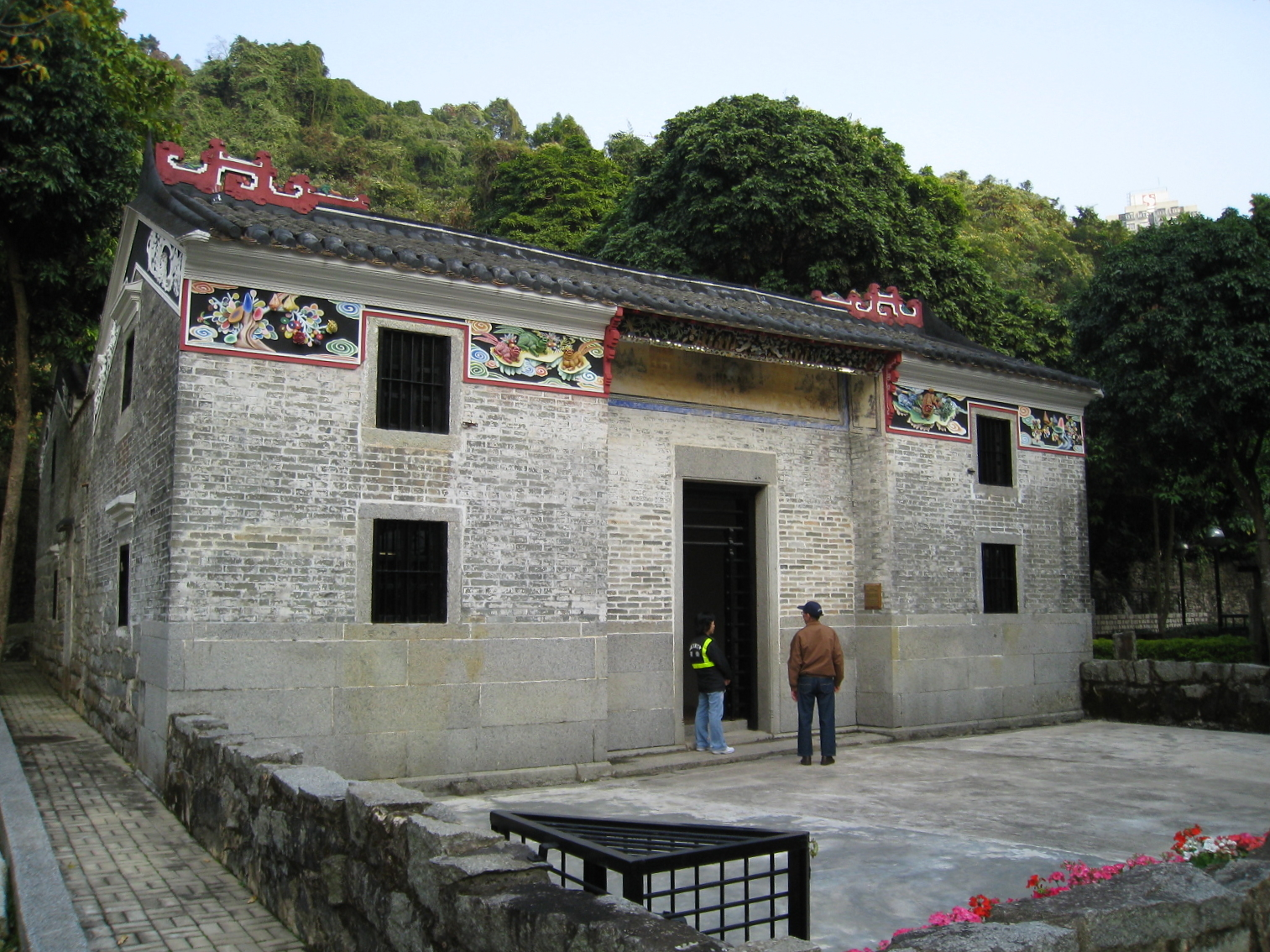
The "Old House", part of the former Wong Uk Village, is a declared monument.

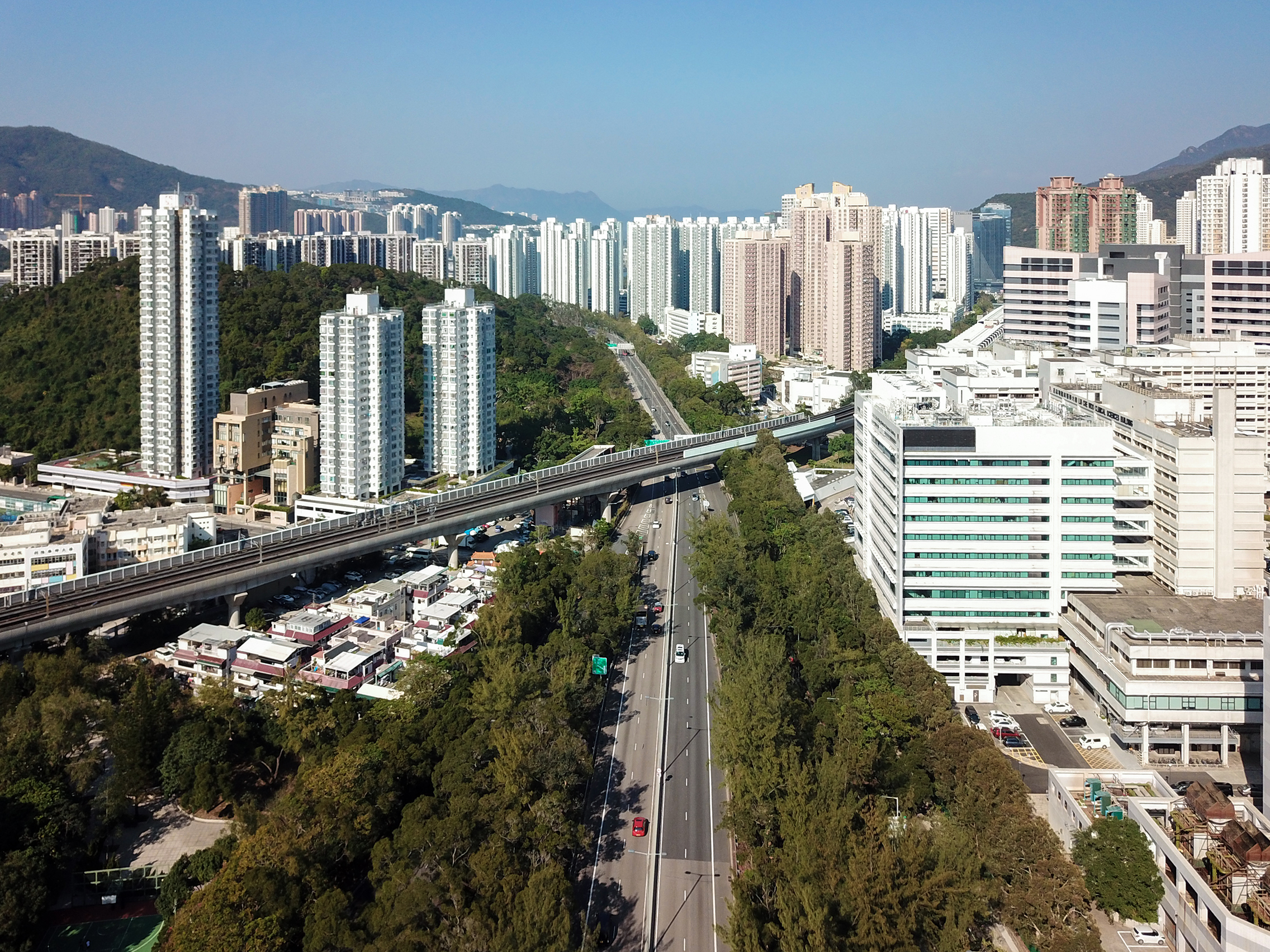
Wong Uk Village (left), elevated tracks of Tuen Ma line, Sha Tin Road (centre) and Prince of Wales Hospital (right).

Wong Uk Village (Chinese: 王屋村) is a village at the southwest of Yuen Chau Kok, Sha Tin, New Territories, Hong Kong. With the exception of the "Old House", the village was demolished in the 1970s to make way for high-density housing and re-established nearby.

== Administration ==
Wong Uk is a recognized village under the New Territories Small House Policy.

== History ==
The village was founded by a couple surnamed Wong from Xingning county of Guangdong province in the 19th century. The village was a trading station for merchants and travellers until the late 19th century. But most of the old buildings in the village were ruined and demolished due to the reclamation of Tide Cove for the development of the Sha Tin New Town. In the mid-1980s, the Hong Kong Government developed the area of the Wong Uk Village into a recreational park, now called the Wong Uk Garden. The villagers moved to the end of Yuen Chau Kok Road to establish the present Wong Uk Village. A new Wong Clan ancestral hall was built there in 1994.

== Old House ==
The "Old House" is the only remnant of the original Wong Uk Village. It is a two-storey green-brick structure building about 100 years old, which was declared a monument in 1989. In 2009, the Old House was part of the buildings of Batch II of the Hong Kong Government's Revitalising Historic Buildings Through Partnership Scheme seeking adaptive reuse of government-owned historic buildings.
