= Lower Shing Mun (constituency) =

Hong Kong constituency

- Elected constituency for the Sha Tin District Council
- Boundary of Lower Shing Mun in Sha Tin District
- District: Sha Tin
- Legislative Council constituency: New Territories North East
- Population: 19,554 (2019)
- Electorate: 10,129 (2019)

Current constituency
- Created: 1994
- Number of members: One
- Member: Vacant
- Created from: Mei Tin
- Replaced by: Chung Tin

Lower Shing Mun is one of the 41 constituencies of the Sha Tin District Council. The seat elects one member of the council every four years. Since its creation in 1994, the seat has continuously been held by the Civil Force until 2019, and is now held by Community Sha Tin's Ken Wong Ho-fung.

== Councillors represented ==
Election	Member	Party
1994	Yu King-yeung	Nonpartisan
1999	Tang Wing-cheong	Civil Force
2003	Constituency abolished	
2007	Ho Hau-cheung	Civil Force
2011	Ho Hau-cheung	Civil Force→NPP/CF
2015	Tong Hok-leung	NPP/CF
2019	Ken Wong Ho-fung→Vacant	Community Sha Tin→Independent

== Election results ==
=== 2010s ===
Sha Tin District Council Election, 2019: Lower Shing Mun
Party	Candidate	Votes	%	±%
Community Sha Tin	Ken Wong Ho-fung	3,894	55.49	
Civil Force (NPP)	Tong Hok-leung	3,124	44.51	+8.46
Majority		770	10.98	
Turnout		7,034	69.52	
Community Sha Tin gain from Civil Force		Swing		

Sha Tin District Council Election, 2015: Lower Shing Mun
Party	Candidate	Votes	%	±%
NPP (Civil Force)	Tong Hok-leung	1,209	35.9	
Nonpartisan	Sherman Chong Yiu-kan	1,175	34.6	
Nonpartisan	Lee Yuen-kam	987	29.3	
Majority		34	1.3	
Turnout		3,427	43.9	
NPP hold		Swing		

Sha Tin District Council Election, 2011: Lower Shing Mun
Party	Candidate	Votes	%	±%
Civil Force	Ho Hau-cheung	uncontested		N/A
Civil Force hold		Swing		

Sha Tin District Council Election, 2007: Lower Shing Mun
Party	Candidate	Votes	%	±%
Civil Force	Ho Hau-cheung	1,864	72.14	
Democratic Coalition	Yan Wing-lok	720	27.86	
Majority		1,114	44.28	
Civil Force win (new seat)				

Sha Tin District Council Election, 1999: Lower Shing Mun
Party	Candidate	Votes	%	±%
Civil Force	Tang Wing-cheong	1,330	75.10	
Independent	Luen Kwok-fai	441	24.90	
Majority		889	50.2	
Civil Force gain from Nonpartisan		Swing		

Sha Tin District Board Election, 1994: Lower Shing Mun
Party	Candidate	Votes	%	±%
Nonpartisan	Yu King-yeung	718		
Nonpartisan	Mak Wai-hung	597		
Nonpartisan	Cheng Chun-wai	584		
Nonpartisan	Lee Yuen-kam	396		
Nonpartisan win (new seat)				
