= Tin Sum (constituency) =

Constituency of the Sha Tin District Council of Hong Kong

- Elected constituency for the Sha Tin District Council
- Boundary of Tin Sum in Sha Tin District
- District: Sha Tin
- Legislative Council constituency: New Territories North East
- Population: 14,327 (2019)
- Electorate: 9,202 (2019)

Current constituency
- Created: 1985
- Number of members: One
- Member: Tsang Kit (Nonpartisan)

Tin Sum is one of the 36 constituencies of the Sha Tin District Council. The seat elects one member of the council every four years. It was first created in 1985 Hong Kong district boards election. The constituency boundary is loosely based on the Tin Sum village and Lung Hang Estate.

== Councillors represented ==
=== 1985 to 1988 ===
Election	Member	Party
1985	Choy Kan-pui	Nonpartisan
198?	Choy Kan-pui	HKAS

=== 1988 to 1991 ===
Election	First Member	First Party	Second Member	Second Party
1988	Choy Kan-pui	HKAS	Fung Chi-wood	Nonpartisan
1990	Choy Kan-pui	United Democrat	Fung Chi-wood	United Democrat

=== 1991 to present ===
Election	Member	Party
1991	Choy Kan-pui	United Democrat
1991	Choy Kan-pui	Independent
1993	Choy Kan-pui	Civil Force
1996	Choy Kan-pui	Progressive Alliance/Civil Force
2003	Pun Kwok-shan	Civil Force
2011	Lau Kong-wah	DAB/Civil Force
2013 by-election	Pun Kwok-shan	Civil Force
2014	Pun Kwok-shan	NPP/CF
2019	Tsang Kit	Nonpartisan

== Election results ==
=== 2010s ===
Sha Tin District District Council Election, 2019: Tin Sum
Party	Candidate	Votes	%	±%
Nonpartisan	Tsang Kit	3,399	52.48	
NPP (Civil Force)	Pun Kwok-shan	3,078	47.52	
Majority		321	4.96	
Turnout		6,491	70.56	
Nonpartisan gain from NPP		Swing		

Sha Tin District District Council Election, 2015: Tin Sum
Party	Candidate	Votes	%	±%
NPP (Civil Force)	Pun Kwok-shan	Uncontested		
NPP hold		Swing		

Tin Sum by-election, 2013
Party	Candidate	Votes	%	±%
Civil Force	Pun Kwok-shan	2,432	66.4	−9.2
Democratic	Ting Tsz-yuen	675	18.4	
People Power (The Frontier (2010-))	Lam Hong-ching	531	14.5	
Nonpartisan	So Pui-lam	23	0.6	
Majority		1,757	47.9	
Turnout		3,673	45.4	+21.9
Civil Force hold		Swing		

Sha Tin District Council Election, 2011: Tin Sum
Party	Candidate	Votes	%	±%
DAB (Civil Force)	Lau Kong-wah	1,612	75.6	
Nonpartisan	Sun Chan-pui	521	24.4	
Majority		1,091	51.2	N/A
Civil Force hold		Swing		

=== 2000s ===
Sha Tin District Council Election, 2007: Tin Sum
Party	Candidate	Votes	%	±%
Civil Force	Pun Kwok-shan	Uncontested		
Civil Force hold		Swing		

Sha Tin District Council Election, 2003: Tin Sum
Party	Candidate	Votes	%	±%
Civil Force	Pun Kwok-shan	1,804	57.8	
Nonpartisan	Chu Mun-shing	1,037	33.2	
Independent	Ng Ping-tong	281	9.0	
Majority		767	24.6	
Civil Force hold		Swing		

=== 1990s ===
Sha Tin District Council Election, 1999: Tin Sum
Party	Candidate	Votes	%	±%
HKPA	Choy Kan-pui	Uncontested		
HKPA hold		Swing		

Sha Tin District Board Election, 1994: Tin Sum
Party	Candidate	Votes	%	±%
Civil Force	Choy Kan-pui	Uncontested		
Civil Force hold		Swing		

Sha Tin District Board Election, 1991: Tin Sum
Party	Candidate	Votes	%	±%
United Democrats	Choy Kan-pui	Uncontested		
United Democrats hold		Swing		

=== 1980s ===
Sha Tin District Board Election, 1988: Tin Sum
Party	Candidate	Votes	%	±%
HKAS	Choy Kan-pui	3,339	71.9	+1.8
Nonpartisan	Fung Chi-wood	2,038	43.9	
Nonpartisan	Ho Wing-chuen	1,566	33.7	
Nonpartisan	Ho Wai	659	14.2	
Nonpartisan	Leung Sai-on	207	4.5	
HKAS hold		Swing		
Nonpartisan win (new seat)				

Sha Tin District Board Election, 1985: Tin Sum
Party	Candidate	Votes	%	±%
Nonpartisan	Choy Kan-pui	2,269	70.1	
Reform	Lee Wai-man	956	29.5	
Nonpartisan win (new seat)				
