= Au Chun-wah =

Hong Kong politician

- 區鎮樺
- Born: 1 October 1980; Hong Kong
- Died: 17 March 2024 (aged 43); Hong Kong

Ray-Joshua Au Chun-wah (Chinese: 區鎮樺, 1 October 1980 – 17 March 2024) was a member of the Tai Po Central constituency of the Tai Po District Council in Hong Kong, and formerly member of the Kwong Fuk and Plover Wu constituency of the Tai Po District Council in Hong Kong. He was a member of The Frontier, the Democratic Party, and the District Government Alliance vice-convener.

Au was first elected to the District Council during the 2003 Hong Kong local elections and at the time was the youngest District Councillor ever elected.

Au died on 17 March 2024.
