= Ho Hau-cheung =

Ho Hau-cheung, SBS, BBS, MH (Chinese: 何厚祥) (born 1952) was the Chairman of Sha Tin District Council between 2012 and 2019. He was the District Councillor for the Lower Shing Mun constituency, and stepped down at the 2019 District Council elections. He was equally convenor of the Civil Force, which formed an alliance with the New People's Party since 2014. He was awarded the Silver Bauhinia Star by the Hong Kong SAR Government in 2017.

Political offices
New constituency	Member of the Sha Tin District Council; Representative for Mei Tin; 1994–2007	Constituency abolished
New constituency	Member of the Sha Tin District Council; Representative for Lower Shing Mun; 2008–2015	Succeeded by Tong Hok-leung
Preceded by Wai Kwok-hung	Chairman of the Sha Tin District Council; 2012–2019	Succeeded by Ching Cheung-ying
New constituency	Member of the Sha Tin District Council; Representative for Wan Shing; 2016–2019	Succeeded by Cheung Hing-wa
