= Tin Fu =

Tin Fu may refer to:

- Tin Fu Court, a public housing estate in Tin Shui Wai, Hong Kong
- Tin Fu stop, an MTR Light Rail stop adjacent to the estate
- Tin Fu Tsai, a village in Tuen Mun District
