= TFU =

TFU is a three-letter acronym that can stand for:

- IATA code for Chengdu Tianfu International Airport
- Task Force Uruzgan, a Dutch reconstruction team in Afghanistan
- Three Forms of Unity, a set of Calvinist religious documents
- Tin Fu stop, Hong Kong (MTR station code)
- Training for Utopia, a defunct metalcore and industrial metal band
- Greater Manchester Police, Tactical Firearms Unit
- Transformers Universe (disambiguation), multiple uses
- Twin Flames Universe, New Age cult and business group
- Star Wars: The Force Unleashed (project), a 2008 multi-media project
  - Star Wars: The Force Unleashed, a video game in the project
  - Star Wars: The Force Unleashed II, the sequel to the above game
