= Tin Yuet =

Tin Yuet may refer to:

- Tin Yuet Estate, a public housing estate in Tin Shui Wai, Hong Kong
- Tin Yuet stop, an MTR Light Rail stop adjacent to the estate
