= Tin Fu Court =

Public housing estate in Tin Shui Wai, Hong Kong

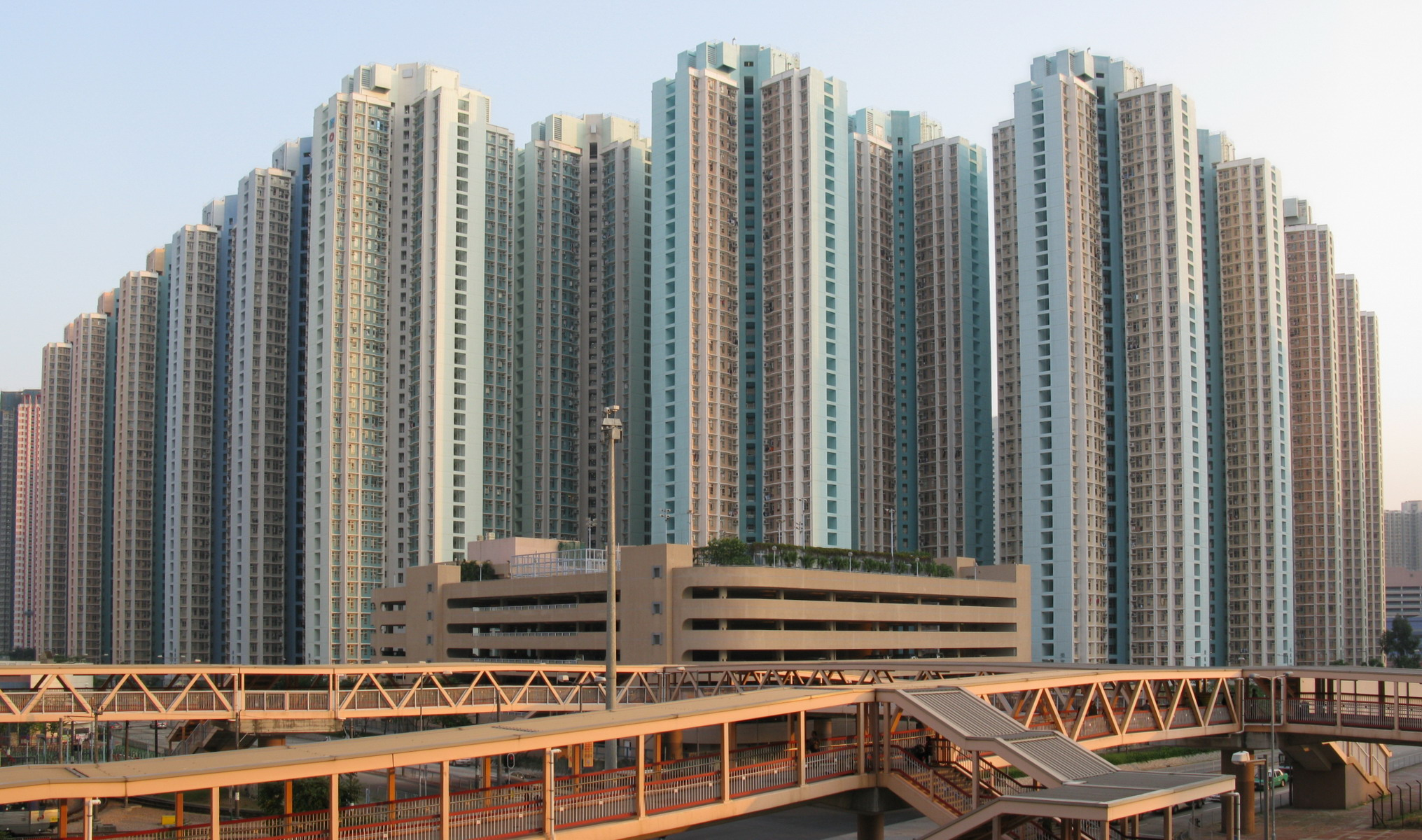
- Tin Fu Court
- Interactive map of Tin Fu Court

General information
- Location: 15 Tin Sau Road, Tin Shui Wai; New Territories, Hong Kong
- Coordinates: 22.46489°N 113.99887°E
- Status: Completed
- Category: Home Ownership Scheme
- Population: 14,766 (2016)
- No. of blocks: 16
- No. of units: 5,120

Construction
- Constructed: 2001; 25 years ago
- Authority: Hong Kong Housing Authority

Tin Fu Court (Chinese: 天富苑) is a Home Ownership Scheme court developed by the Hong Kong Housing Authority in Tin Shui Wai, New Territories, Hong Kong, near Tin Yan Estate, Tin Yat Estate, Tin Yuet Estate, Light Rail Tin Fu stop and Tin Sau Road Park. It comprises 16 residential blocks completed in 2001 and 2007 respectively.

== History ==
=== Short piling scandal ===
In 1999, the piles of Block J (Chui Fu House) were found to be shortened by up to seven meters compared with the standard requirement. Foundation strengthening works was then carried out in the block and completed in 2002. It was resold to the public in 2007.

== Houses ==
Name	Chinese name	Building type	Completed
Yuen Fu House (Block A)	元富閣	Concord 1 Option 2	2001
Hang Fu House (Block B)	亨富閣	Concord 1 Option 2	2001
Chun Fu House (Block C)	俊富閣	Concord 1 Option 2	2001
Long Fu House (Block D)	朗富閣	Concord 1 Option 2	2001
Yan Fu House (Block E)	欣富閣	Concord 1 Option 2	2001
Wing Fu House (Block F)	榮富閣	Concord 1 Option 2	2001
Hing Fu House (Block G)	興富閣	Concord 1 Option 2	2001
Ning Fu House (Block H)	寧富閣	Concord 1 Option 2	2001
Chui Fu House (Block J)	聚富閣	Concord 1 Option 1	2007
Yin Fu House (Block K)	賢富閣	Concord 1 Option 1	2001
Wai Fu House (Block L)	偉富閣	Concord 1 Option 1	2001
Nang Fu House (Block M)	能富閣	Concord 1 Option 1	2001
Chai Fu House (Block N)	齊富閣	Concord 1 Option 1	2000
Sin Fu House (Block O)	善富閣	Concord 1 Option 1	2000
Yat Fu House (Block P)	逸富閣	Concord 1 Option 1	2000
Nga Fu House (Block Q)	雅富閣	Concord 1 Option 1	2000

== Demographics ==
According to the 2016 by-census, Tin Fu Court had a population of 14,766. The median age was 40.8 and the majority of residents (96.7 per cent) were of Chinese ethnicity. The average household size was 3 people. The median monthly household income of all households (i.e. including both economically active and inactive households) was HK$28,000.

== Politics ==
Tin Fu Court is located in Fu Yan constituency of the Yuen Long District Council. It was formerly represented by Kwan Chun-sang, who was elected in the 2019 elections until July 2021.

== See also ==
- Public housing estates in Tin Shui Wai
- List of Home Ownership Scheme Courts in Hong Kong
