= Yiu Yau (constituency) =

Constituency of the Yuen Long District Council of Hong Kong

- Elected constituency for the Yuen Long District Council
- Boundary of Yiu Yau in Yuen Long District
- District: Yuen Long
- Legislative Council constituency: New Territories North
- Population: 13,916 (2019)
- Electorate: 9,302 (2019)

Current constituency
- Created: 2015
- Number of members: One
- Member: Vacant
- Created from: Tsz Yau and Tin Yiu

Yiu Yau (Chinese: 耀祐) is one of the 39 constituencies in the Yuen Long District of Hong Kong.

The constituency returns one district councillor to the Yuen Long District Council, with an election every four years.

Yiu Yau constituency is loosely based on Tin Yiu (II) Estate and part of Tin Yau Court with estimated population of 13,916.

== Councillors represented ==
Election	Member	Party
2015	Ma Shuk-yin	DAB
2019	Ng Hin-wang→Vacant	Democratic

== Election results ==
=== 2010s ===
Yuen Long District Council Election, 2019: Yiu Yau
Party	Candidate	Votes	%	±%
Democratic	Ng Hin-wang	4,027	62.23	
DAB	Ma Shuk-yin	2,444	37.77	−18.03
Majority		1,583	24.46	
Turnout		6,487	69.78	
Democratic gain from DAB		Swing		

Yuen Long District Council Election, 2015: Yiu Yau
Party	Candidate	Votes	%	±%
DAB	Ma Shuk-yin	1,584	55.8	
Nonpartisan	Agatha Wong Pui-yin	1,255	44.2	
Majority		329	11.6	
Turnout		2,914	33.3	
DAB win (new seat)				
