= Tin Yan Estate =

Public housing estate in Tin Shui Wai, Hong Kong

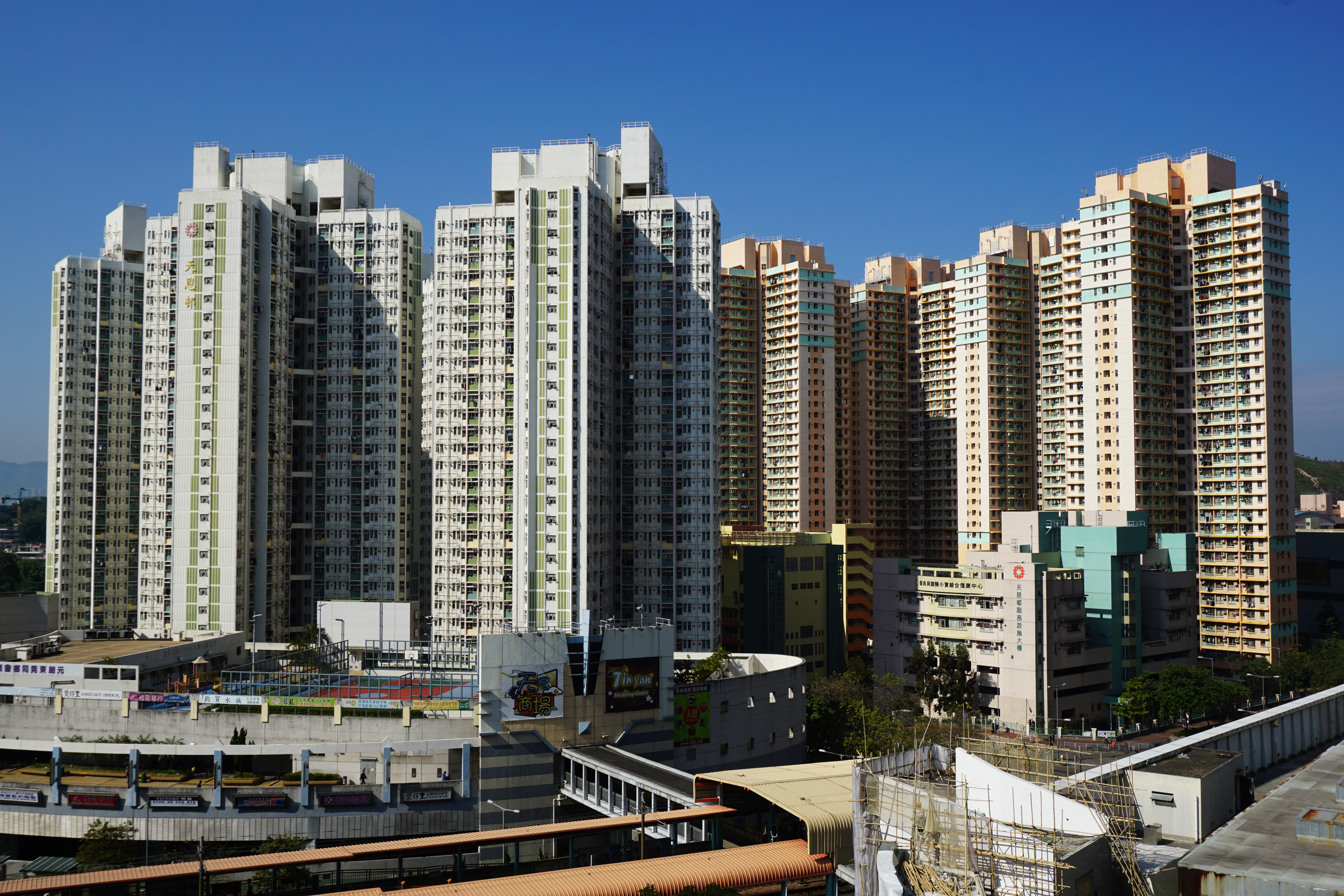
- Tin Yan Estate
- Interactive map of Tin Yan Estate

General information
- Location: Tin Shui Road, Tin Shui Wai; New Territories, Hong Kong
- Coordinates: 22.46314°N 113.99602°E
- Status: Completed
- Category: Public rental housing
- Population: 10,889 (2016)
- No. of blocks: 8
- No. of units: 5,640

Construction
- Constructed: 2002; 24 years ago
- Authority: Hong Kong Housing Authority

Tin Yan Estate (Chinese: 天恩邨) is a public housing estate in Tin Shui Wai, New Territories, Hong Kong, near Light Rail Chung Fu and Tin Fu stops. It consists of eight residential buildings completed in 2002 and 2004 respectively. Four of them were originally designed as an Interim Housing estate, but they were renovated to become a public housing estate in 2004. During the SARS outbreak in 2003, Block 2 and 3 were furnished as temporary quarters for frontline healthcare staff.

== Houses ==
Name	Chinese name	Building type	Completed
Yan Lok House	恩樂樓	Non-standard	2002
Yan Ying House	恩盈樓	Non-standard	2002
Yan Sui House	恩穗樓	Non-standard	2002
Yan Chi House	恩慈樓	Non-standard	2002
Yan Fuk House	恩福樓	Non-standard	2004
Yan Chak House	恩澤樓	Non-standard	2004
Yan Chui House	恩翠樓	Non-standard	2004
Yan Yi House	恩頤樓	Non-standard	2004

== Demographics ==
According to the 2016 by-census, Tin Yan Estate had a population of 10,889. The median age was 47.1 and the majority of residents (98 per cent) were of Chinese ethnicity. The average household size was 2 people. The median monthly household income of all households (i.e. including both economically active and inactive households) was HK$15,000.

== Politics ==
For the 2019 District Council election, the estate fell within two constituencies. Most of the estate is located in the Yuet Yan constituency, which was formerly represented by Hong Chin-wah until July 2021, while the remainder of the estate falls within the Fu Yan constituency, which was formerly represented by Kwan Chun-sang until July 2021.

== See also ==
- Public housing estates in Tin Shui Wai
