= TYU =

TYU may refer to:

- Taiyuan railway station (Shanxi), Shanxi, China, China Railway Pinyin code
- Tin Yuet stop, Hong Kong, MTR station code
- Tshwa language (ISO 639: tyu), a Khoe language spoken in Botswana and Zimbabwe
