= Tin Tsz =

Tin Tsz may refer to:

- Tin Tsz Estate, a public housing estate in Tin Shui Wai, Hong Kong
- Tin Tsz stop, an MTR Light Rail stop adjacent to the estate
