= Fu Yan (constituency) =

Hong Kong constituency

- Elected constituency for the Yuen Long District Council
- Boundary of Fu Yan in Yuen Long District
- District: Yuen Long
- Legislative Council constituency: New Territories North
- Population: 19,671 (2019)
- Electorate: 11,315 (2019)

Current constituency
- Created: 2003
- Number of members: One
- Member: Vacant
- Created from: Kingswood South

Fu Yan (富恩) is one of the 39 constituencies in the Yuen Long District of Hong Kong. The constituency returns one district councillor to the Yuen Long District Council, with an election every four years.

King's Park constituency is loosely based on the Tin Fu Court and Tin Yan Estate area in Tin Shui Wai with estimated population of 19,671.

== Councillors represented ==
Election	Member	Party
2003	Cheung Man-fai	Independent
2011	Lau Kwai-yung	FTU
2019	Kwan Chun-sang→Vacant	TSW Connection

== Election results ==
=== 2010s ===
Yuen Long District Council Election, 2019: Fu Yan
Party	Candidate	Votes	%	±%
TSW Connection	Kwan Chun-sang	4,325	54.87	
FTU	Lau Kwai-yung	3,557	45.13	−22.67
Majority		768	9.74	
Turnout		7,906	69.92	
TSW Connection gain from FTU		Swing		

Yuen Long District Council Election, 2015: Fu Yan
Party	Candidate	Votes	%	±%
FTU	Lau Kwai-yung	2,819	67.8	+15.8
Labour	Keung Kwok-wai	1,339	32.2	
Majority		1,480	35.6	
Turnout		4,201	42.7	
FTU hold		Swing		

Yuen Long District Council Election, 2011: Fu Yan
Party	Candidate	Votes	%	±%
FTU	Lau Kwai-yung	1,838	52.0	
CTU	Lee Cheuk-yan	1,700	48.0	
FTU gain from Independent		Swing		

=== 2000s ===
Yuen Long District Council Election, 2007: Fu Yan
Party	Candidate	Votes	%	±%
Independent	Cheung Man-fai	1,860	59.3	−5.4
Democratic	Kwong Chi-yeung	790	25.2	
Independent	Brownson Yau Tsz-ming	486	15.5	
Independent hold		Swing		

Yuen Long District Council Election, 2003: Fu Yan
Party	Candidate	Votes	%	±%
Independent	Cheung Man-fai	1,306	64.7	
Independent	Alex Au Yeung Hin-wai	398	19.7	
Independent	Ip Ping-kun	313	15.5	
Independent win (new seat)				
