= Yuet Yan (constituency) =

Hong Kong constituency

- Elected constituency for the Yuen Long District Council
- Boundary of Yuet Yan in Yuen Long District
- District: Yuen Long
- Legislative Council constituency: New Territories North
- Population: 18,671 (2019)
- Electorate: 10,231 (2019)

Current constituency
- Created: 2003
- Number of members: One
- Member: Vacant

Yuet Yan (Chinese: 悅恩) is one of the 39 constituencies in the Yuen Long District of Hong Kong.

The constituency returns one district councillor to the Yuen Long District Council, with an election every four years. Yuet Yan constituency is loosely based on part of Tin Yan Estate and Tin Yuet Estate in Tin Shui Wai with estimated population of 18,671.

== Councillors represented ==
Election	Member	Party
2003	Chiu Sau-han	Nonpartisan
2019	Hong Chin-wah→Vacant	Nonpartisan

== Election results ==
=== 2010s ===
Yuen Long District Council Election, 2019: Yuet Yan
Party	Candidate	Votes	%	±%
Nonpartisan	Hong Chin-wah	3,416	54.63	
Nonpartisan	Fennie Lai Yuet-kwan	2,837	45.37	
Majority		579	9.26	
Turnout		6,283	61.48	
Nonpartisan gain from Nonpartisan		Swing		
