= Tin Yiu Estate =

Public housing estate in Tin Shui Wai, Hong Kong

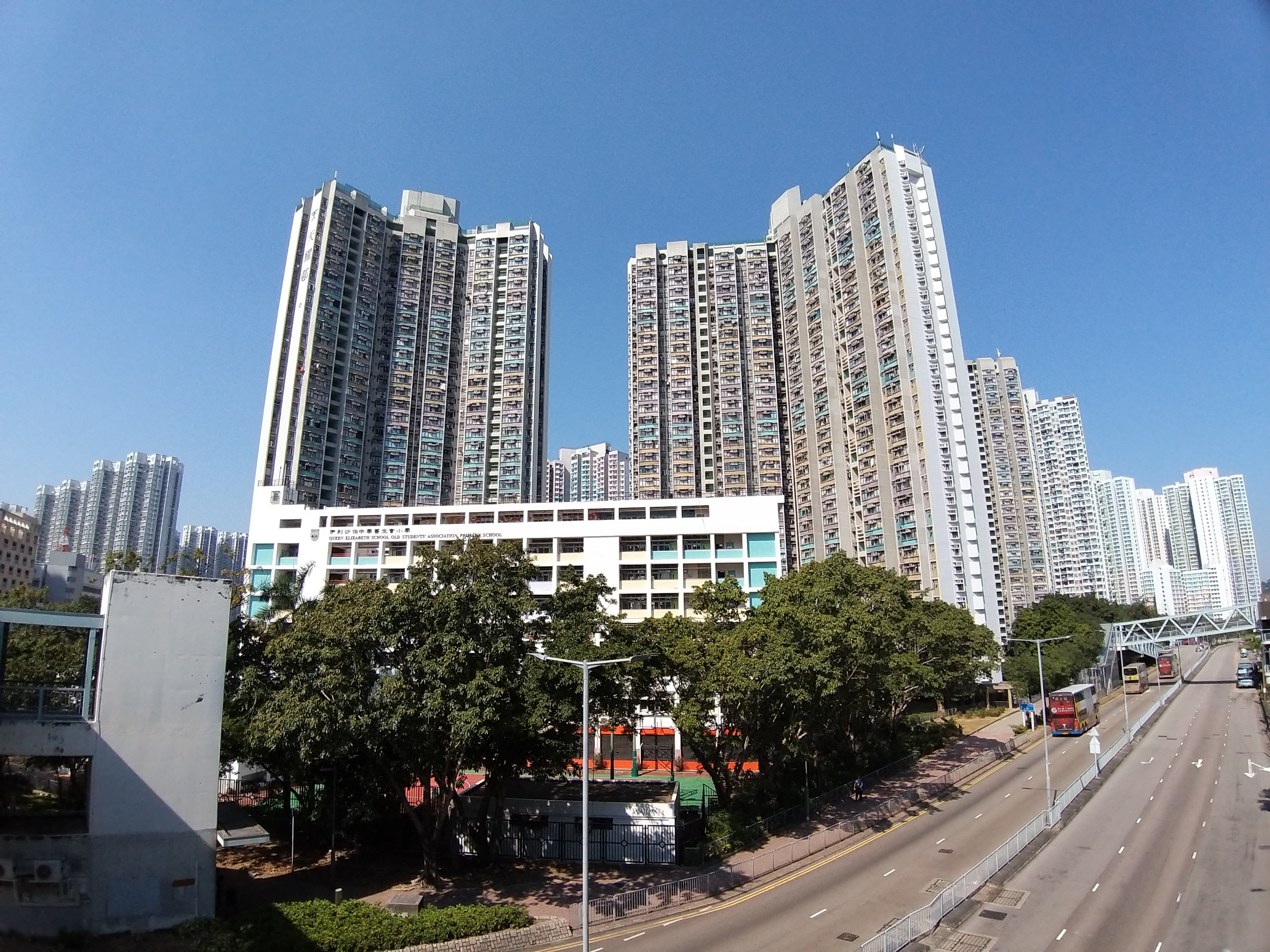
- Tin Yiu (I) Estate
- Interactive map of Tin Yiu Estate

General information
- Location: 2 Tin Wu Road, Tin Shui Wai; New Territories, Hong Kong
- Coordinates: 22.4498196°N 114.0034194°E
- Status: Completed
- Category: Public rental housing
- Population: 24,929 (2016)
- No. of blocks: 12
- No. of units: 4,655 (Tin Yiu (I) Estate); 3,823 (Tin Yiu (II) Estate)

Construction
- Constructed: 1992; 34 years ago (Tin Yiu (I) Estate); 1993; 33 years ago (Tin Yiu (II) Estate)
- Authority: Hong Kong Housing Authority

Tin Yiu Estate (Chinese: 天耀邨) is a public housing estate in Tin Shui Wai, New Territories, Hong Kong, near Light Rail Tin Yiu stop, Tin Tsz stop and Tin Shui Wai stop as well as MTR Tin Shui Wai station. It is the first public housing estate in Tin Shui Wai New Town. It is divided into Tin Yiu (I) Estate (Chinese: 天耀(一)邨) and Tin Yiu (II) Estate (Chinese: 天耀(二)邨), and consists of 12 residential buildings completed in 1992 and 1993.

Tin Yau Court (Chinese: 天祐苑) is a Home Ownership Scheme court in Tin Shui Wai, near Tin Yiu Estate. It consists of three blocks built in 1992.

== Houses ==
=== Tin Yiu (I) Estate ===
| Name | Chinese name | Building type | Completed |
|---|---|---|---|
| Yiu Yat House | 耀逸樓 | Trident 3 | 1992 |
| Yiu Man House | 耀民樓 | Trident 3 | 1992 |
| Yiu Foo House | 耀富樓 | Trident 3 | 1992 |
| Yiu Hing House | 耀興樓 | Trident 4 | 1992 |
| Yiu Hong House | 耀康樓 | Trident 4 | 1992 |
| Yiu Shing House | 耀盛樓 | Harmony 2 | 1993 |

=== Tin Yiu (II) Estate ===
| Name | Chinese name | Building type | Completed |
|---|---|---|---|
| Yiu Chak House | 耀澤樓 | Harmony 2 | 1993 |
| Yiu Fung House | 耀豐樓 | Harmony 2 | 1993 |
| Yiu Tai House | 耀泰樓 | Harmony 2 | 1993 |
| Yiu Wah House | 耀華樓 | Harmony 2 | 1993 |
| Yiu Cheong House | 耀昌樓 | Harmony 2 | 1993 |
| Yiu Lung House | 耀隆樓 | Harmony 2 | 1993 |

=== Tin Yau Court ===
| Name | Chinese name | Building type | Completed |
|---|---|---|---|
| Yau Hong House | 祐康閣 | Harmony 1 | 1992 |
| Yau Ning House | 祐寧閣 | Harmony 1 | 1992 |
| Yau Tai House | 祐泰閣 | Harmony 1 | 1992 |

== Demographics ==
According to the 2016 by-census, Tin Yiu Estate had a population of 24,929 while Tin Yau Court had a population of 5,090. Altogether the population amounts to 30,019.

== Politics ==
For the 2019 District Council election, the estate fell within three constituencies. Tin Yiu (I) Estate is located in the Tin Yiu constituency, which is represented by Ben Ho Wai-pan, Tin Yiu (II) Estate and Tin Yau Court are located in the Yiu Yau constituency, which is represented by Ng Hin-wang, while part of Tin Yau Court falls within the Tsz Yau constituency, which is represented by May Chan Mei-lin.

== See also ==
- Public housing estates in Tin Shui Wai
