= Tin Ching Estate =

Public housing estate in Tin Shui Wai, Hong Kong

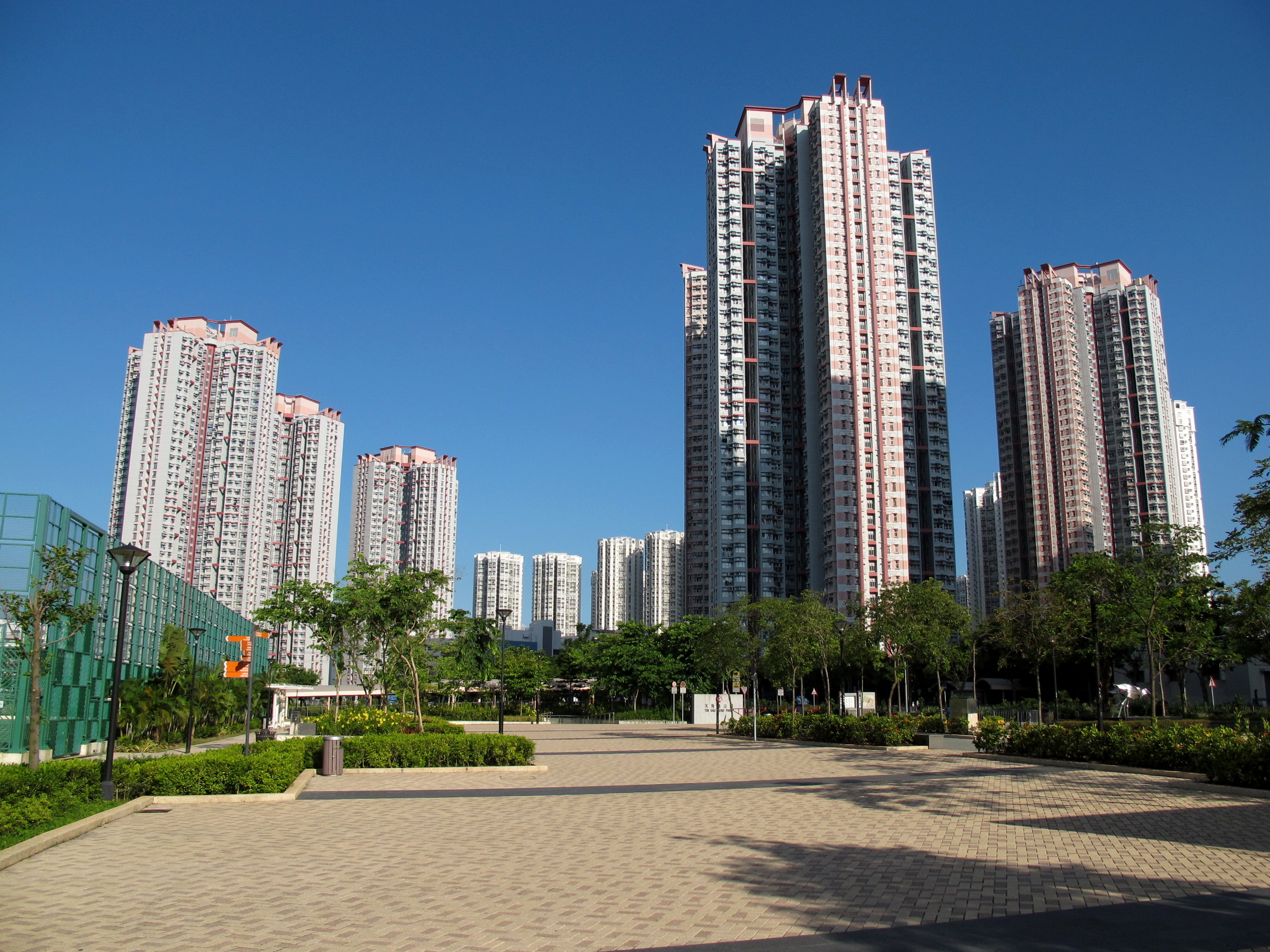
- Tin Ching Estate Phase 1
- Interactive map of Tin Ching Estate

General information
- Location: Tin Kwai Road, Tin Shui Wai; New Territories, Hong Kong
- Coordinates: 22.4634577°N 114.0030156°E
- Status: Completed
- Category: Public rental housing
- Population: 15,884 (2016)
- No. of blocks: 7
- No. of units: 3,800

Construction
- Constructed: 2008; 18 years ago
- Authority: Hong Kong Housing Authority

Tin Ching Estate (Chinese: 天晴邨) is a public housing estate in Tin Shui Wai, New Territories, Hong Kong, near Light Rail Tin Yuet stop. It is divided into two phases and consists of seven residential buildings completed in 2008 and 2010 respectively.

== Background ==
The first and second phases of Tin Ching Estate were occupied on 10 July 2008, while the third phase was occupied on 1 April 2010. In particular, Blocks 1 and 2 (Ching Choi House, Ching Wan House) belong to the second phase, and Blocks 3 and 4 (Ching Pik House, Ching Hoi House) belong to the first phase.

Since the first and second phases in Area 103 were occupied at the same time, the third phase in Area 104 was occupied nearly two years later. Therefore, many people in the district mistakenly believed that the estate was divided into two phases. The first and second phases are the same as the first phase.

== Houses ==
Name	Chinese name	Building type	Completed
Ching Choi House	晴彩樓	Non-standard	2008
Ching Wan House	晴雲樓	Non-standard	2008
Ching Pik House	晴碧樓	Non-standard	2008
Ching Hoi House	晴海樓	Non-standard	2008
Ancillary Facilities Block	服務設施大樓	Non-standard	2008
Ching Hei House	晴喜樓	Non-standard	2010
Ching Moon House	晴滿樓	Non-standard	2010
Ching Yuet House	晴悅樓	Non-standard	2010

== Facilities ==
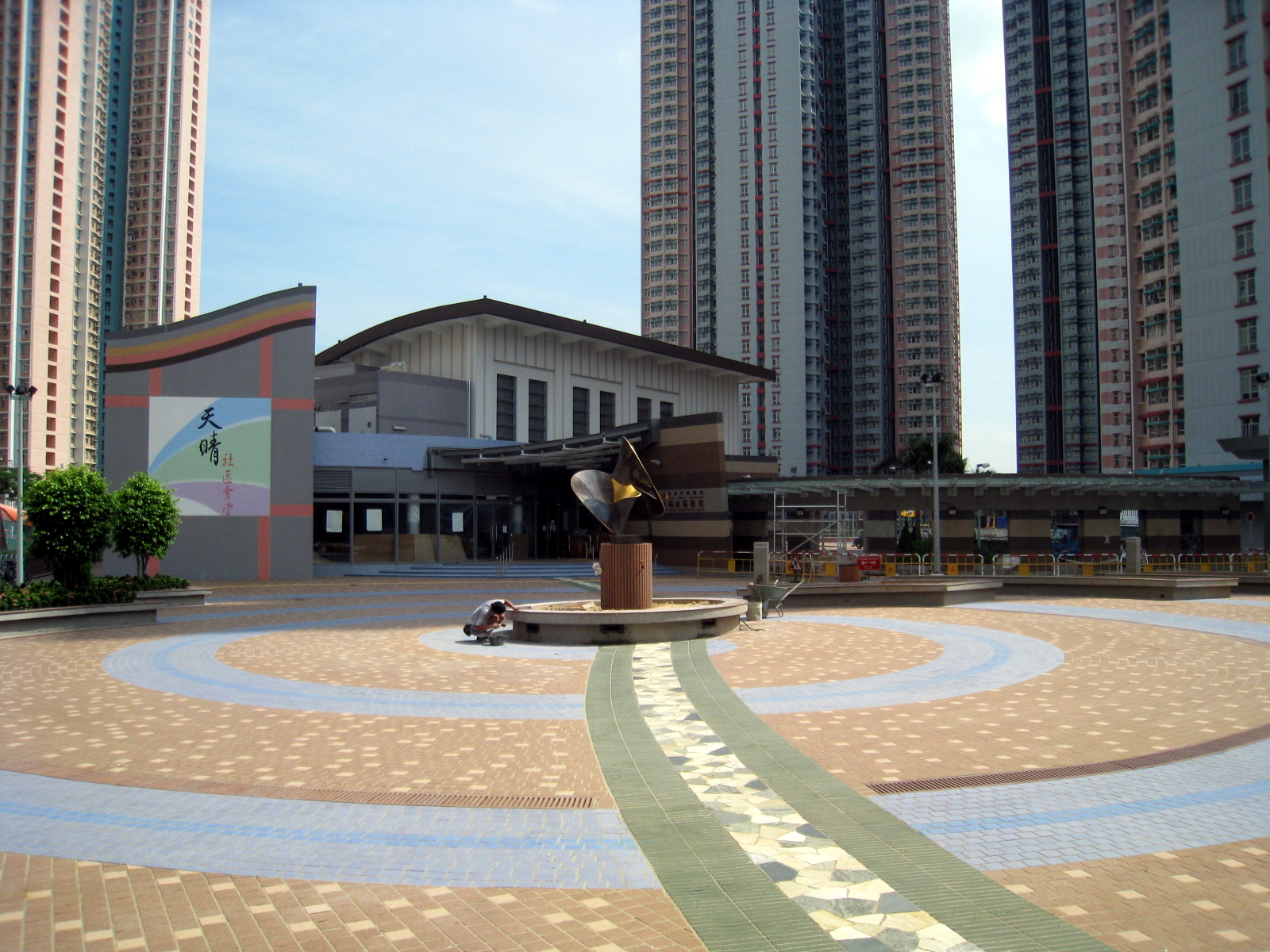
Tin Ching Community Hall

=== Amenity and community building ===
The Tin Ching Amenity and Community Building is a six-storey complex that houses a number of non-governmental organisations providing a range of community and social welfare services. It is also home to the Yuen Long Job Centre of the Labour Department.

The building, which has a gross floor area of around 9,500 square metres, was built on a site originally intended to be an open-air car park. It was constructed by the Housing Authority in response to requests from several social organisations for more operational space in Tin Shui Wai.

=== Commercial centre ===
Tin Ching Estate is served by the Tin Ching Shopping Centre, which is located at the junction of Tin Wah and Tin Kwai roads. The single-storey retail centre opened in 2008 and has eight shops including a supermarket. The shopping centre has a lettable area of 1,407 square metres and is owned and managed by the Housing Authority.

=== Community hall ===
Tin Ching Community Hall is located next to Tin Yuet stop of the light rail. Operated by the Yuen Long District Office, the hall serves as a venue for performances, sports, and community events.

== Demographics ==
According to the 2016 by-census, Tin Ching Estate had a population of 15,884. The median age was 39.8 and the majority of residents (97.3 per cent) were of Chinese ethnicity. The average household size was 2.6 people. The median monthly household income of all households (i.e. including both economically active and inactive households) was HK$16,500.

== Politics ==
Tin Ching Estate is located in Ching King constituency of the Yuen Long District Council. It is currently represented by Kwok Man-ho, who was elected in the 2019 elections.

== See also ==
- Public housing estates in Tin Shui Wai
