= Ching King (constituency) =

Hong Kong constituency

- Elected constituency for the Yuen Long District Council
- Boundary of Ching King in Yuen Long District
- District: Yuen Long
- Legislative Council constituency: New Territories North
- Population: 19,077 (2019)
- Electorate: 9,962 (2019)

Current constituency
- Created: 2011
- Number of members: One
- Member: Vacant

Ching King (Chinese: 晴景) is one of the 39 constituencies in the Yuen Long District of Hong Kong.

The constituency returns one district councillor to the Yuen Long District Council, with an election every four years. Ching King constituency is loosely based on part of Tin Ching Estate and Vianni Cove in Tin Shui Wai with estimated population of 19,077.

== Councillors represented ==
Election	Member	Party
2011	Tang Cheuk-him	FTU
2019	Kwok Man-ho→Vacant	Democratic

== Election results ==
=== 2010s ===
Yuen Long District Council Election, 2019: Pek Long
Party	Candidate	Votes	%	±%
Democratic	Kwok Man-ho	3,809	54.70	
FTU	Tang Cheuk-him	3,154	45.30	
Majority		655	9.40	
Turnout		6,982	70.14	
Democratic gain from FTU		Swing		
