= Public housing estates in Tin Shui Wai =

Public housing in Tin Shui Wai, Hong Kong

This is a list of public housing estates (including Private Sector Participation Scheme (PSPS), Home Ownership Scheme (HOS) and Tenants' Purchase Scheme (TPS) in Tin Shui Wai New Town, Hong Kong.

== Overview ==
Name		Type	Inaug.	No Blocks	No Units	Notes
Grandeur Terrace	俊宏軒	Public	2003	11	4,100	
Tin Chak Estate	天澤邨	Public	2001	6	4,216	
Tin Ching Estate	天晴邨	Public	2008	8	3,800	
Tin Chung Court	天頌苑	HOS	1999, 2009	15	6,080	
Tin Fu Court	天富苑	HOS	2001, 2007	16	5,120	
Tin Oi Court	天愛苑	HOS	1993	2	1,216	
Tin Lai Court	天麗苑	HOS	1997	1	756	
Tin Heng Estate	天恆邨	Public	2001	14	5,760	
Tin Shing Court	天盛苑	HOS	1999	17	6,580	
Tin Shui (I) Estate	天瑞(一)邨	Public	1993	7	4,615	
Tin Shui (II) Estate	天瑞(二)邨	Public	1993	5	3,170	
Tin Tsz Estate	天慈邨	Public	1997	4	3,392	
Tin Wah Estate	天華邨	Public	1999	7	3,719	
Tin Yan Estate	天恩邨	Public	2004	8	5,640	
Tin Yat Estate	天逸邨	Public	2001	9	3,330	
Tin Yau Court	天祐苑	HOS	1992	3	1,824	
Tin Yiu (I) Estate	天耀(一)邨	Public	1992	6	4,655	
Tin Yiu (II) Estate	天耀(二)邨	Public	1993	6	3,823	
Tin Yuet Estate	天悅邨	Public	2000	6	4,192	

== Tin Chak Estate ==
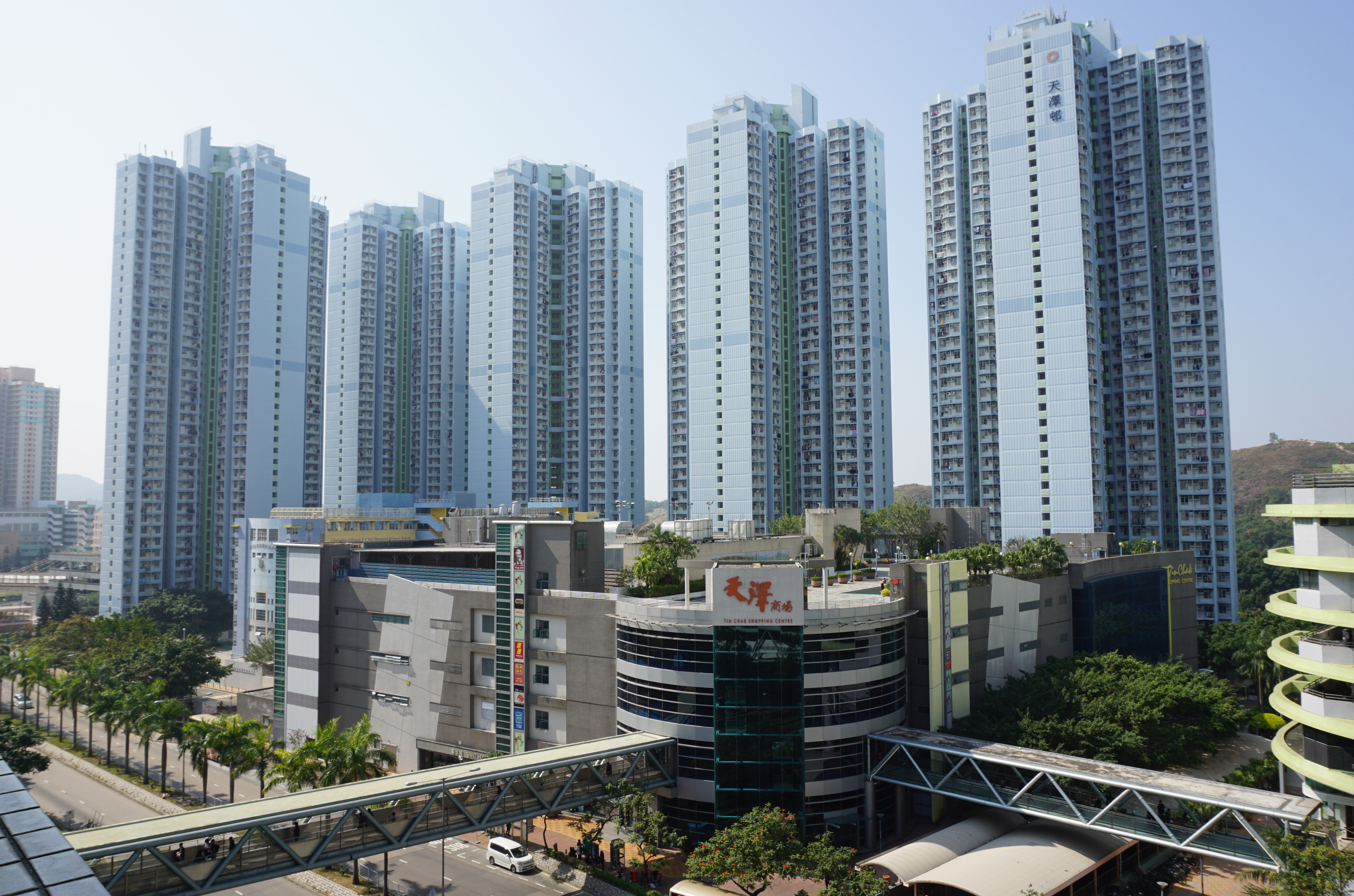
Tin Chak Estate

Tin Chak Estate (Chinese: 天澤邨) is a public housing estate in Tin Shui Wai, Yuen Long, New Territories, Hong Kong. It comprises 6 residential buildings completed in 2001.

Name	Type	Completion
Chak Fai House	Harmony 1	2001
Chak Sing House	Harmony 1	2001
Chak Sun House	Harmony 1	2001
Chak Yun House	Harmony 1	2001
Chak Yu House	Harmony 1	2001
Ancillary Facilities Block	Senior Citizens	2001

== Tin Ching Estate ==
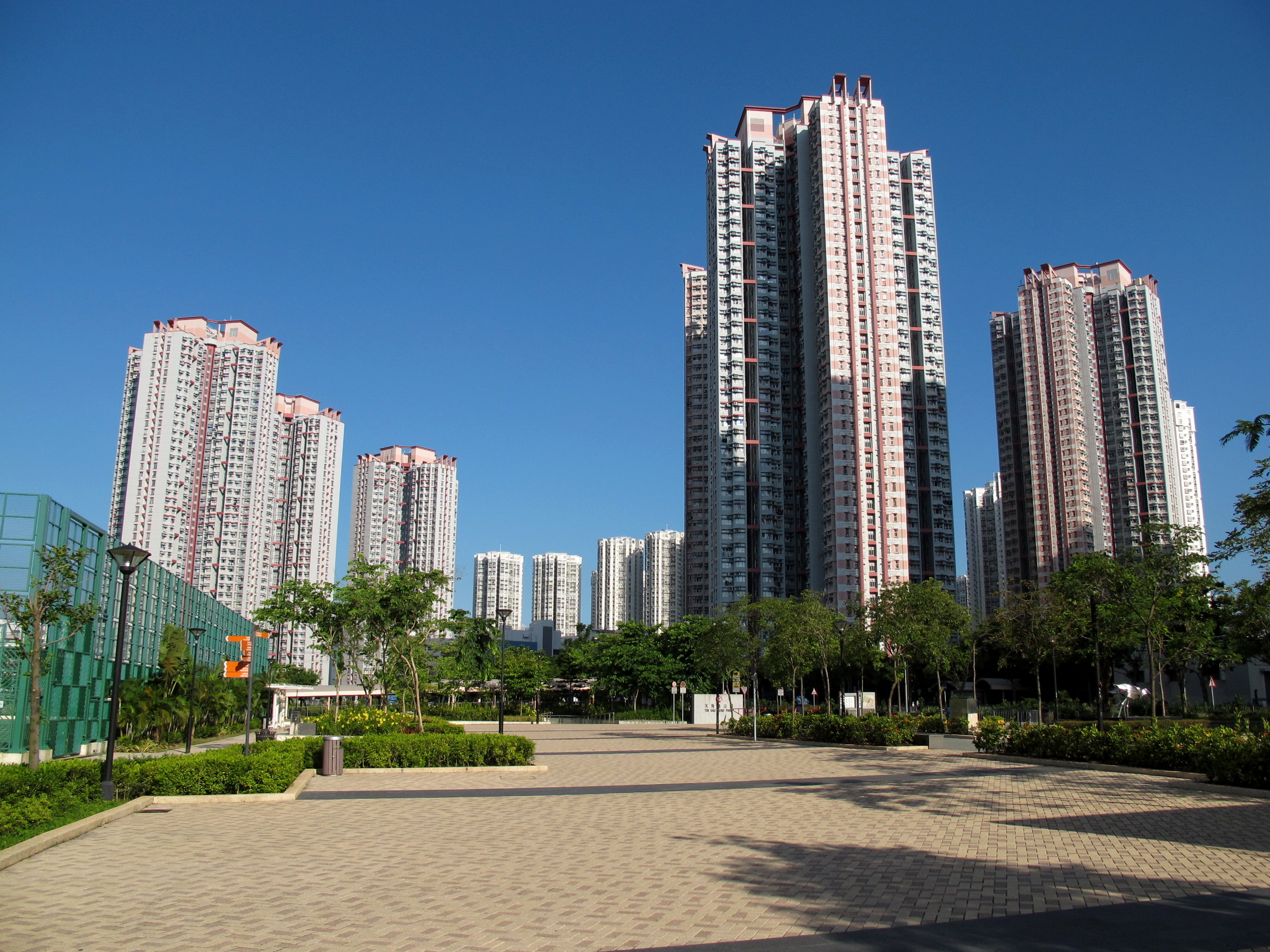
Tin Ching Estate Phase 1

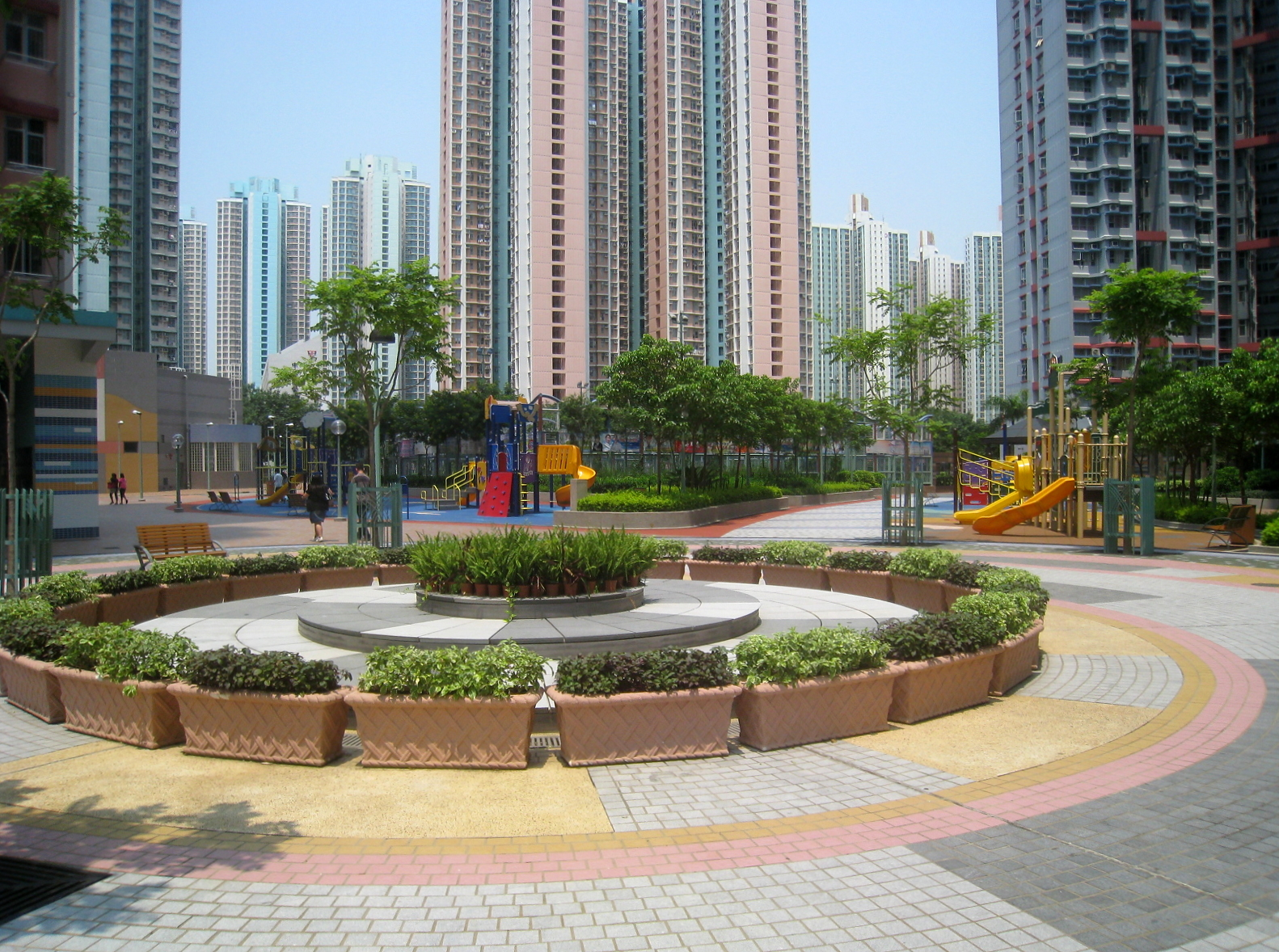
Open space in Tin Ching Estate Phase 1

Tin Ching Estate (Chinese: 天晴邨) is a public housing estate in Tin Shui Wai. It is divided into 2 phases and consists of 7 residential buildings completed in 2008 and 2010 respectively.

Name	Type	Completion
Ching Choi House	Non-standard	2008
Ching Wan House	Non-standard	2008
Ching Pik House	Non-standard	2008
Ching Hoi House	Non-standard	2008
Ancillary Facilities Block	Non-standard	2008
Ching Hei House	Non-standard	2010
Ching Moon House	Non-standard	2010
Ching Yuet House	Non-standard	2010

== Tin Chung Court ==
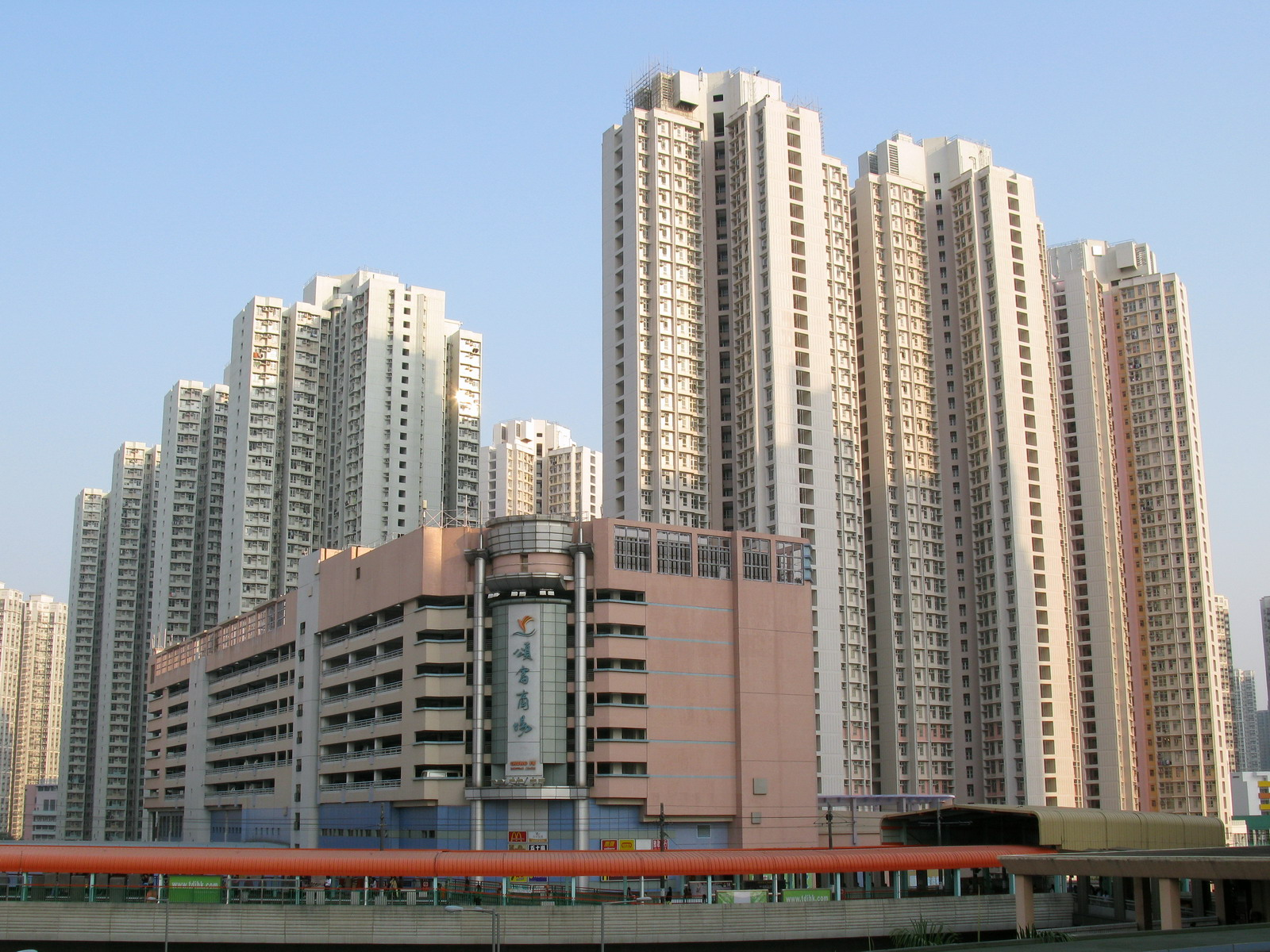
Tin Chung Court

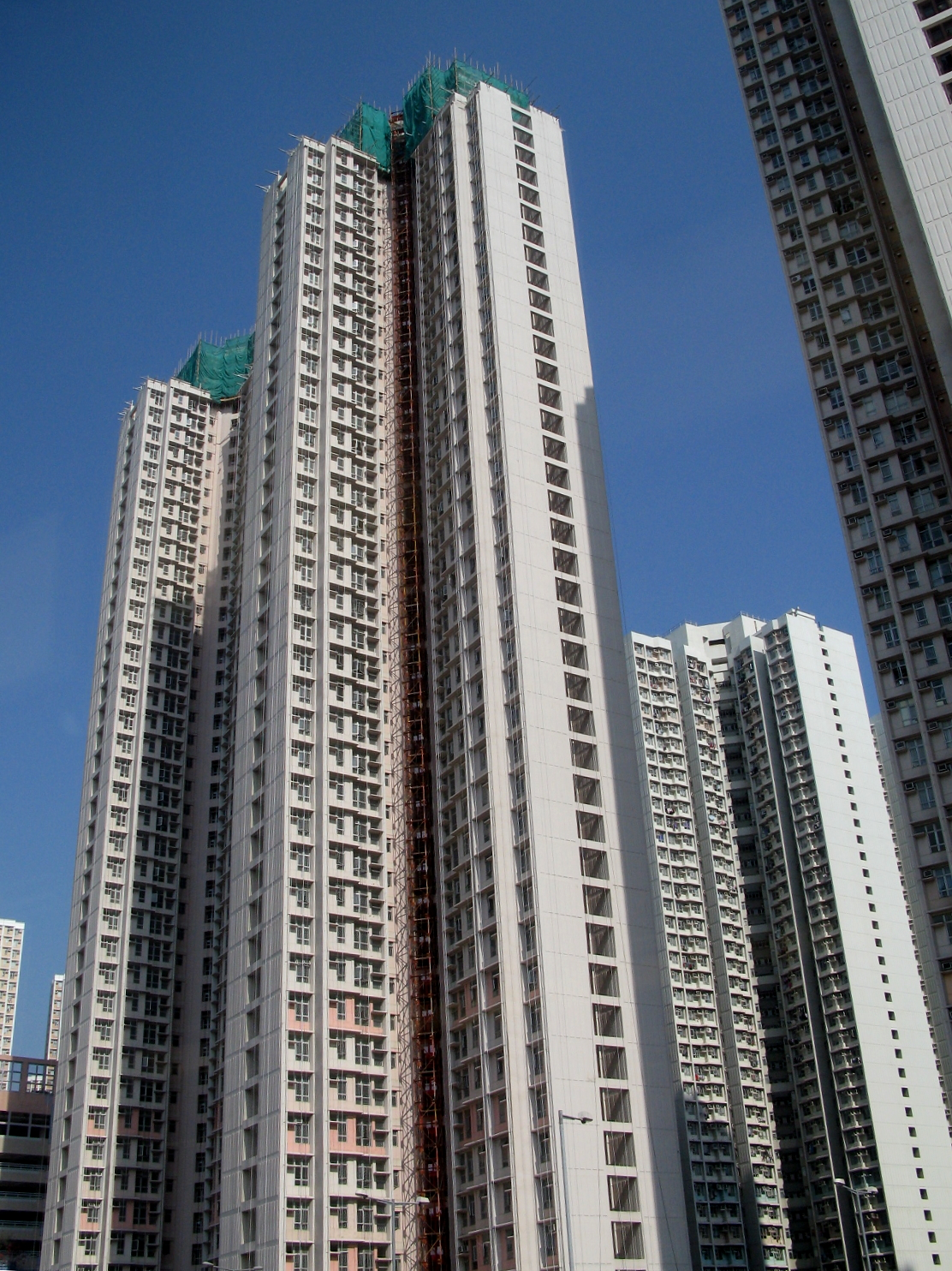
Block K and L of Tin Chung Court, the buildings in which the short pilings were found

Tin Chung Court (Chinese: 天頌苑) is a HOS court in Tin Shui Wai, located near Tin Wah Estate. It comprises 15 blocks completed in 1999 and 2002 respectively.

=== Short-piling scandal ===
In 1999, the piles of Blocks K (Chung Po House) and L (Chung Ho House) were found to be shortened by up to seven meters compared with the standard requirement. Foundation strengthening works was then carried out in the block and completed in 2002. 640 units in the two blocks were sold to the public in 2009.

Name	Type	Completion
Chung Ting House (Block A)	Concord 1	1999
Chung Toi House (Block B)	Concord 1	1999
Chung Lau House (Block C)	Concord 1	1999
Chung Shui House (Block D)	Concord 1	1999
Chung Pik House (Block E)	Concord 1	1999
Chung Hoi House (Block F)	Concord 1	2002
Chung Ying House (Block G)	Concord 1	2002
Chung Yuet House (Block H)	Concord 1	2002
Chung Yan House (Block J)	Concord 1	2002
Chung Po House (Block K)	Concord 1	2009
Chung Ho House (Block L)	Concord 1	2009
Chung Chak House (Block M)	Harmony 1	1999
Chung Kam House (Block N)	Harmony 1	1999
Chung Ki House (Block O)	Harmony 1	1999
Chung Wa House (Block P)	Harmony 1	1999

== Tin Fu Court ==
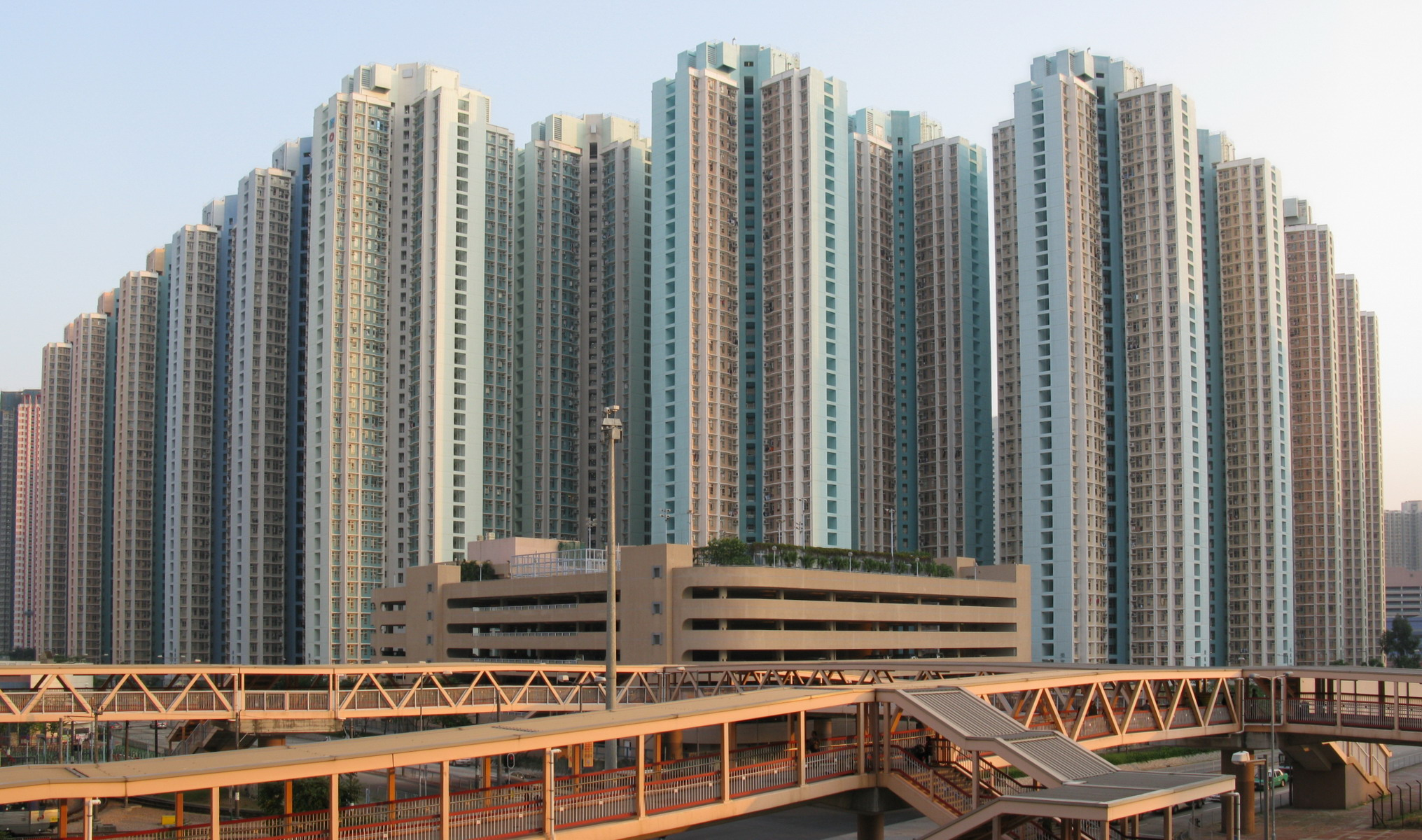
Tin Fu Court

Tin Fu Court (Chinese: 天富苑) is a HOS court in Tin Shui Wai, located near Tin Yan Estate, Tin Yuet Estate and Tin Yat Estate. It comprises 16 Concord-type, 41-storeyed blocks completed in 2001 and 2007 respectively.

=== Short-piling scandal ===
In 1999, the piles of Block J (Chui Fu House) were found to be shortened by up to seven meters compared with the standard requirement. Foundation strengthening works was then carried out in the block and completed in 2002. It was resold to the public in 2007.

Name	Type	Completion
Yuen Fu House (Block A)	Concord 1	2001
Hang Fu House (Block B)	Concord 1	2001
Chun Fu House (Block C)	Concord 1	2001
Long Fu House (Block D)	Concord 1	2001
Yan Fu House (Block E)	Concord 1	2001
Wing Fu House (Block F)	Concord 1	2001
Hing Fu House (Block G)	Concord 1	2001
Ning Fu House (Block H)	Concord 1	2001
Chui Fu House (Block J)	Concord 1	2007
Yin Fu House (Block K)	Concord 1	2001
Wai Fu House (Block L)	Concord 1	2001
Nang Fu House (Block M)	Concord 1	2001
Chai Fu House (Block N)	Concord 1	2001
Sin Fu House (Block O)	Concord 1	2001
Yat Fu House (Block P)	Concord 1	2001
Nga Fu House (Block Q)	Concord 1	2001

== Tin Lai Court ==
Tin Lai Court (Chinese: 天麗苑) is a HOS estate in Tin Shui Wai, near Tin Tsz Estate. It has only one Harmony-typed block built in 1997.

Name	Type	Completion
Tin Lai Court	Harmony 1	1997

== Tin Heng Estate ==
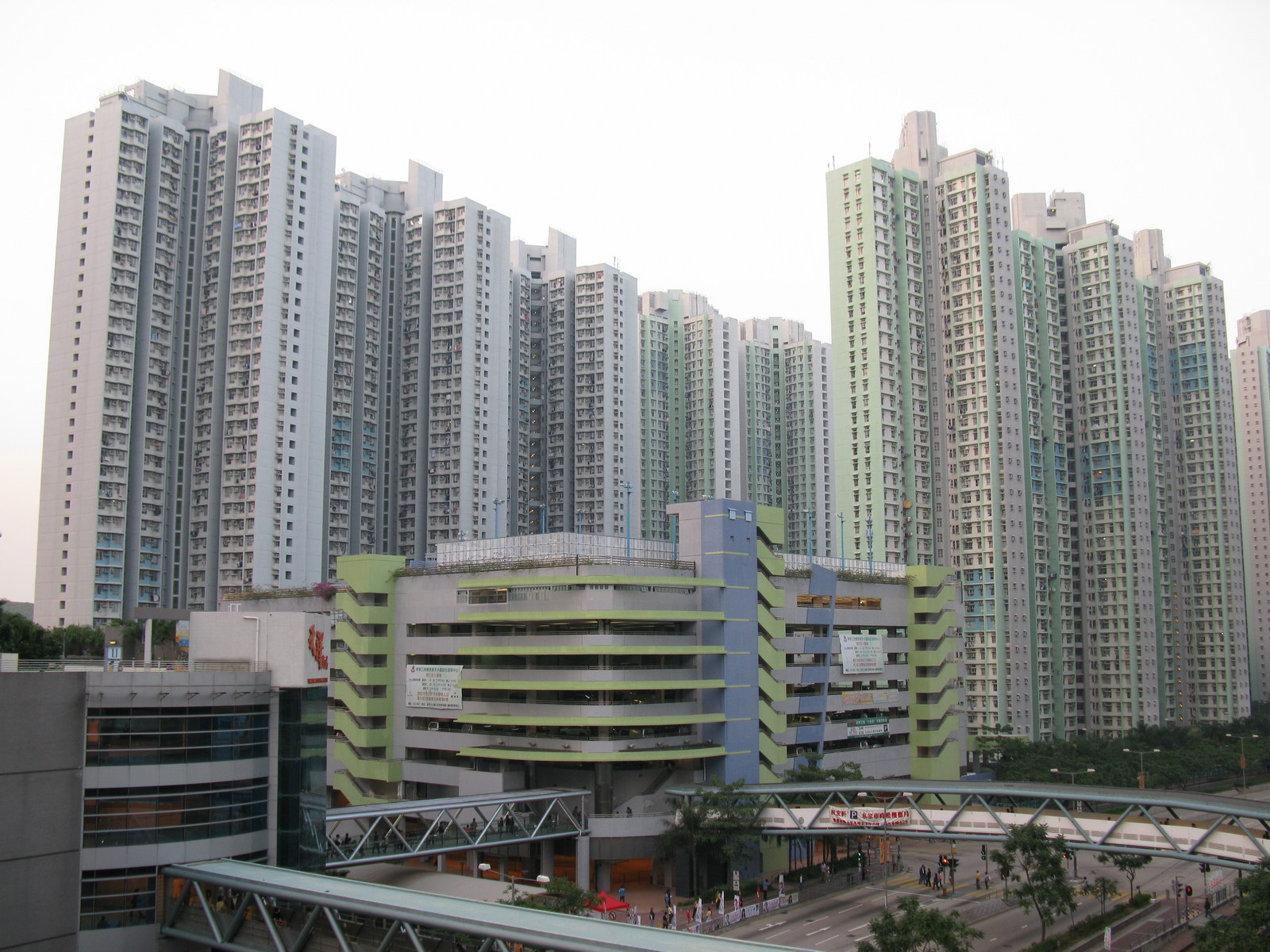
Tin Heng Estate

Tin Heng Estate (Chinese: 天恆邨) is the northernmost Housing Authority public rental housing estate of Tin Shui Wai, located near and Hong Kong Wetland Park. It has totally 14 residential buildings completed in 2001.

Name	Type	Completion
Heng Chi House	New Cruciform (Ver.1999)	2001
Heng Fai House	New Cruciform (Ver.1999)	2001
Heng Chui House	New Cruciform (Ver.1999)	2001
Heng Tung House	New Cruciform (Ver.1999)	2001
Heng Wan House	New Cruciform (Ver.1999)	2001
Heng Kin House	Harmony 1	2001
Heng Kwai House	Harmony 1	2001
Heng Fu House	Harmony 1	2001
Heng Cheuk House	Concord 1	2001
Heng Yan House	Concord 1	2001
Heng Lai House	Concord 1	2001
Heng Moon House	Concord 1	2001
Heng Chun House	Concord 1	2001
Heng Lok House	Concord 1	2001

Heng Lok House was put under lockdown due to Covid pandemic between 2 and 3 February 2021. Heng Chui House and Heng Chun House were sealed on 27 February 2022.

== Tin Oi Court ==
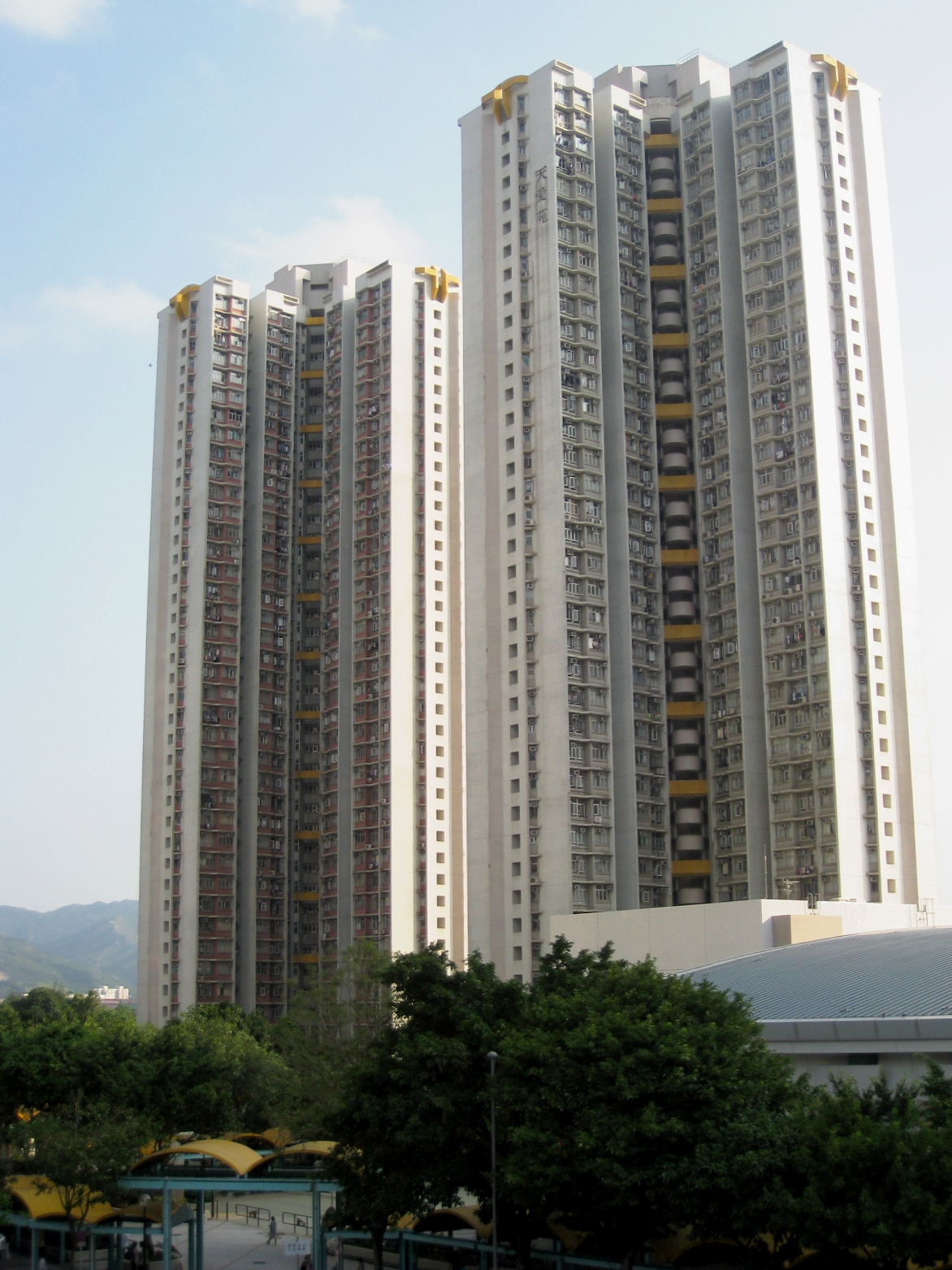
Tin Oi Court

Tin Oi Court (Chinese: 天愛苑) is a HOS court in Tin Shui Estate, Tin Shui Wai. It has only two blocks completed in 1993.

Name	Type	Completion
Oi Chiu House	Harmony 1	1993
Oi Tao House	Harmony 1	1993

== Tin Shing Court ==
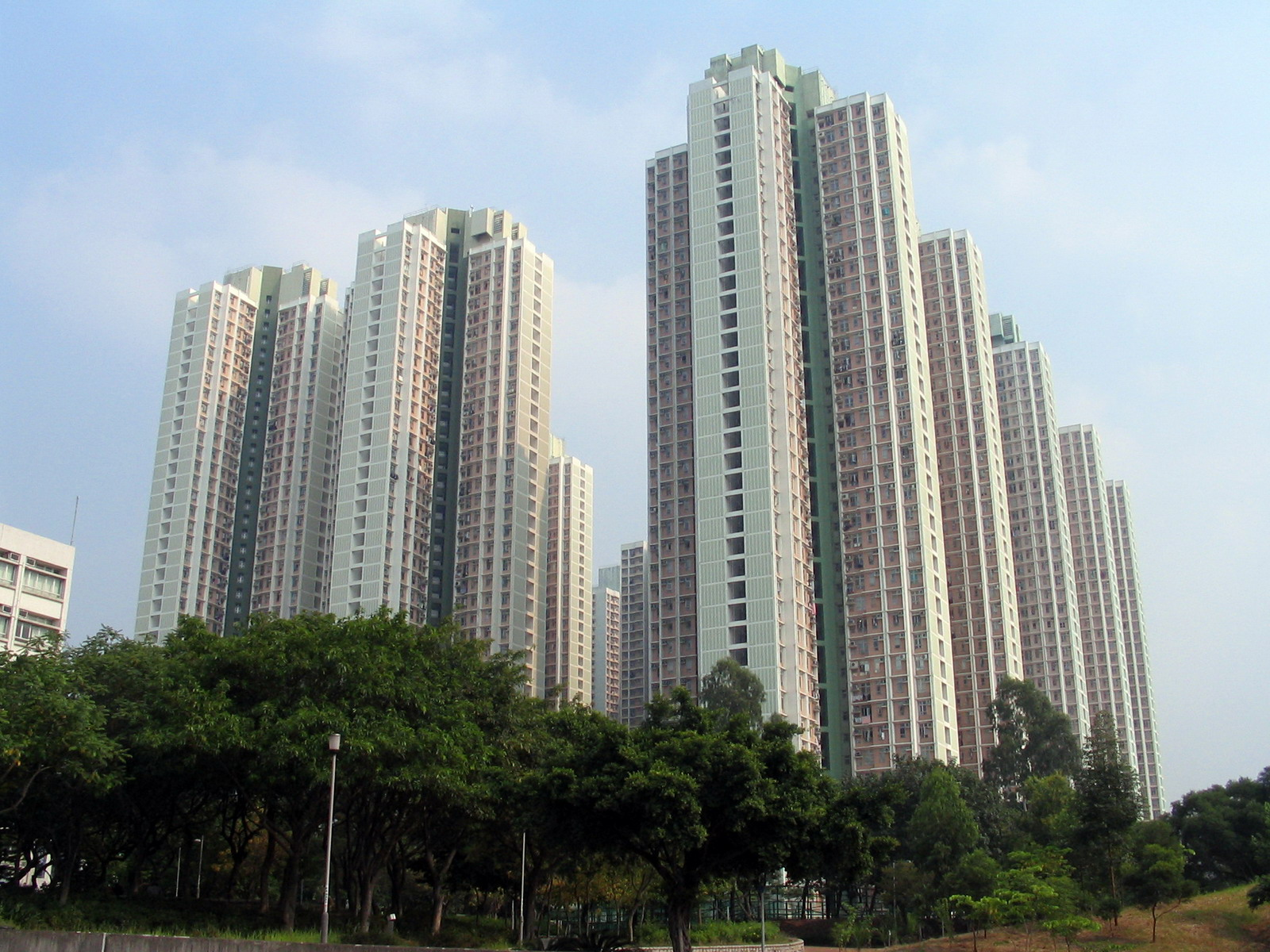
Tin Shing Court

Tin Shing Court (Chinese: 天盛苑) is a HOS court in Tin Shui Wai, located near Tin Yiu Estate and MTR Tin Shui Wai station. It has totally 17 residential buildings completed in 1999.

Name	Type	Completion
Shing Choi House (Block A)	Harmony 1	1999
Shing Chiu House (Block B)	Harmony 1	1999
Shing Yi House (Block C)	Harmony 1	1999
Shing Yin House (Block D)	Harmony 1	1999
Shing Kan House (Block E)	Concord 1	1999
Shing Chi House (Block F)	Concord 1	1999
Shing Wui House (Block G)	Concord 2	1999
Shing Him House (Block H)	Concord 1	1999
Shing Yuet House (Block J)	Concord 1	1999
Shing Ting House (Block K)	Concord 1	1999
Shing Hang House (Block L)	Concord 1	1999
Shing Yuk House (Block M)	Concord 1	1999
Shing Chun House (Block N)	Concord 1	1999
Shing Chuen House (Block O)	Concord 1	1999
Shing Yu House (Block P)	Concord 1	1999
Shing Kwan House (Block Q)	Concord 1	1999
Shing Lai House (Block R)	Concord 1	1999

== Tin Shui Estate ==
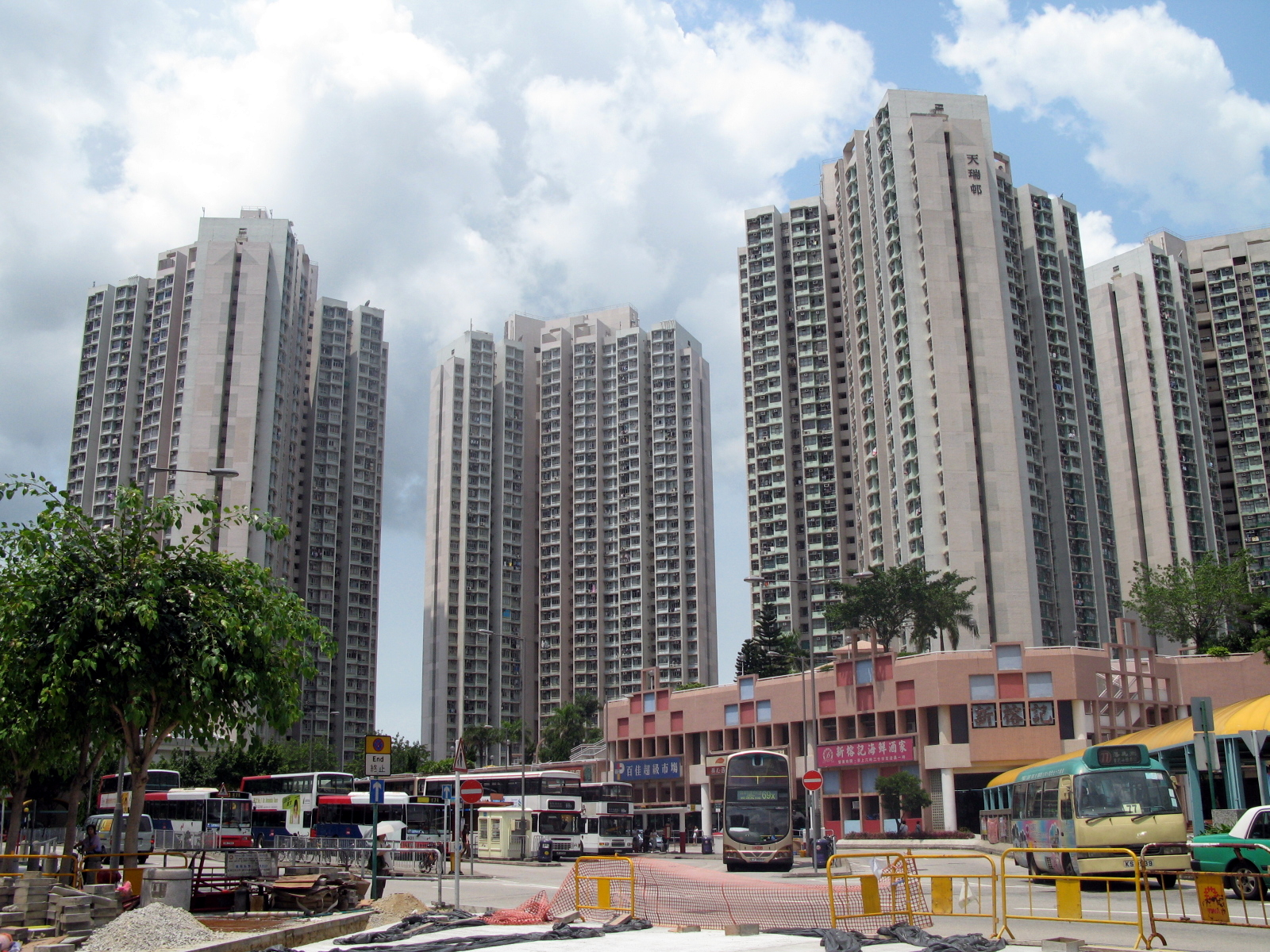
Tin Shui Estate

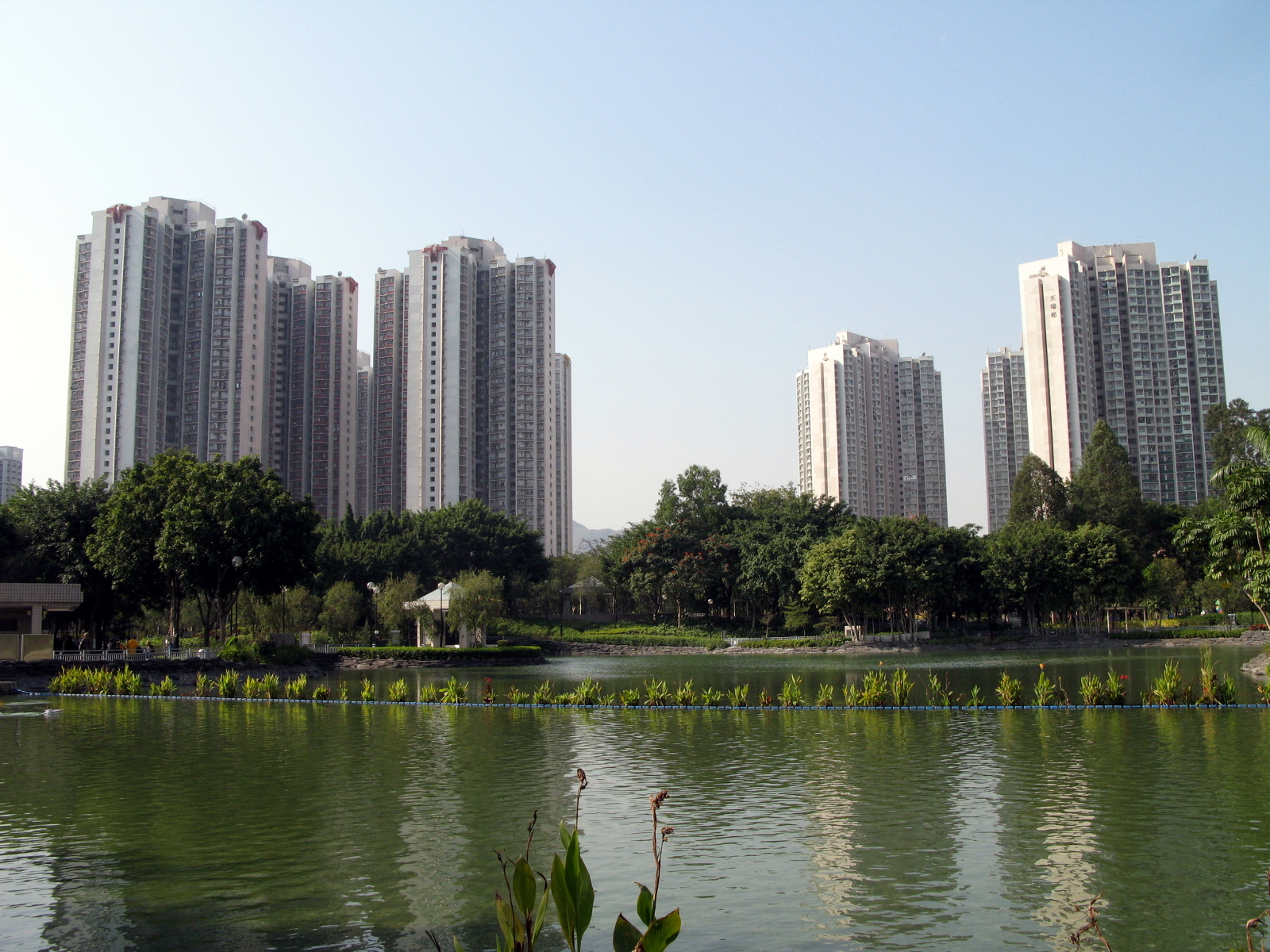
Whole view of Tin Shui Estate

Tin Shui Estate (Chinese: 天瑞邨) is a public housing estate in Tin Shui Wai. It is the second public housing estate in Tin Shui Wai New Town. It is divided into Tin Shui (I) Estate (Chinese: 天瑞(一)邨) and Tin Shui (II) Estate (Chinese: 天瑞(二)邨), and consists of 12 residential buildings completed in 1993.

Name	Type	Completion
Shui Lam House	Harmony 1	1993
Shui Moon House	Harmony 1	1993
Shui Yip House	Harmony 1	1993
Shui Chuen House	Harmony 1	1993
Shui Lung House	Harmony 1	1993
Shui Sing House	Harmony 1	1993
Shui Sum House	Harmony 1	1993
Shui Yee House	Harmony 1	1993
Shui Fai House	Harmony 2	1993
Shui Fung House	Harmony 2	1993
Shui Choi House	Harmony 2	1993
Shui Kwok House	Harmony 2	1993

== Tin Tsz Estate ==
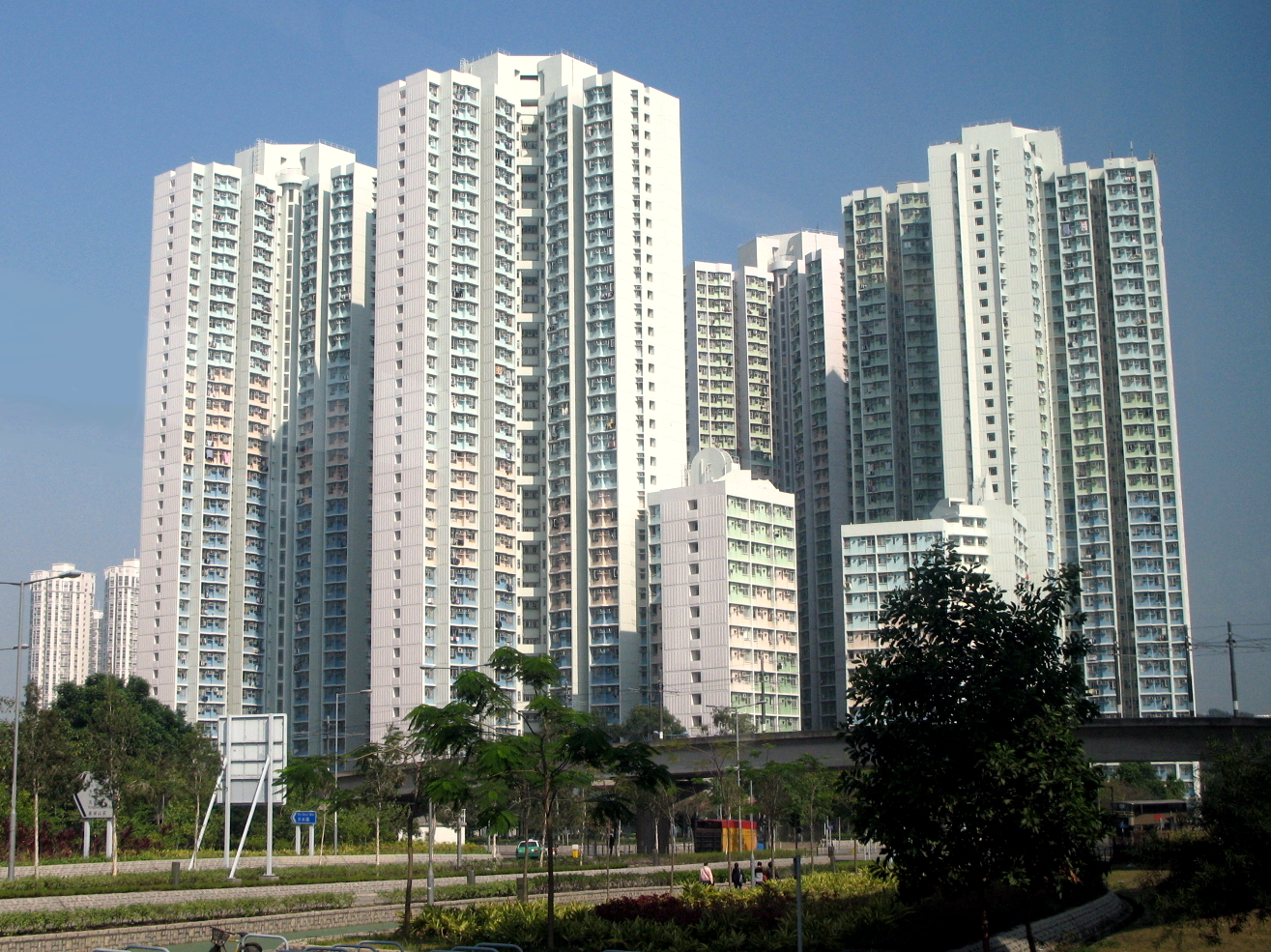
Tin Tsz Estate.

Tin Tsz Estate (Chinese: 天慈邨) is a public housing estate in Tin Shui Wai. It has 4 residential buildings completed in 1997 and contains 3,400 rental flats of sizes ranging from 12.8 to 43.3m^{2}. Its authorized population is 9,400 in 2009.

Name	Type	Completion
Tsz Fai House	Harmony 1	1997
Tsz Ping House	Harmony 1	1997
Tsz Sum House	Harmony 1	1997
Tsz Yan House	Harmony 1	1997

== Tin Wah Estate ==
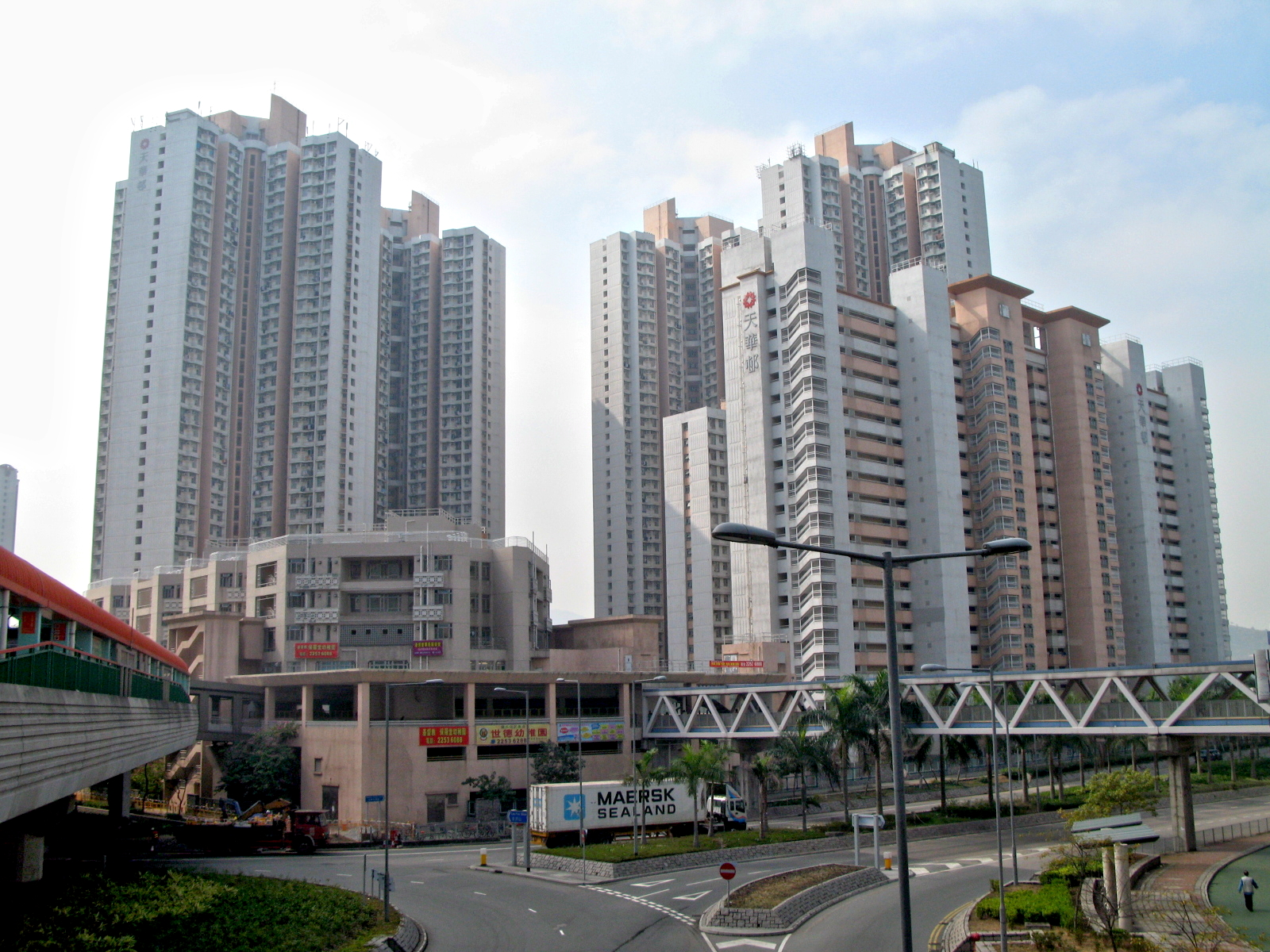
Tin Wah Estate

Tin Wah Estate (Chinese: 天華邨) is a public housing estate in Tin Shui Wai. The estate consists of 7 residential buildings completed in 1999.

Name	Type	Completion
Wah Choi House	Single Aspect Building	1999
Wah Long House	Single Aspect Building	1999
Wah Sui House	Harmony 1	1999
Wah Yuet House	Harmony 1	1999
Wah Yat House	Harmony 1	1999
Wah Yau House	Harmony 1	1999
Ancillary Facilities Block	Non-standard	1999

== Tin Yan Estate ==
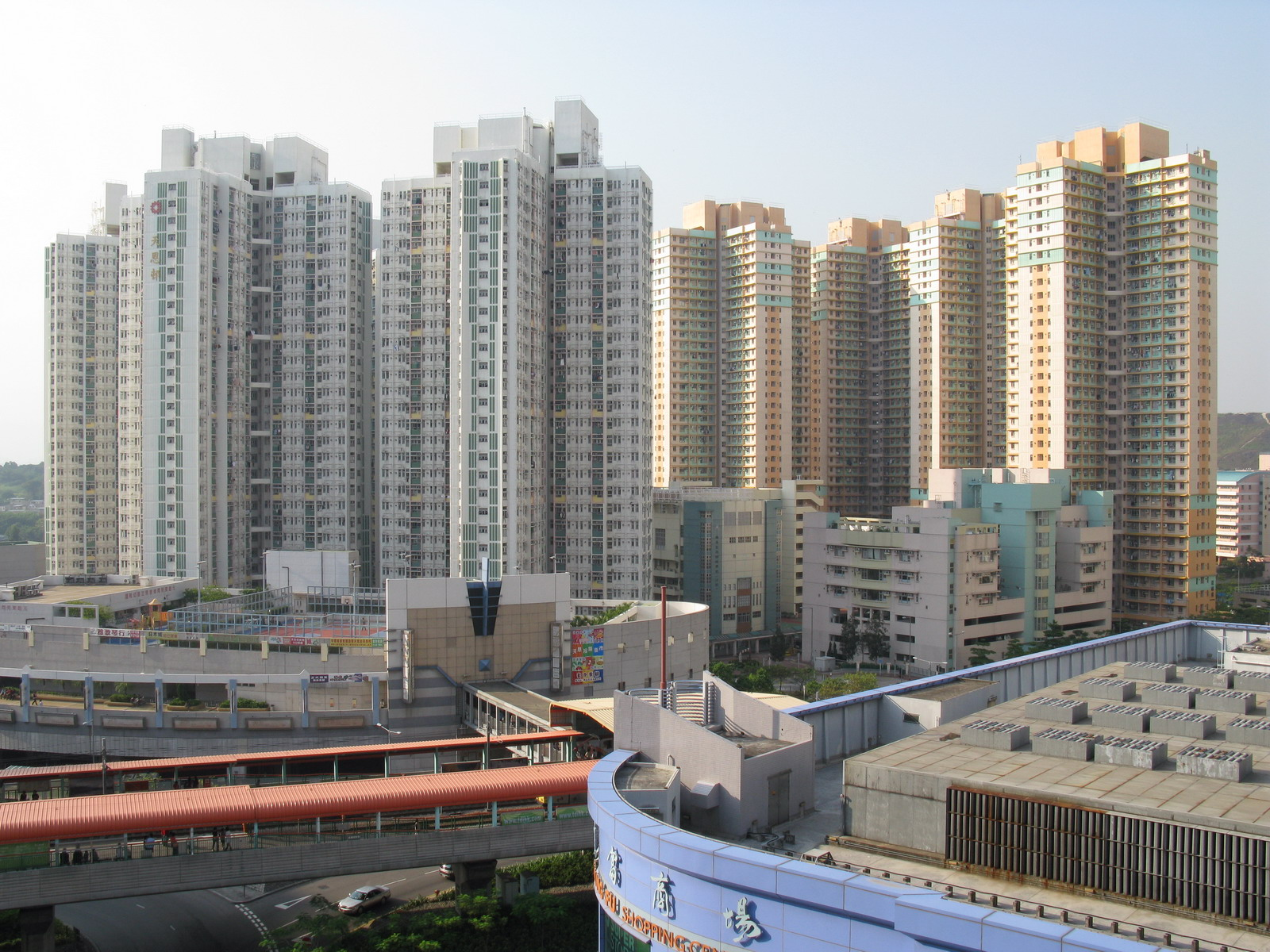
Tin Yan Estate

Tin Yan Estate (Chinese: 天恩邨) is a public housing estate in Tin Shui Wai.

The estate consists of 8 residential buildings completed in 2002 and 2004 respectively. Four of them were originally designed as an Interim Housing estate, but they were renovated to become a public housing estate in 2004. During the SARS outbreak in 2003, Block 2 and 3 were furnished as temporary quarters for frontline healthcare staff.

Name	Type	Completion
Yan Lok House	Non-standard	2002
Yan Ying House	Non-standard	2002
Yan Sui House	Non-standard	2002
Yan Chi House	Non-standard	2002
Yan Fuk House	Non-standard	2004
Yan Chak House	Non-standard	2004
Yan Chui House	Non-standard	2004
Yan Yi House	Non-standard	2004

== Tin Yau Court ==
Tin Yau Court (Chinese: 天祐苑) is a HOS court in Tin Shui Wai, near Tin Yiu Estate. It consists of 3 blocks built in 1992.

Name	Type	Completion
Yau Hong House	Harmony 1	1992
Yau Ning House	Harmony 1	1992
Yau Tai House	Harmony 1	1992

== Tin Yat Estate ==
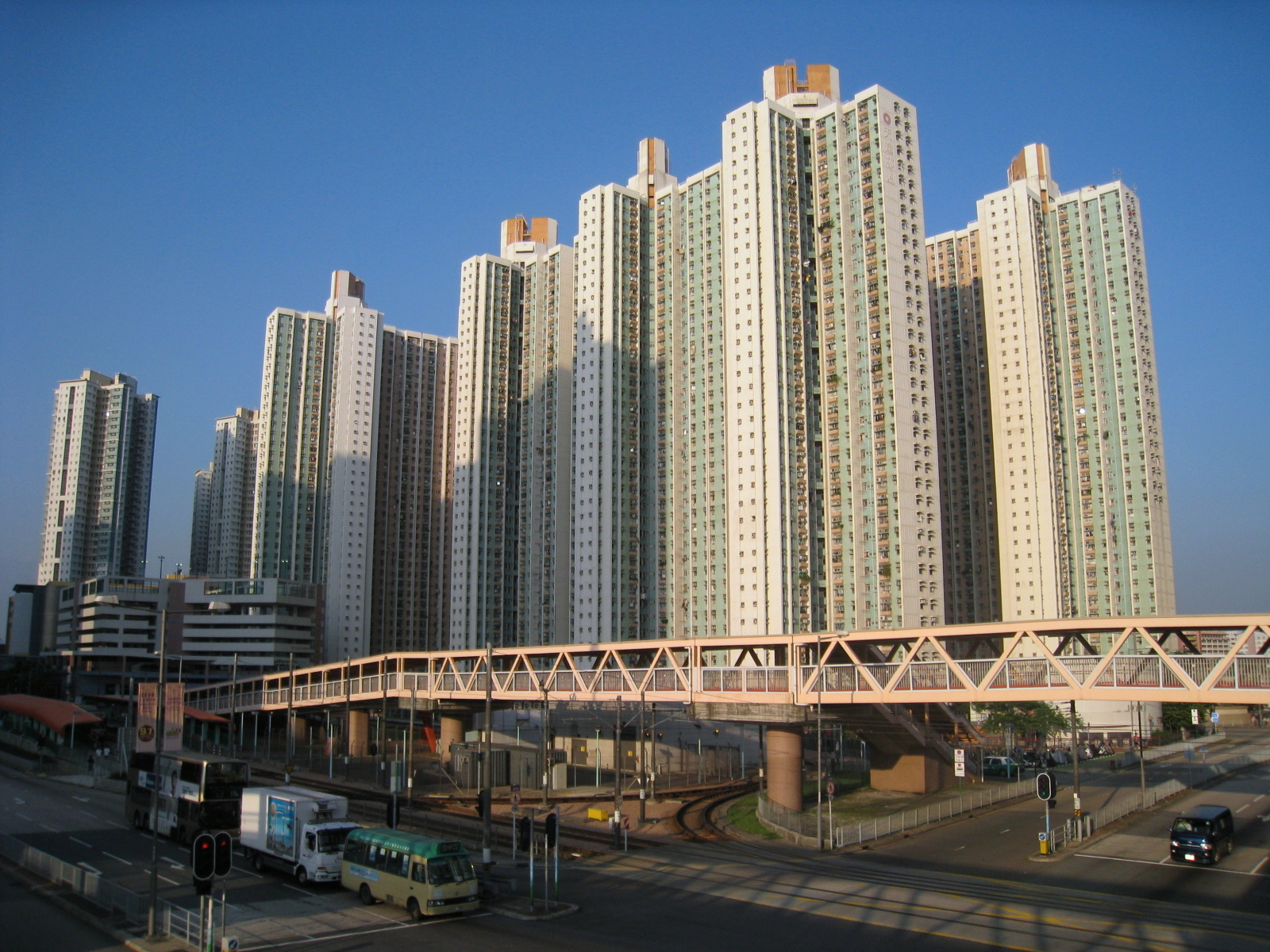
Tin Yat Estate

Tin Yat Estate (Chinese: 天逸邨) is a public housing estate in Tin Shui Wai. It consists of 9 residential buildings completed in 2001.

Name	Type	Completion
Yat Chi House	New Cruciform (Ver.1984)	2001
Yat Hoi House	New Cruciform (Ver.1984)	2001
Yat Kong House	New Cruciform (Ver.1984)	2001
Yat Long House	New Cruciform (Ver.1984)	2001
Yat Wan House	New Cruciform (Ver.1984)	2001
Yat To House	New Cruciform (Ver.1984)	2001
Yat Tam House	New Cruciform (Ver.1984)	2001
Yat Wu House	New Cruciform (Ver.1984)	2001
Yat Yeung House	New Cruciform (Ver.1984)	2001

== Tin Yiu Estate ==
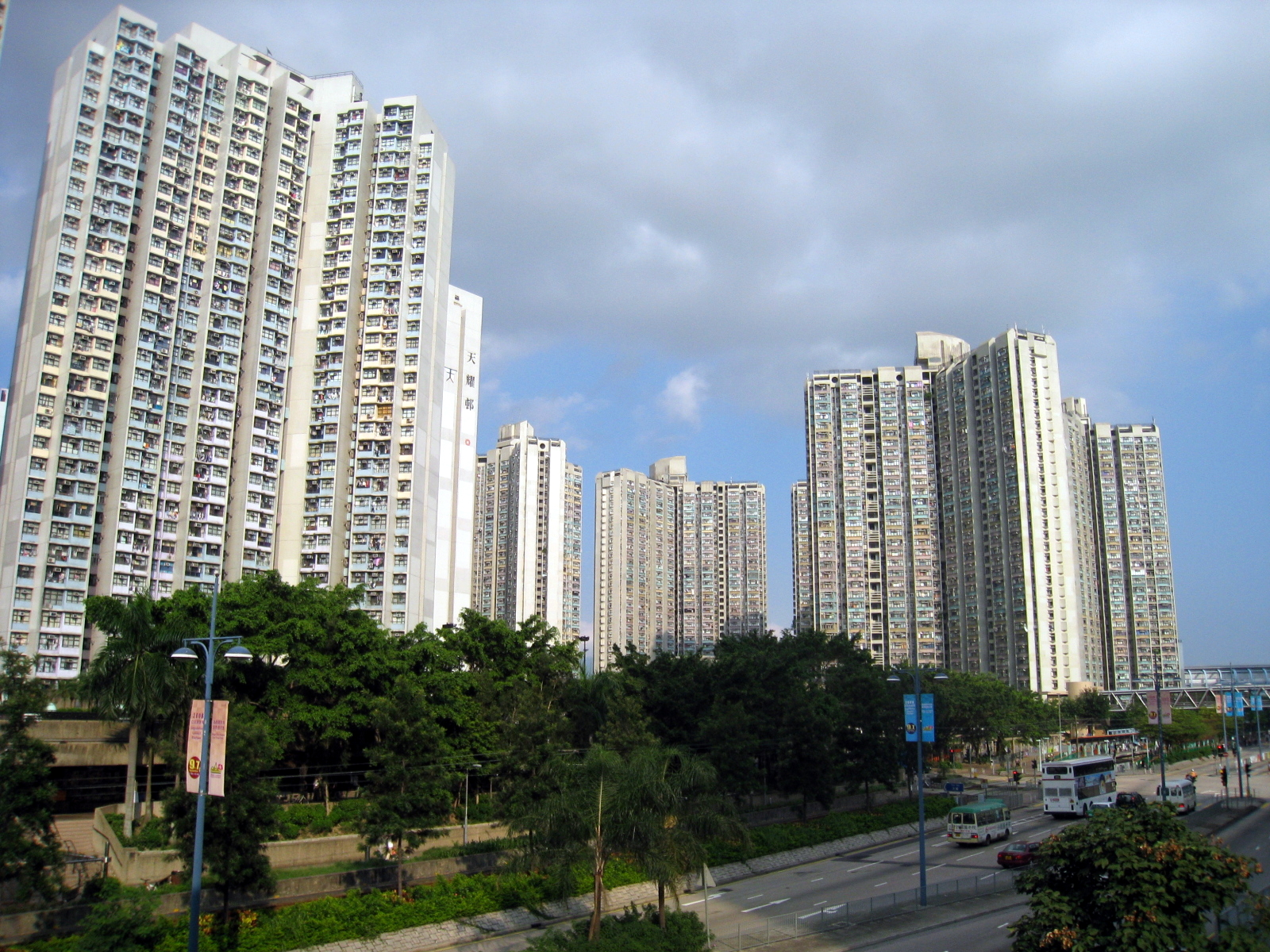
Tin Yiu (I) Estate

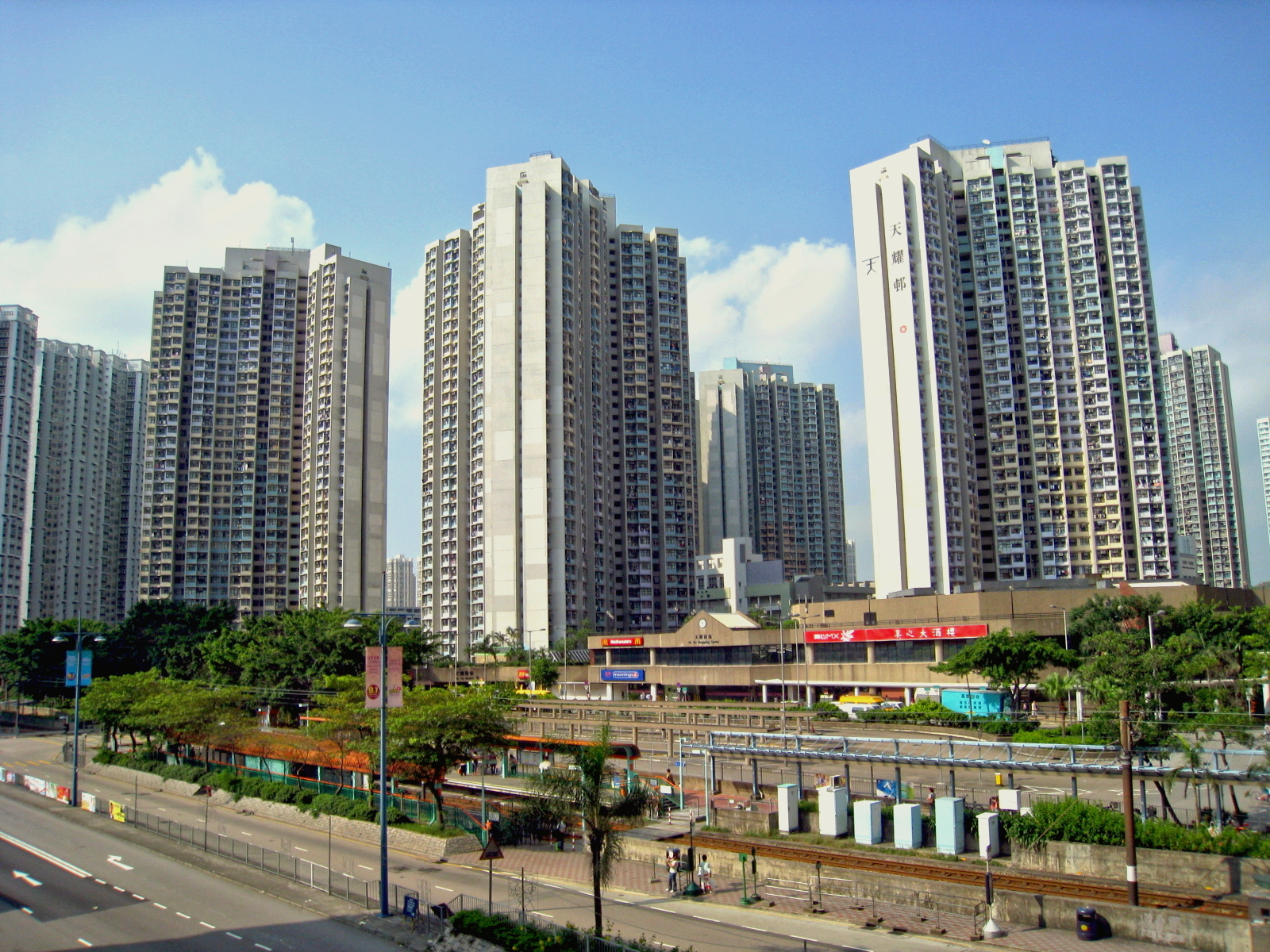
Tin Yiu (II) Estate

Tin Yiu Estate (Chinese: 天耀邨) is a public housing estate in Tin Shui Wai. It is the first public housing estate in Tin Shui Wai New Town. It is divided into Tin Yiu (I) Estate (Chinese: 天耀(一)邨) and Tin Yiu (II) Estate (Chinese: 天耀(二)邨), and consists of 12 residential buildings completed in 1992 and 1993.

Name	Type	Completion
Yiu Yat House	Trident 3	1992
Yiu Man House	Trident 3	1992
Yiu Foo House	Trident 3	1992
Yiu Hing House	Trident 4	1992
Yiu Hong House	Trident 4	1992
Yiu Shing House	Harmony 2	1993
Yiu Chak House	Harmony 2	1993
Yiu Fung House	Harmony 2	1993
Yiu Tai House	Harmony 2	1993
Yiu Wah House	Harmony 2	1993
Yiu Cheong House	Harmony 2	1993
Yiu Lung House	Harmony 2	1993

== Tin Yuet Estate ==
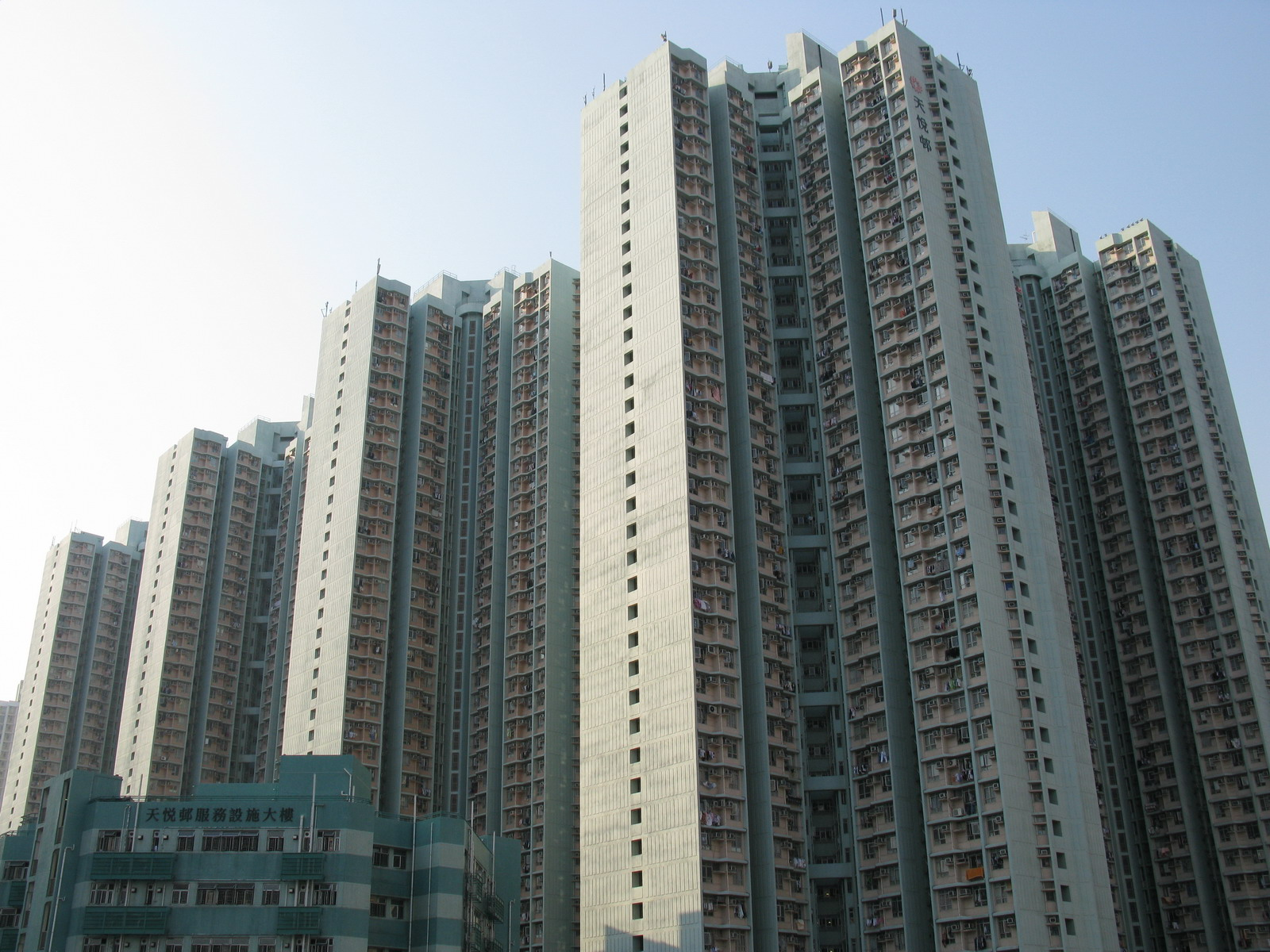
Tin Yuet Estate

Tin Yuet Estate (Chinese: 天悅邨) is a public housing estate in Tin Shui Wai. It consists of 6 residential buildings completed in 2000 and 2002.

Name	Type	Completion
Yuet Wah House	Harmony 1	2000–2002
Yuet Fu House	Harmony 1	2000–2002
Yuet Kwai House	Harmony 1	2000–2002
Yuet Tai House	Harmony 1	2000–2002
Yuet Wing House	Harmony 1	2000–2002
Ancillary Facilities Block	Non-standard	2000–2002

== Grandeur Terrace ==
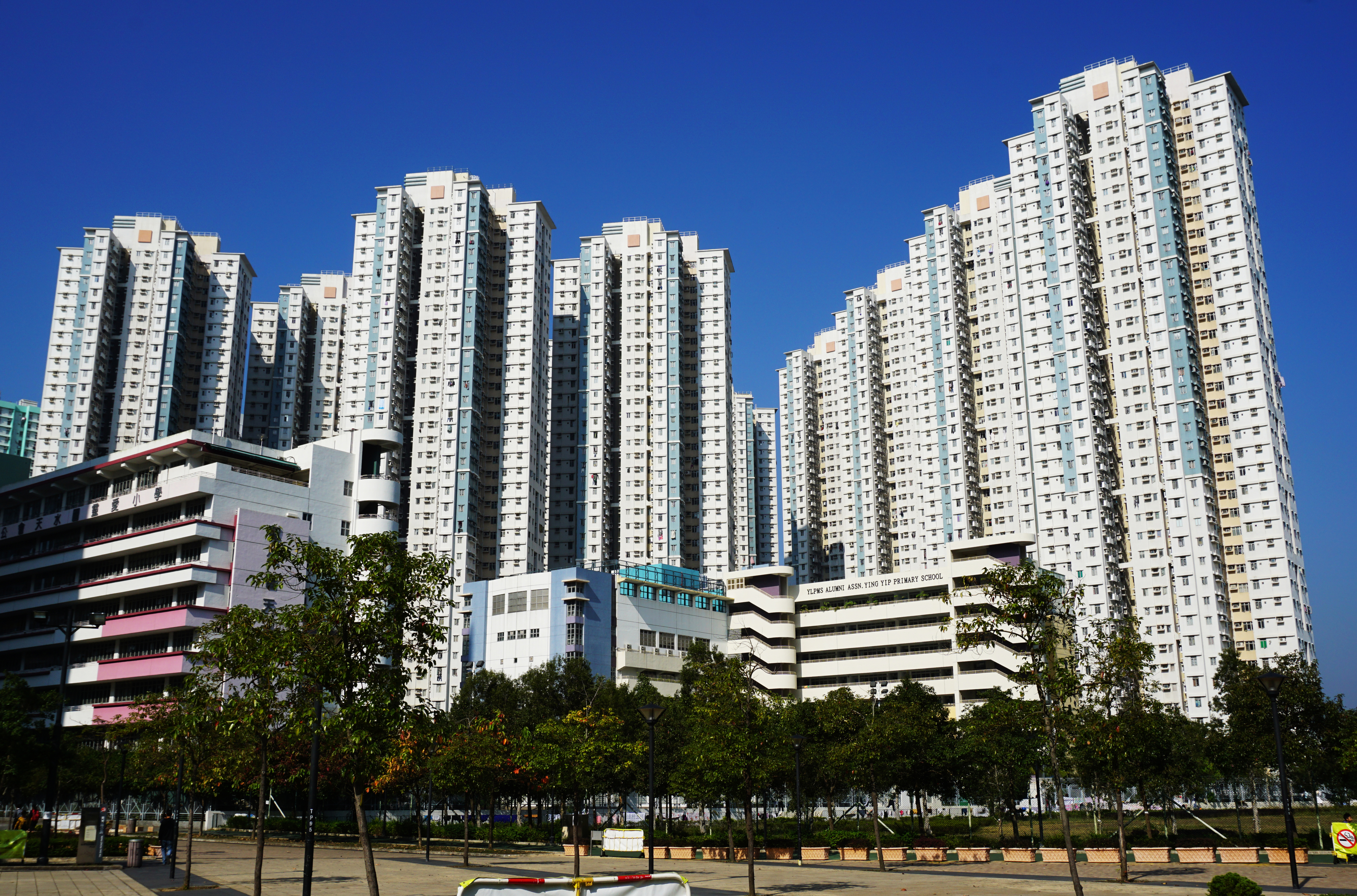
Grandeur Terrace

Grandeur Terrace (Chinese: 俊宏軒) is a public housing estate in Tin Shui Wai. It is the only estate in Tin Shui Wai which its name does not have the prefix "Tin" (Chinese: 天). It was a HOS and PSPS court, and it is the largest PSPS in Hong Kong with 4,100 residential units. It was jointly developed by the Housing Authority and Rich Score Development Ltd, a wholly owned subsidiary of Chun Wo Holdings Limited. It started construction in 2000 and was completed in 2003. When completion, the estate was transferred to public rental housing.

== See also ==
- Public housing in Hong Kong
- Public housing estates in Yuen Long
- List of public housing estates in Hong Kong
