= Transformers Universe =

Transformers Universe may refer to:

- The fictional universe associated with the Transformers franchise
- Transformers Universe (video game), a cancelled massively multiplayer online game
- Transformers Universe (comic book), a number of comic book format series by several publishers
