= Tsz Yau (constituency) =

Constituency of the Yuen Long District Council of Hong Kong

- Elected constituency for the Yuen Long District Council
- Boundary of Tsz Yau in Yuen Long District
- District: Yuen Long
- Legislative Council constituency: New Territories North
- Population: 14,562 (2019)
- Electorate: 9,855 (2019)

Current constituency
- Created: 2003
- Number of members: One
- Member: Vacant

Tsz Yau (Chinese: 慈祐) is one of the 39 constituencies in the Yuen Long District of Hong Kong.

The constituency returns one district councillor to the Yuen Long District Council, with an election every four years. Tsz Yau constituency is loosely based on Tin Lai Court, Tin Tsz Estate and part of Tin Yau Court in Tin Shui Wai with estimated population of 14,562.

== Councillors represented ==
Election	Member	Party
2003	May Chan Mei-lin→Vacant	Nonpartisan

== Election results ==
=== 2010s ===
Yuen Long District Council Election, 2019: Tsz Yau
Party	Candidate	Votes	%	±%
Nonpartisan	May Chan Mei-lin	4,238	64.08	
DAB (NTAS)	Terry So Yuen	2,376	35.92	
Majority		1,862	28.06	
Turnout		6,627	67.29	
Nonpartisan hold		Swing		
