= Tin Tsz Estate =

Public housing estate in Tin Shui Wai, Hong Kong

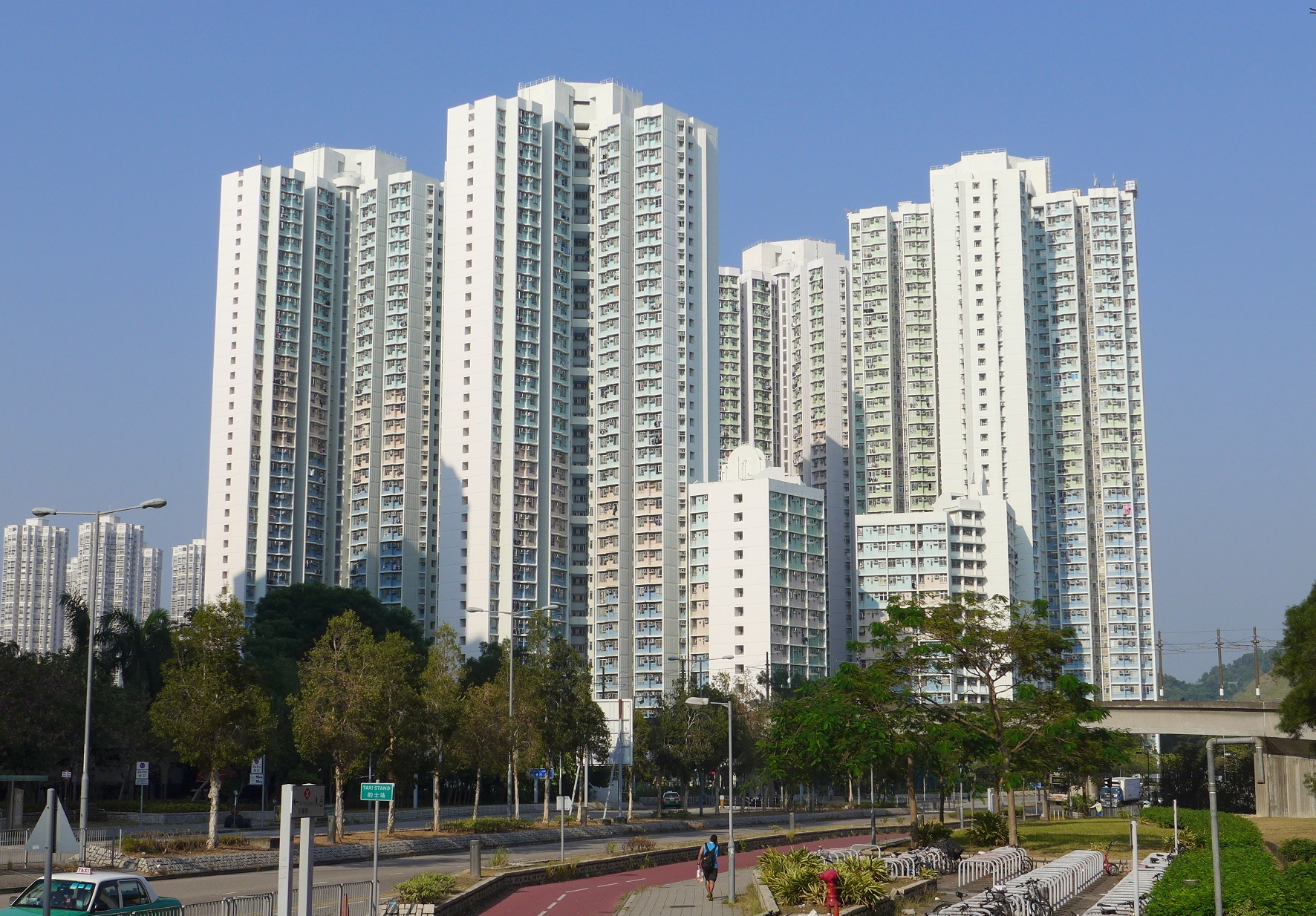
- Tin Tsz Estate
- Interactive map of Tin Tsz Estate

General information
- Location: 9 Tin Hei Street, Tin Shui Wai; New Territories, Hong Kong
- Coordinates: 22.4528213°N 114.0070263°E
- Status: Completed
- Category: Public rental housing
- Population: 9,026 (2016)
- No. of blocks: 4
- No. of units: 3,392

Construction
- Constructed: 1997; 29 years ago
- Authority: Hong Kong Housing Authority

Tin Tsz Estate (Chinese: 天慈邨) is a public housing estate in Tin Shui Wai, New Territories, Hong Kong near Light Rail Tin Tsz stop. It consists of four residential buildings completed in 1997 and contains 3,400 rental flats of sizes ranging from 12.8 to 43.3m^{2}.

Tin Lai Court (Chinese: 天麗苑) is a Home Ownership Scheme court in Tin Shui Wai, near Tin Tsz Estate. It has only one Harmony-typed block built in 1997.

== Houses ==
=== Tin Tsz Estate ===
Name	Chinese name	Building type	Completed
Tsz Fai House	慈輝樓	Harmony 1	1997
Tsz Ping House	慈屏樓	Harmony 1	1997
Tsz Sum House	慈心樓	Harmony 1	1997
Tsz Yan House	慈恩樓	Harmony 1	1997

=== Tin Lai Court ===
Name	Chinese name	Building type	Completed
Tin Lai Court	天麗苑	Harmony 1	1997

== Demographics ==
According to the 2016 by-census, Tin Tsz Estate had a population of 9,026. The median age was 43.4 and the majority of residents (96 per cent) were of Chinese ethnicity. The average household size was 2.8 people. The median monthly household income of all households (i.e. including both economically active and inactive households) was HK$22,000.

== Politics ==
Tin Tsz Estate and Tin Lai Court are located in Tsz Yau constituency of the Yuen Long District Council. It is currently represented by May Chan Mei-lin, who was elected in the 2019 elections.

== See also ==
- Public housing estates in Tin Shui Wai
