= Chung Fu stop =

Light rail stop in Hong Kong

Coordinates: 22°27′43″N 113°59′49″E

Chung Fu 頌富
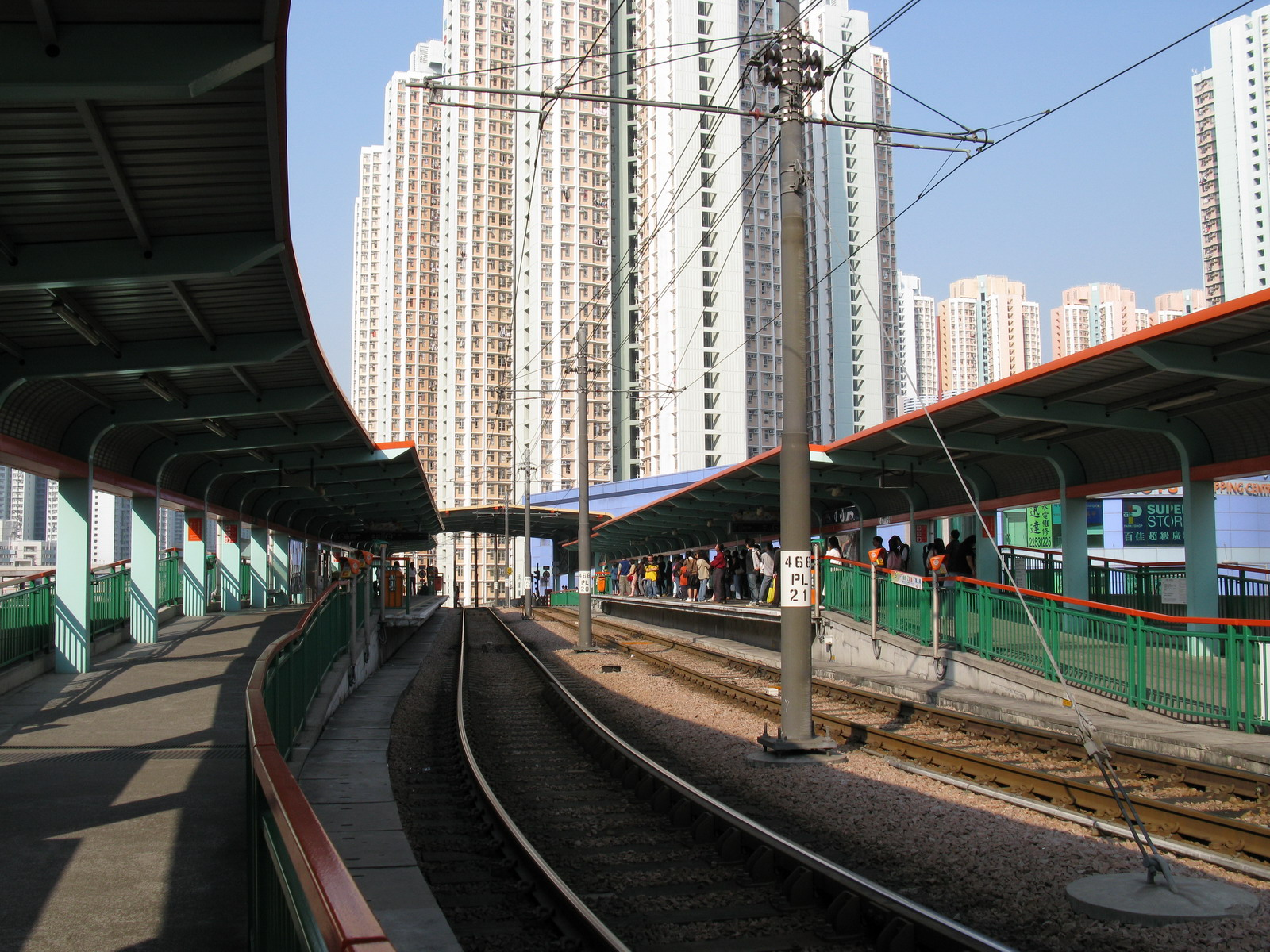
- Chung Fu stop's Platform

General information
- Location: T Town; Hong Kong
- System: MTR Light Rail stop
- Owner: KCR Corporation
- Operator: MTR Corporation
- Line: 705 706 751 751P 761P
- Platforms: 2 side platforms
- Tracks: 2
- Connections: Bus, minibus

Construction
- Structure type: Elevated
- Accessible: yes

Other information
- Station code: CHF (English code); 468 (Digital code)
- Fare zone: 5A

History
- Opened: 7 December 2003; 22 years ago

Services
Preceding stop	MTR Light Rail	Following stop
Tin Shui Anticlockwise around Tin Shui Wai	705	Tin Fu One-way operation
Tin Shui One-way operation	706	Tin Fu Clockwise around Tin Shui Wai
Chestwood towards Yau Oi	751	Tin Fu towards Tin Yat
Chestwood towards Tin Shui Wai	751P Peak hours only	Tin Fu towards Tin Yat
Tin Fu towards Tin Yat	761P	Tin Shui towards Yuen Long
Location
- Location within MTR

Chung Fu (Chinese: 頌富) is an MTR Light Rail stop. It is located above the roundabout of Tin Shui Road and Tin Wah Road, next to T Town, in Tin Shui Wai, Yuen Long District. It is the only elevated Light Rail stop in Tin Shui Wai.The distance between Chung Fu and Tin Fu stop is the shortest in the current Light Rail system. It belongs to Zone 5A and began service on 7 December 2003.
