= Tin Yuet Estate =

Public housing estate in Tin Shui Wai, Hong Kong

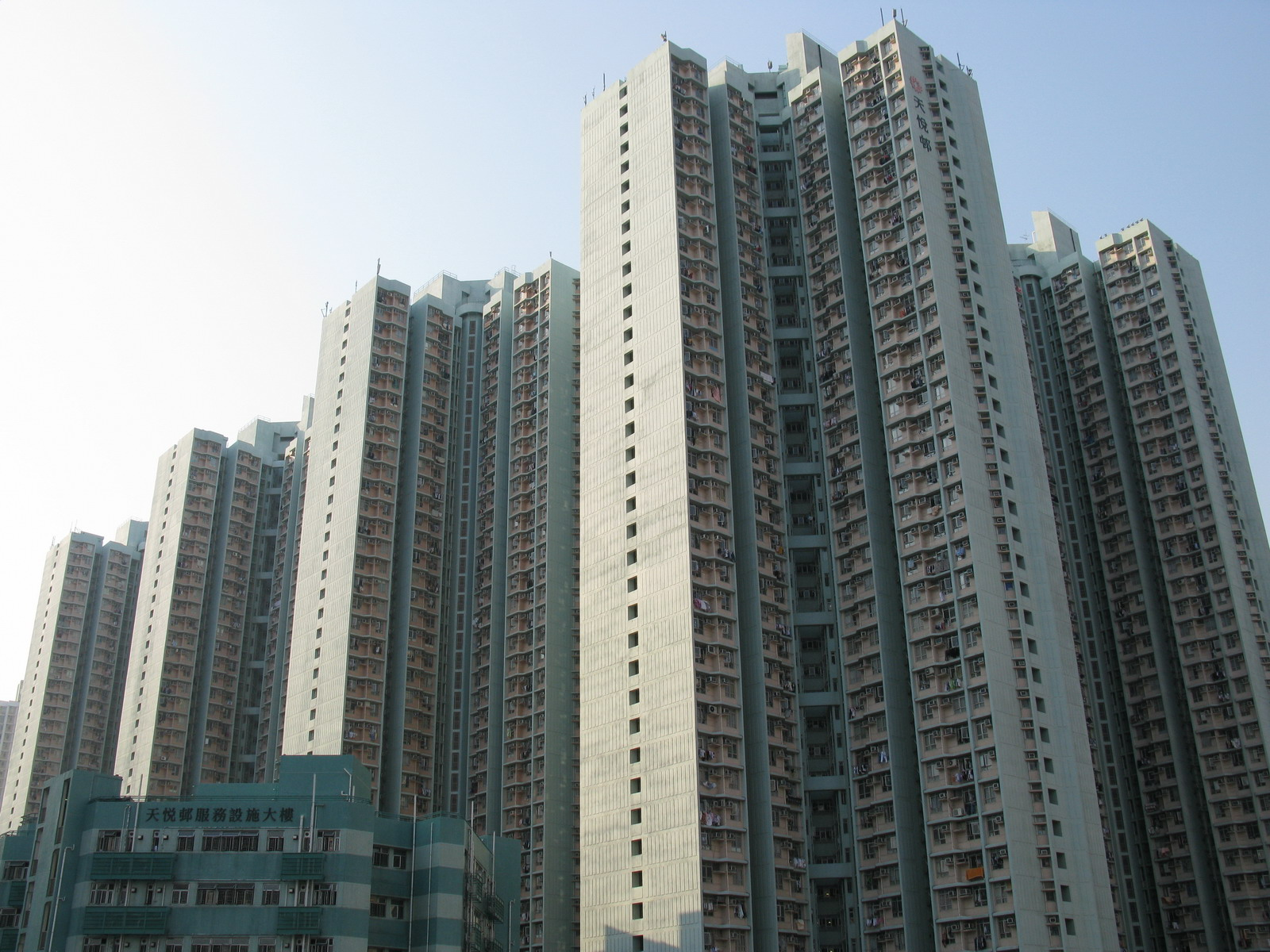
- Tin Yuet Estate
- Interactive map of Tin Yuet Estate

General information
- Location: 39 Tin Wah Road, Tin Shui Wai; New Territories, Hong Kong
- Coordinates: 22.46282°N 114.00004°E
- Status: Completed
- Category: Public rental housing
- Population: 11,811 (2016)
- No. of blocks: 6
- No. of units: 4,192

Construction
- Constructed: 2000; 26 years ago
- Authority: Hong Kong Housing Authority

Tin Yuet Estate (Chinese: 天悅邨) is a public housing estate in Tin Shui Wai, New Territories, Hong Kong, near Light Rail Tin Yuet stop. It consists of six residential buildings completed in 2000 and 2002 respectively.

== Houses ==
Name	Chinese name	Building type	Completed
Yuet Fu House	悅富樓	Harmony 1	2000
Yuet Kwai House	悅貴樓	Harmony 1	2000
Yuet Wing House	悅榮樓	Harmony 1	2002
Yuet Wah House	悅華樓	Harmony 1	2002
Yuet Tai House	悅泰樓	Harmony 1	2002
Ancillary Facilities Block	服務設施大樓	Non-standard	2002

== Demographics ==
According to the 2016 by-census, Tin Yuet Estate had a population of 11,811. The median age was 40.8 and the majority of residents (96.4 per cent) were of Chinese ethnicity. The average household size was 3 people. The median monthly household income of all households (i.e. including both economically active and inactive households) was HK$23,150.

== Politics ==
Tin Yuet Estate is located in Yuet Yan constituency of the Yuen Long District Council. It was formerly represented by Hong Chin-wah, who was elected in the 2019 elections until July 2021.

== See also ==
- Public housing estates in Tin Shui Wai
