= Tin Yuet stop =

Light rail stop in Hong Kong

Coordinates: 22°27′46″N 114°00′06″E

Tin Yuet 天悅
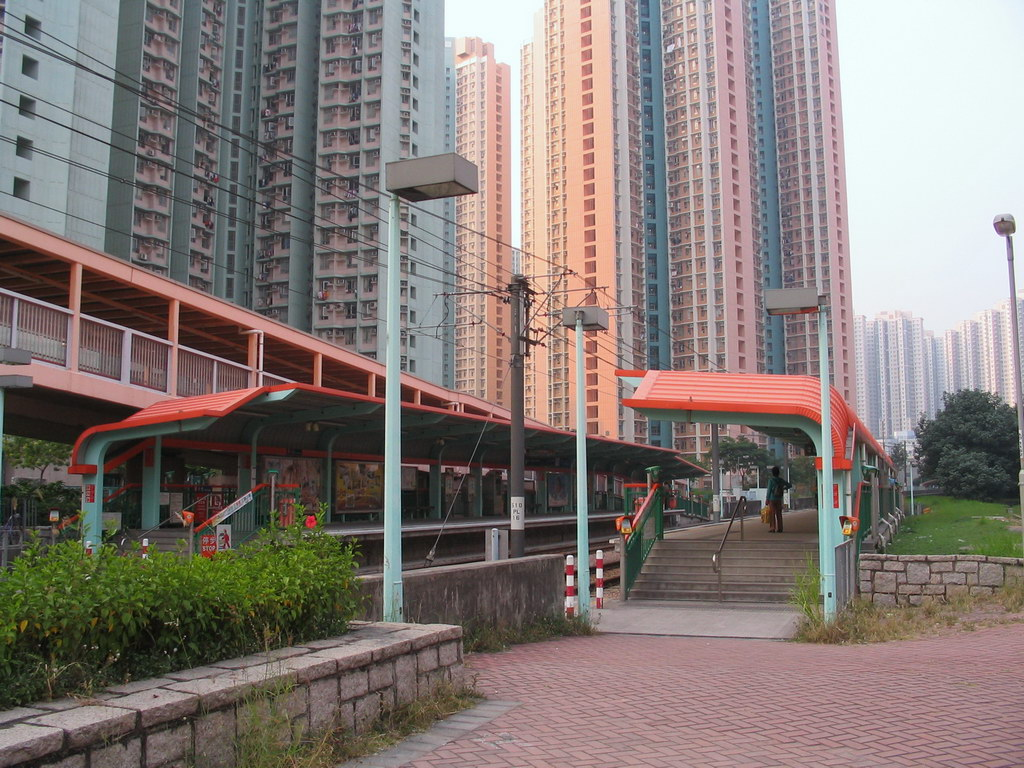
- Appearance of Tin Yuet stop

General information
- Location: Tin Yuet Estate; Hong Kong
- System: MTR Light Rail stop
- Owner: KCR Corporation
- Operator: MTR Corporation
- Line: 705 706
- Platforms: 2 side platforms
- Tracks: 2
- Connections: Bus, minibus

Construction
- Structure type: At-grade
- Accessible: yes

Other information
- Station code: TYU (English code); 510 (Digital code)
- Fare zone: 5A

History
- Opened: 7 December 2003; 22 years ago

Services
Preceding stop	MTR Light Rail	Following stop
Tin Sau Anticlockwise around Tin Shui Wai	705	Tin Wing One-way operation
Tin Sau One-way operation	706	Tin Wing Clockwise around Tin Shui Wai
Location
- Location within MTR

Tin Yuet (Chinese: 天悅) is an MTR Light Rail stop. It is located at ground level at the centre of Tin Shing Road, between Tin Yuet Estate and Tin Ching Estate, in Tin Shui Wai, Yuen Long District. It began service on 7 December 2003 and belongs to Zone 5A. It serves Tin Yuet Estate and Tin Ching Estate.
