= Tin Fu stop =

Light rail stop in Hong Kong

Coordinates: 22°27′55″N 113°59′52″E

Tin Fu 天富
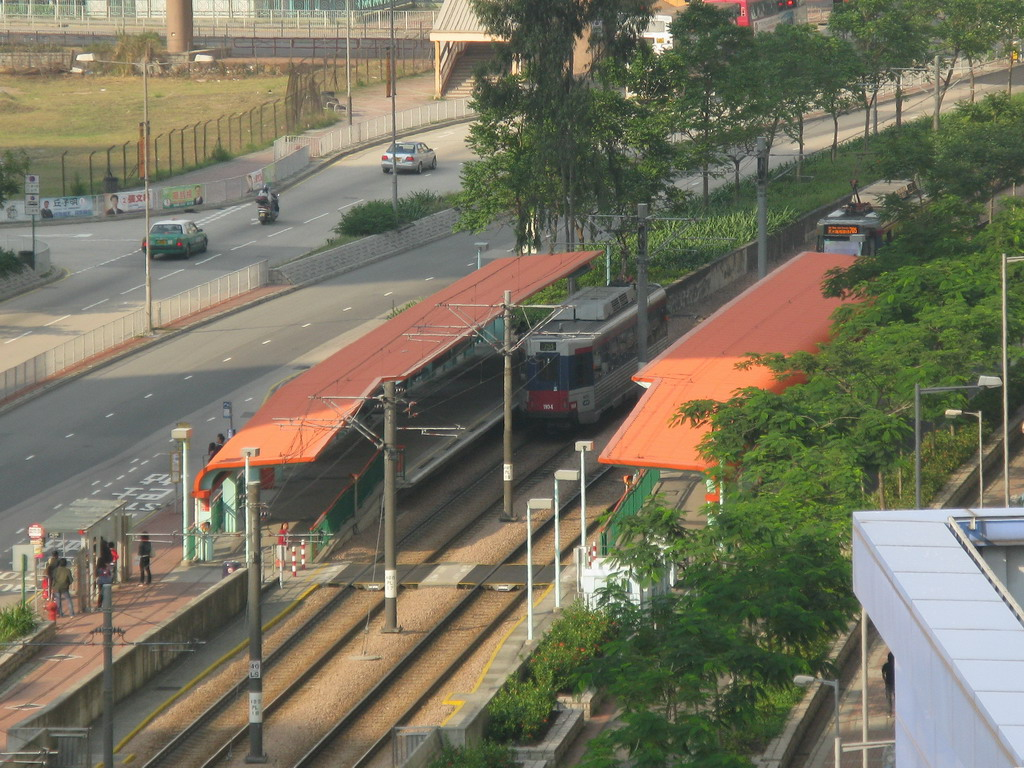
- Appearance of Tin Fu stop

General information
- Location: Tin Fu Court; Hong Kong
- System: MTR Light Rail stop
- Owner: KCR Corporation
- Operator: MTR Corporation
- Line: 705 706 751 751P 761P
- Platforms: 2 side platforms
- Tracks: 2
- Connections: Bus, minibus

Construction
- Structure type: At-grade
- Accessible: yes

Other information
- Station code: TFU (English code); 480 (Digital code)
- Fare zone: 5A

History
- Opened: 7 December 2003; 22 years ago

Services
Preceding stop	MTR Light Rail	Following stop
Chung Fu Anticlockwise around Tin Shui Wai	705	Tin Yat One-way operation
Chung Fu One-way operation	706	Tin Yat Clockwise around Tin Shui Wai
Chung Fu towards Yau Oi	751	Tin Yat Terminus
Chung Fu towards Tin Shui Wai	751P Peak hours only	Tin Yat Terminus
Tin Yat Terminus	761P	Chung Fu towards Yuen Long
Location
- Location within MTR

Tin Fu (Chinese: 天富) is an MTR Light Rail stop. It is located at the ground of Tin Shui Road, next to Tin Fu Court, in Tin Shui Wai, Yuen Long District. The distance between it and Chung Fu stop is the shortest in the current Light Rail system. It began service on 7 December 2003 and belongs to Zone 5A.
