= West Rail line =

Hong Kong railway line (2003–2021)

West Rail line 西鐵綫
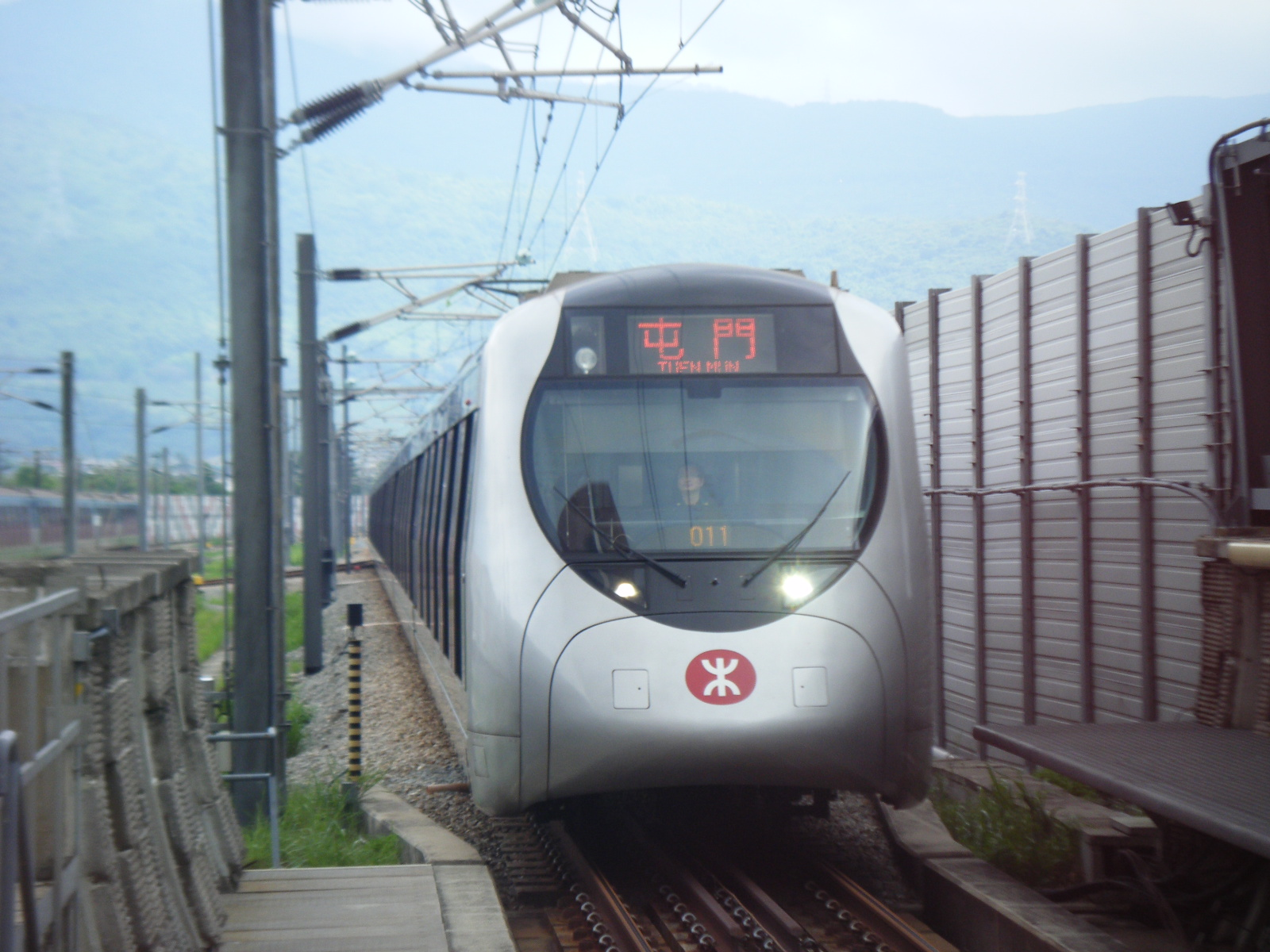
- A West Rail line IKK train arriving at Kam Sheung Road station in June 2008

Overview
- Status: Merged with the Ma On Shan line into Tuen Ma line (27 June 2021)
- Owner: Kowloon-Canton Railway Corporation
- Locale: Districts: Yau Tsim Mong, Sham Shui Po, Kwai Tsing (no station), Tsuen Wan, Yuen Long, Tuen Mun
- Termini: Tuen Mun; Hung Hom
- Continues as: Tuen Ma line
- Former connections: East Rail line; Tung Chung line; Airport Express; Tsuen Wan line; Light Rail
- Stations: 12
- Color on map: Magenta (#A3238F)

Service
- Type: Commuter rail / Rapid transit
- System: MTR
- Operator: MTR Corporation
- Depot: Pat Heung
- Rolling stock: SP1900/1950 EMU; CRRC Changchun C1141A EMU
- Ridership: 442,600 weekday average (Sept to Oct 2014)

History
- Opened: 20 December 2003
- Closed: 27 June 2021 (merged with the Ma On Shan line to form the Tuen Ma line)

Technical
- Line length: 35.7 km (22.2 mi)
- Track gauge: 1,435 mm (4 ft 8 1/2 in)
- Electrification: 25 kV 50 Hz AC (Overhead lines)
- Operating speed: 130 km/h (81 mph)
Route map

West Rail line
- Traditional Chinese: 西鐵綫
- Simplified Chinese: 西铁线
- Literal meaning: West Rail line
Transcriptions
Standard Mandarin
- Hanyu Pinyin: Xī Tiě Xiàn
Yue: Cantonese
- Yale Romanization: Sāi Tit Sin
- Jyutping: Sai1 Tit3 Sin3

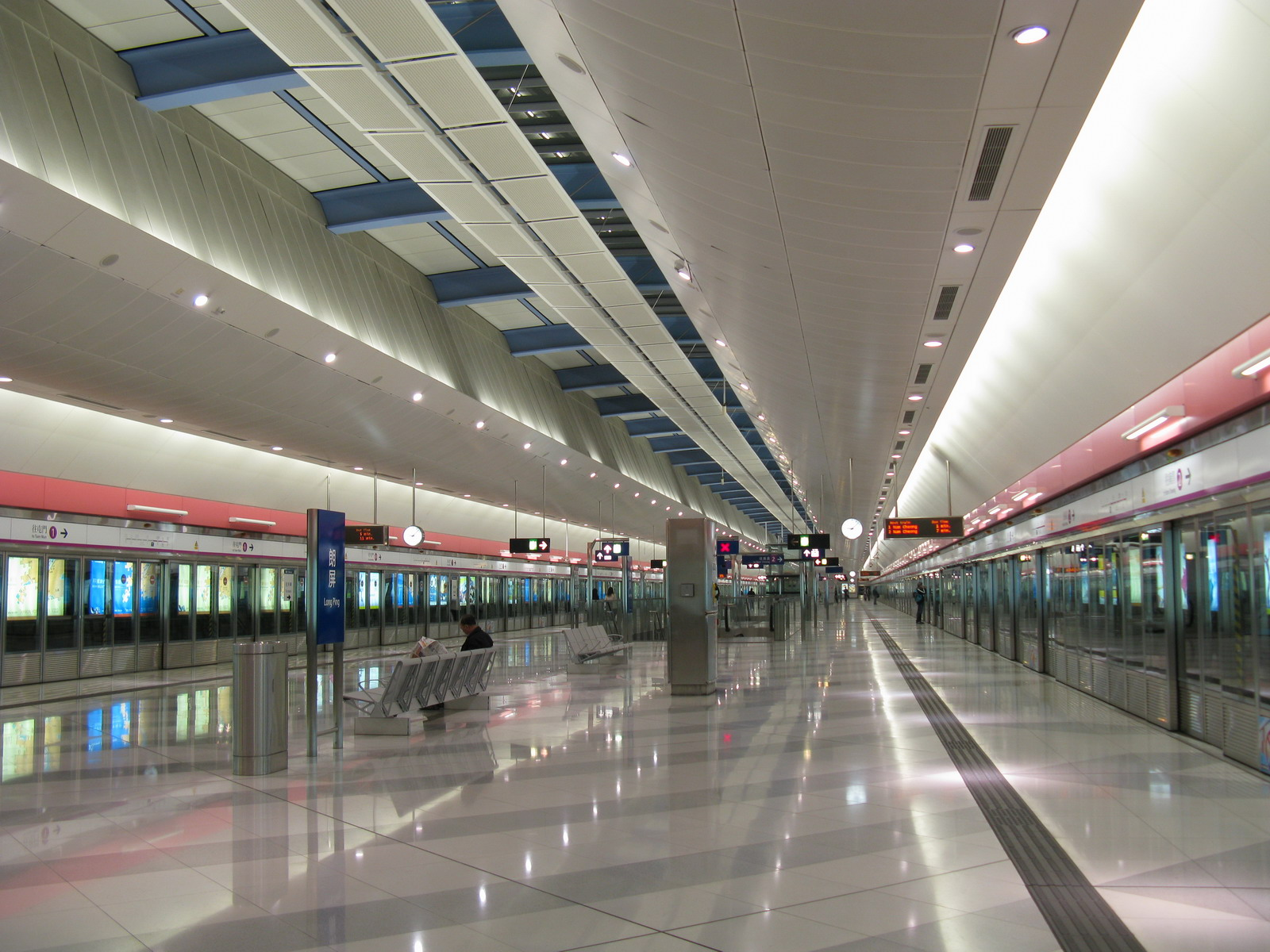
Long Ping station platform in December 2008

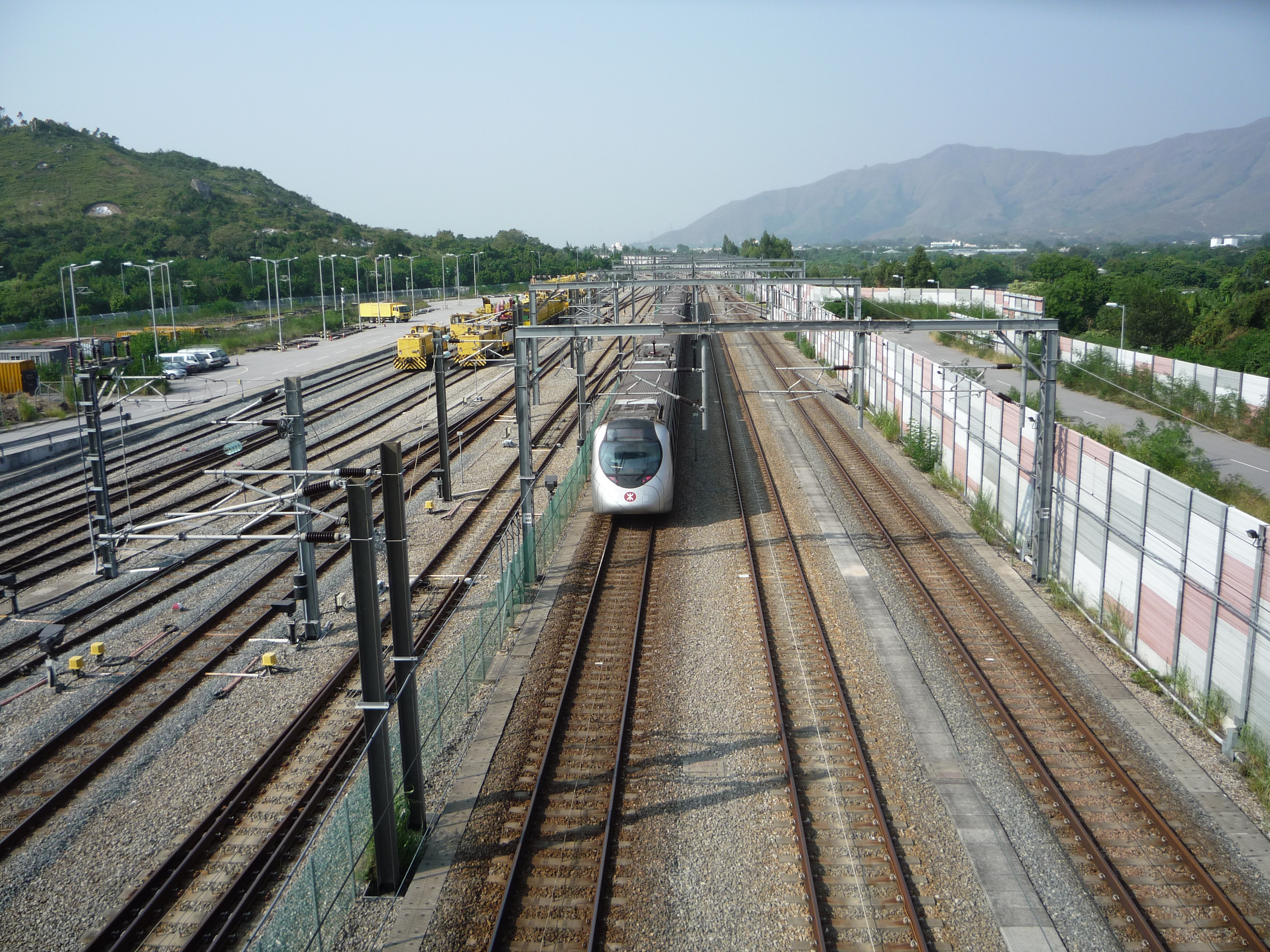
West Rail line Pat Heung Section in November 2009

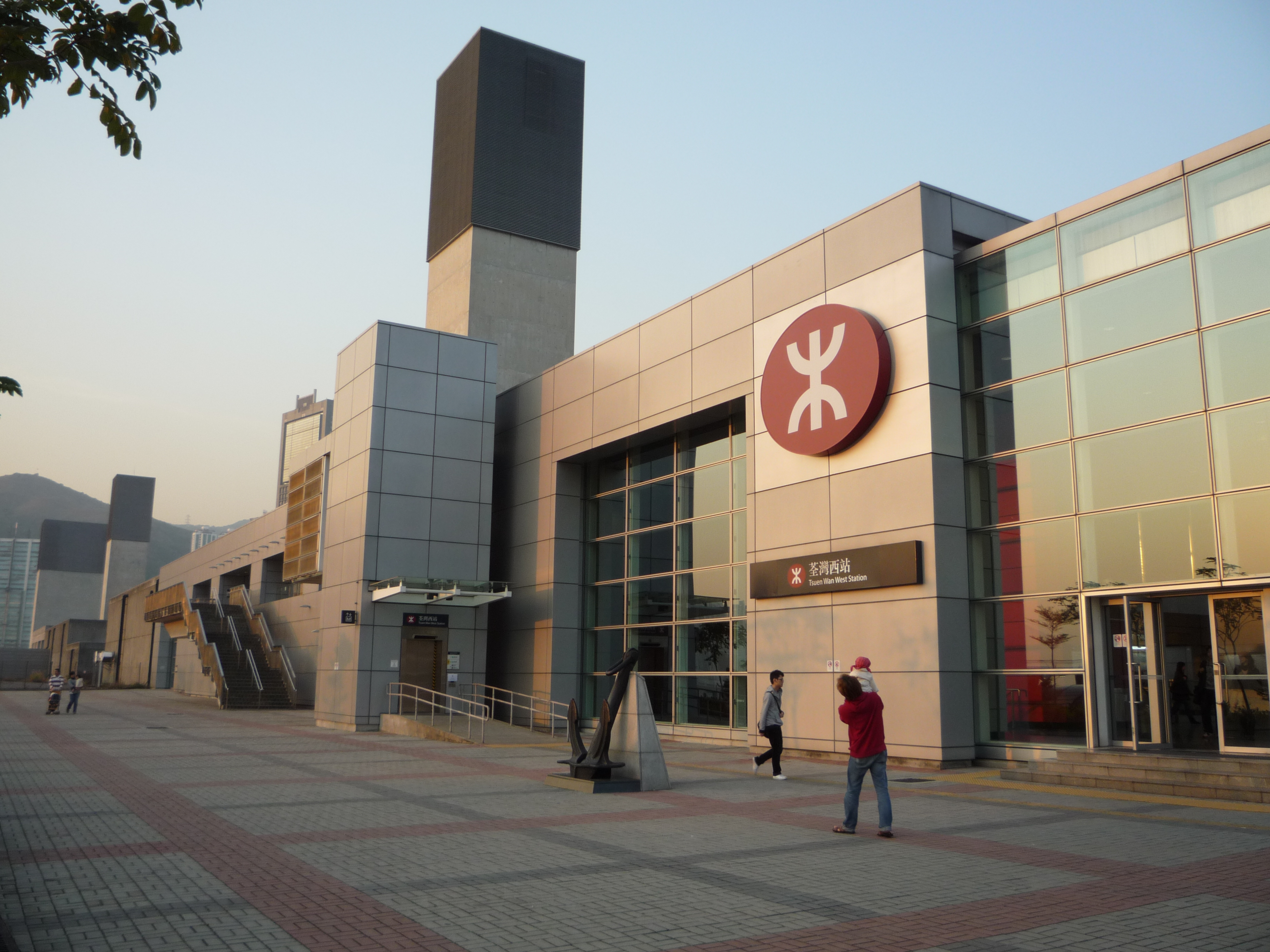
Appearance of Tsuen Wan West station in January 2010

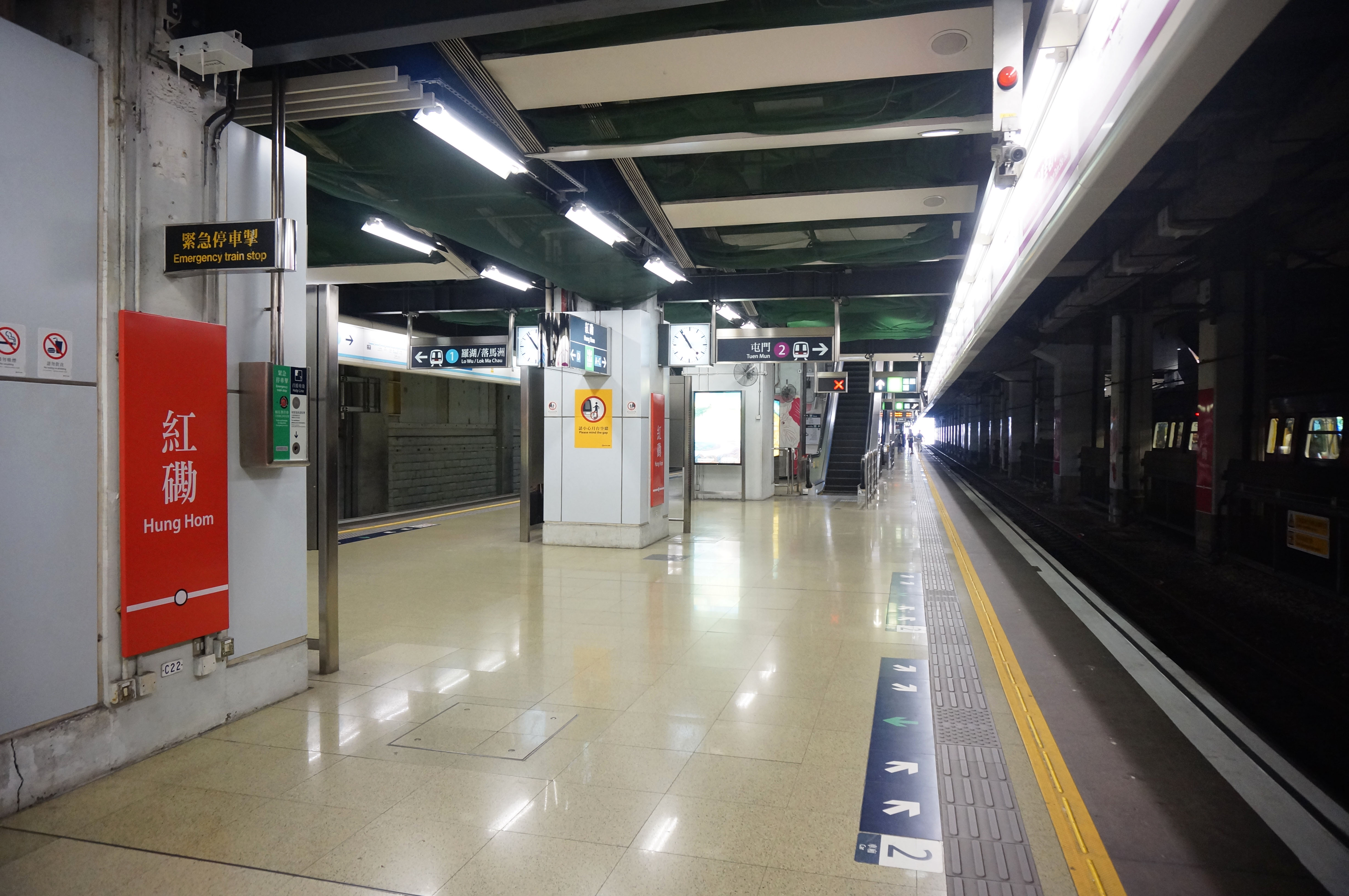
Hung Hom station Platform 2 in April 2014

The West Rail line (Chinese: 西鐵綫) (formerly known as KCR West Rail from 20 December 2003 to 2 December 2007) was a commuter rail / rapid transit line that formed part of the Mass Transit Railway (MTR) system in Hong Kong until 27 June 2021. Coloured magenta on the MTR map, the line ran from Tuen Mun to Hung Hom, with a total length of 35.7 kilometres (22.2 mi), in 37 minutes. The railway connected the urban area of Kowloon and the new towns of Yuen Long, Tin Shui Wai and Tuen Mun in the northwestern New Territories.

The line was the second of three lines built and operated by the Kowloon-Canton Railway Corporation (KCRC), then known as the KCR West Rail (九廣西鐵). It was designed to suburban rail standards similar to that of KCR's first line, now the East Rail line, anticipating freight and intercity services to mainland China, although the latter role was ultimately superseded by the Guangzhou–Shenzhen–Hong Kong Express Rail Link Hong Kong section as part of the China Railway High-speed network.

After KCRC's merger of operations with the MTR Corporation on 2 December 2007, the West Rail line was operated as part of the MTR network. Along with the Ma On Shan line, the line was integrated into the Tuen Ma line in June 2021 upon the completion of Phase 1 of the Sha Tin to Central Link.

== History ==
=== Planning ===
A railway to the northwestern New Territories from the urban area in Kowloon was recommended as early as 1978 in a Tuen Mun Transport Study by Scott Wilson Kirkpatrick & Partner; by the early 1990s, the surge of commuter towns in Yuen Long and Tuen Mun had frequently brought road networks to a standstill, as urban populations spilled over to the bedroom communities while keeping their jobs in Kowloon and Hong Kong Island.

The 1994 Hong Kong Government Railway Development Strategy report envisaged a domestic passenger service between the Northwestern New Territories (NWNT) and urban Kowloon, a cross-boundary passenger service for passengers travelling between Hong Kong and mainland China, and container freight transport between ports in mainland China and Hong Kong.

In January 1995, the Government invited the Kowloon-Canton Railway Corporation (KCRC) to submit a proposal for the design, construction and operation of the proposed Western Corridor Railway. KCRC submitted a full proposal in November 1995, as did MTRC; twelve months later, the Government adopted KCRC's proposal. Tuen Mun residents clamoured for a direct connection (or failing that, a costly alternative coastal alignment), and the terminus was duly extended along Tuen Mun Nullah. Along with the Light Rail network, which was reconfigured as a feeder system, the new railway was designed to serve 1.08 million residents in northwestern New Territories, 25% of whom lived within walking distance to stations compared to 80% along the Tseung Kwan O line.^{p. 39}

In August 1996, the KCR Corporation set up the West Rail Steering Committee to oversee all aspects of the project. Originally conceived and carried through to the technical design phase as a 12-car system, paralleling the KCRC-operated East Rail line, the West Rail project was re-evaluated by the KCRC in autumn of 1998; the present nine-car capacity (of which trains of eight-cars are currently run) is a result of improved ultimate headway from 120 seconds to 90.

The first phase of construction included a double-track commuter railway connecting Tuen Mun station and Nam Cheong station in newly reclaimed West Kowloon, at a cost of HK$46.4 billion in 2002 prices which was some 28% lower than the original estimate in 1998; later reports cite $51.7 billion in money of the day prices.

=== Initial operation ===
Originally, the KCRC expected the West Rail to have a daily ridership of about 340,000 upon commissioning and 500,000 by 2011. Actual figures hovered around 100,000 by April 2004, however, and rose to 170,000 by the end of the year following a series of discounts. Frequent breakdowns (by local standards: 24 incidents in 2004 caused a delay of eight minutes or more) led KCRC Chairman Michael Tien to announce that he would consider resigning if service performance failed to improve.

Some 30,000 flats were originally planned to be built along the route between 2006 and 2011, only to be put on hold when the property market crashed. The commuter line was built after the new towns in north-west New Territories, along with road-based transport networks, were nearing completion. Attempts to boost patronage were made by cutting longstanding bus services, which in turn necessitated government compensation to private bus operator Kowloon Motor Bus.

=== Kowloon Southern Link ===
On 16 August 2009, the Kowloon Southern Link from Nam Cheong to East Tsim Sha Tsui station was opened. At the same time, the existing segment between East Tsim Sha Tsui station and Hung Hom station was transferred from the East Rail line to the West Rail line, and both services now terminated in the south and interchanged at Hung Hom.

== Route ==
Like all MTR lines, the West Rail line is grade-separated throughout its entire length and includes a combination of underground, at-grade, and elevated sections. Running from southeast to northwest, it starts at Hung Hom station at ground level and initially heads southwest into a tunnel and descending underground through East Tsim Sha Tsui and Austin stations (the former having originally being served by the East Rail line, and the track heading northwards through the latter), before returning to ground level (though still fully covered) at Nam Cheong station. The track then runs northwest through a sealed box tunnel just to the north to and under the West Kowloon Highway through Lai Chi Kok Park into Mei Foo station, which has a ground-level/underground hybrid design. Bored tunnels traverse densely populated Kwai Chung and under the Tsuen Wan line towards Tsuen Wan West station on reclaimed land, after which a 5.5 km (3.4 mi) bored rock tunnel, the Tai Lam Tunnel, takes trains through Tai Lam Country Park.

The line emerges into open air just south of the train depot at Pat Heung and initially runs at-grade, and later on an embankment, as it approaches Kam Sheung Road station. The rest of the line is fully elevated and constructed on a continuous viaduct, running in a westerly direction through the new towns of Yuen Long and turning towards the south at Tin Shui Wai, before taking a bend towards the Tuen Mun River and eventually terminating at Tuen Mun station.

== Capacity and ridership ==
=== Rolling stock and technology ===
The West Rail line was served by 33 eight-car MTR SP1900 EMUs built by a Japanese consortium of Kinki Sharyo and Kawasaki Heavy Industries, of which 22 were originally ordered by KCRC as seven-car trains for the initial opening of the line (the same model was ordered in 12-car and 4-car variants for the East Rail and the original Ma On Shan line, respectively). Up to 26 sets run during the morning peak service with a 171-second headway; MTRC specifies capacities of 52 seated and 286 standing passengers per car.

In March 2020, a newly built eight-car East West line train, manufactured by CRRC Changchun Railway Vehicles, entered service on the line. Similar to the previous rolling stock, the trains had a maximum running speed of 130 kilometres per hour (81 mph) and travel at an average speed of 56 kilometres per hour (35 mph) on the West Rail line. Unlike the trains on the East Rail line, there are no first-class compartments. All trains are serviced at Pat Heung depot and are equipped with the SelTrac IS moving block signalling system for train protection; this was among the earliest applications of the technology on a high-capacity, heavy-rail line worldwide.

Beginning in January 2016, all 7-car trains were converted to 8-car trains in anticipation of the Sha Tin to Central Link (see § Future development); this was completed in May 2018. During the transition period with both 7-car and 8-car trains in service, passengers had to pay attention to the platform LCD screens and announcements to queue at the right part of the platforms.

=== Theoretical capacity ===
The line increased capacity between the northwest New Territories and urban areas by about 80%, and on the Tuen Mun-Yuen Long Corridor by about 200%. Crowding on trains–or a lack thereof–has been a matter of heated public debate since its inauguration, as the government has no specific indicator for measuring crowdedness in train compartments as of 2014.

Japanese train manufacturer Kinki Sharyo quoted car capacities (standing plus seating) upward of 430 for cab cars and 452 for the rest. KCRC's stress tests prior to the system's début specified a crush-load capacity of 2345, or 335 passengers in longitudinal seating for each of its seven cars, which corresponds to seven passengers per square metre in line with MTRC standards. This contrasts with a worst-case allowable planning standard of 5 pax/square metre in the United States.

In industry journals, KCRC engineers and academics quoted ultimate limits upwards of 100,000 under 105-second headways, in nine-car configuration; however, both post-merger MTRC and government planning consultants report that the 'designed maximum one-hour carrying capacity' is actually 64,000, a figure described in Hansard footnotes as 'calculated in terms of the highest train frequency allowed with the existing signaling system'; in the consultants' report, 2011 average loading from Kam Sheung Road to Tsuen Wan West during the busiest morning peak hour stood at 65% (of the "one-direction passenger capacity of the trains operated along the railway line", the exact figure of which was unspecified): consultants thus referred to "under-utilisation of train capacity"^{3.11}. (The same consultant also forecast 50,000 pax/hr in 2031, given a peak service of 28 tph at 75,000 pax/hr capacity.)

=== Actual ridership ===
In present operations, parliamentary briefs state that the Kowloon Southern Link raised the one-hour carrying capacity from 39,900 to 46,900 pax/hr when headway was shortened from 3.5 minutes to 3.

2013 LegCo submissions from the MTRC confirmed that the capacity was at 46,900 pax/hr, with average train loading during morning peak hours on weekdays (from 6.30am to 9am) at around 70%. Extrapolated, 4.5 pax/square metre would translate to 'maximal overcrowding' by London Underground authorities' definitions; however, James Blake, then Senior Director/Capital Projects of KCRC, noted that 6 pax/square metre was used in demand-capacity projections at peak times, and "this figure would be quite acceptable to the ordinary travelling public even at peak times"^{p. 11}.

In December 2013, the Transport and Housing Bureau submitted detailed definitions to legislators regarding average train loading without specifying the figures: they were eventually released in February 2014 in a Legco subcommittee submission. It recognised that 6 pax/square metre design capacity standards were not achieved in actual operations, and that the service level of new MTR lines is pitched at 4 pax/square metre service benchmark. At 4 pax/square metre, the critical link on the line ran at 99% capacity (34,600 pax/hr) in 2013, partly due to lengthy turnaround times at the present Hung Hom terminus which depressed realizable carrying capacity by 20%.

Platform screen doors

All West Rail line stations have platform screen doors. The only exception was Hung Hom station, which shared its platform with the East Rail line until it was moved underground on 20 June 2021.

== Fare system ==
The fare system of the line generally followed the other lines on the former KCR network. Octopus cards and single ride tickets were available. All persons aged between 12 and 64 were charged the adult fare, whereas children aged 11 or below, full-time students, and seniors aged 65 or above were entitled to a concession fare.

As with the contemporaneous East Tsim Sha Tsui extension, the KCRC adopted a value of time methodology when fare levels were established for new services, resulting in a significant markup compared to bus and East Rail services.

Like the East Rail, Tuen Ma, and Tung Chung lines, the West Rail line also offered day passes and monthly passes.

Monthly passes
"Tuen Mun-Hung Hom Monthly Pass" and "Tuen Mun-Nam Cheong Monthly Pass" are Octopus-stored monthly unlimited passes between the said stations, Light Rail, MTR Bus, and designated minibus routes. They were priced at HK$490 and $420 respectively unless passengers hold valid discounted passes ($410/$330), in which case the discount is rolled on. Connections to the rest of the MTR network are charged to the Octopus as if the journey were made from/to the cheapest of the interchanging West Rail line station.

Day passes
"Tuen Mun-Nam Cheong Day Pass" is a $28 electronic/paper ticket combo between the said stations, MTR Bus and Light Rail; other onward connections must be made separately by exiting and re-entering the station.

A sightseeing bus service was run as a temporary feeder service of the West Rail line in the northwest New Territories. This service was launched on 26 September 2004 and ended on 28 November.

== Stations ==
The following is a list of the stations on the West Rail line, all of which have now been transferred to the Tuen Ma line.

Livery and Station Name		Connections	Opening date	District
English	Chinese	Connections	Opening date	District
Tuen Mun	屯門	Tuen Mun: 505 507 751	20 December 2003	Tuen Mun
Siu Hong	兆康	Siu Hong: 505 610 614 614P 615 615P 751	20 December 2003	Tuen Mun
Tin Shui Wai	天水圍	Tin Shui Wai: 705 706 751 751P; Tin Yiu: 705 706 761P	20 December 2003	Yuen Long
Long Ping	朗屏		20 December 2003	Yuen Long
Yuen Long	元朗	Yuen Long: 610 614 615 761P	20 December 2003	Yuen Long
Kam Sheung Road	錦上路		20 December 2003	Yuen Long
Tsuen Wan West	荃灣西		20 December 2003	Tsuen Wan
Mei Foo	美孚	Tsuen Wan line	20 December 2003	Sham Shui Po
Nam Cheong	南昌	Tung Chung line	20 December 2003	Sham Shui Po
Austin	柯士甸	Kowloon: Tung Chung line Airport Express; West Kowloon: High-speed rail services to mainland China	16 August 2009	Yau Tsim Mong
East Tsim Sha Tsui	尖東	Tsim Sha Tsui: Tsuen Wan line	24 October 2004 (Note: Originally opened as part of the East Rail line.)	Yau Tsim Mong
Hung Hom	紅磡	East Rail line; Through Train services to mainland China	30 November 1975 Platform relocated on 15 May 2022	Yau Tsim Mong

== Major incidents ==
=== Train explosion ===
At 9:15am on 14 February 2007, a passenger train broke down when one of the voltage transformers mounted on the train roof exploded. This incident occurred in the southbound direction in the tunnel between Kam Sheung Road and Tsuen Wan West, about 2 kilometres (1.2 mi) north of Tsuen Wan West. Around 650 passengers had to evacuate through the dark tunnel to the station, while around 340 people returned to the ground through a ventilation shaft at Chai Wan Kok. Eleven people were sent to hospital. Train services returned to normal after 4 hours.

It was suspected that the overheated transformer caused its insulating oil to vaporise, thus causing the explosion. The train-borne circuit breaker, which was connected in parallel to the voltage transformer to the train pantograph, was not designed to isolate this kind of fault. After the incident, all SP1900 EMUs had their voltage transformers replaced. The new voltage transformers are German-made dry type transformers, which will not catch fire, even if they fail.

As an apology, the West Rail was opened for free rides on 21 February 2007, the first working day after the Chinese New Year holiday.

=== Yuen Long attack ===
On the night of 21 July 2019, during ongoing protests in the territory, Yuen Long station was stormed by armed men, and 45 people were injured.

== Future development ==
Current proposals tabled under the Railway Development Strategy 2014 plan by the Hong Kong Government include the Northern Link, a spur line from Kam Sheung Road station to Lok Ma Chau station and a future Kwu Tung station, both on the Lok Ma Chau Spur Line of the East Rail line; and two new stations on the current West Rail line route in Hung Shui Kiu and Tuen Mun South. Hung Shui Kiu may house 160,000 in a new town, whereas Tuen Mun South is already home to 90,000 residents.

== See also ==
- Transport in Hong Kong
- Rail transport in Hong Kong
