= Tin Wing stop =

Hong Kong light rail station

Coordinates: 22°27′36″N 114°00′08″E

Tin Wing 天榮
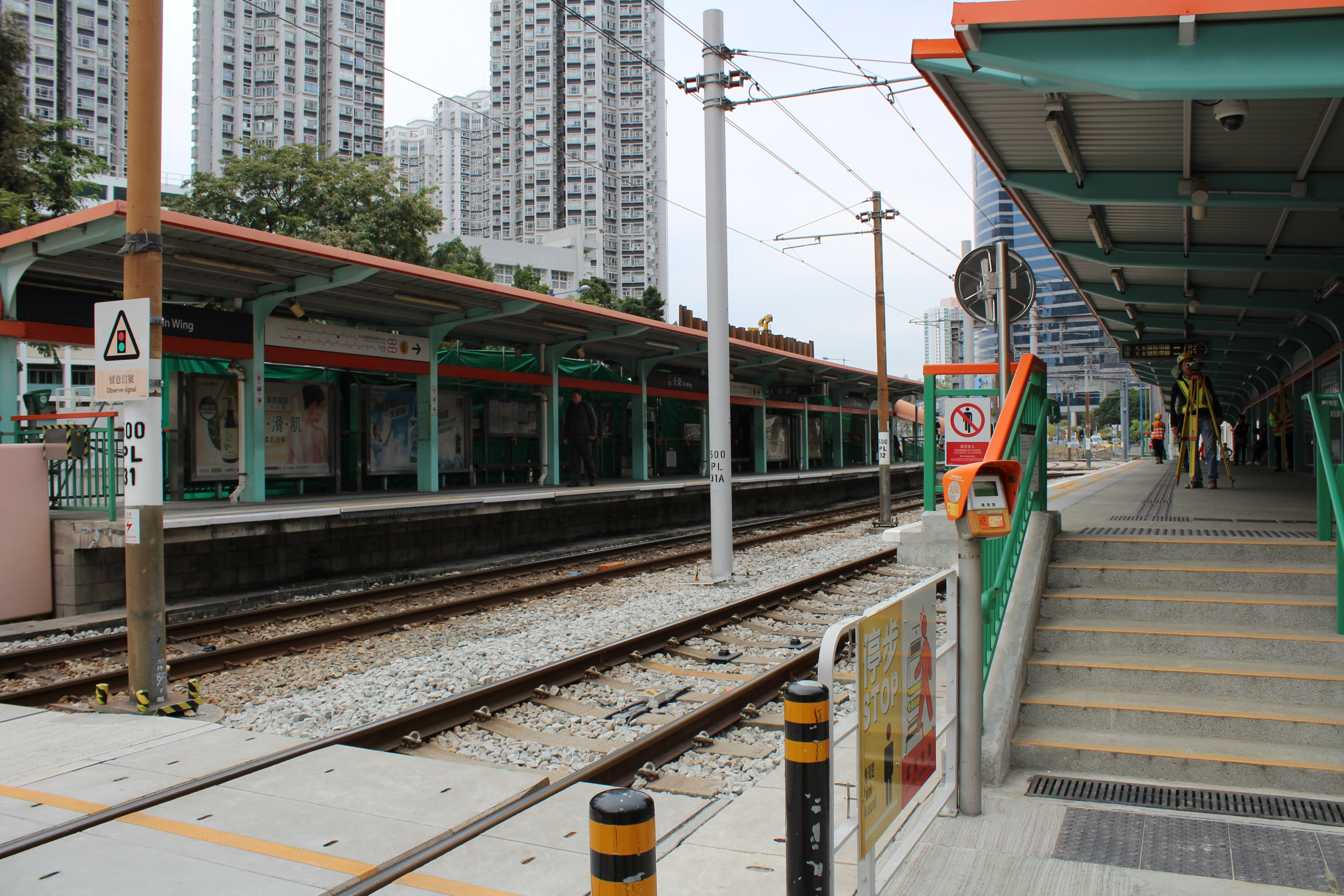
- Platforms 6 and 7

General information
- Location: Tin Shui Wai Town Centre; Yuen Long District; Hong Kong
- System: MTR Light Rail stop
- Owner: KCR Corporation
- Operator: MTR Corporation
- Line: 705 706 751 751P
- Platforms: 2 side platforms
- Tracks: 2
- Connections: Bus, minibus

Construction
- Structure type: At-grade
- Accessible: yes

Other information
- Station code: TWI (English code); 500 (Digital code)
- Fare zone: 4

History
- Opened: 26 March 1995; 31 years ago
- Former names: Tin Shui Wai

Services
Preceding stop	MTR Light Rail	Following stop
Tin Yuet Anticlockwise around Tin Shui Wai	705	Ginza One-way operation
Tin Yuet One-way operation	706	Ginza Clockwise around Tin Shui Wai
Ginza towards Yau Oi	751	Chestwood towards Tin Yat
Ginza towards Tin Shui Wai	751P Peak hours only	Chestwood towards Tin Yat
Location
- Location within MTR

Tin Wing (Chinese: 天榮) (formerly named Tin Shui Wai until 1 August 2003) is an MTR Light Rail stop. It is located at ground level beside Tin Shing Road in Tin Shui Wai Town Centre, Yuen Long District. It began service on 26 March 1995 and belongs to Zone 4.

== History ==
The stop was originally named Tin Shui Wai Terminus (Chinese: 天水圍總站). To avoid confusion with the new Tin Shui Wai station (Chinese: 天水圍站) on the KCRC West Rail (now part of the MTR Tuen Ma line), which has a light rail station of the same name, its name was changed to Tin Wing. The change came into effect on 1 August 2003.

On 7 December 2003, two extensions of the light rail network in Tin Shui Wai came into service, namely the Tin Shui Wai Phase 4 Extension and Tin Shui Wai Reserve Zone Extension, two weeks before the opening of the new West Rail commuter line. This transformed Tin Wing from the terminus of the line into an intermediate station. At the same time, the 720 (Tin Wing–Yau Oi) and 721 (Tin Wing–Yuen Long Terminus) routes were replaced with routes 751 (Tin Yat–Yau Oi) and 761 (Tin Wing–Yuen Long), respectively.

Route 761 was discontinued on 8 October 2006. As a result, there is no longer a direct service from Tin Wing stop to Yuen Long.

On 24 April 2026, the new indoor platforms - underneath YOHO West - (no.1, 3 and 4) are in operation, while the platform 7 is already shut down.

== Property development ==
The Kowloon-Canton Railway Corporation (KCR) successfully applied to the Town Planning Board to allow a property development above the then-Tin Shui Wai Terminus. When the MTR Corporation (MTRC) and Kowloon-Canton Railway Corporation merged their operations in 2007, the MTRC purchased various KCR property development rights, including the Tin Wing project. The original plans included four 43-storey blocks with 1,600 flats.

In February 2015, the MTR Corporation signed an agreement with developer Sun Hung Kai Properties to jointly develop the site as a three-tower development with 1,930 flats and a commercial element. Tin Wing stop was reconfigured as a conventional side platform station along Tin Shing Road, and the other platforms as well as the loop tracks were demolished to make way for the construction project, which is expected to be completed in 2024.

In July 2018, the MTR Corporation disclosed that subsidence had been detected at platform 7 between October 2017 and 25 June 2018, as a result of the construction of the adjacent property development; and that Sun Hung Kai Properties was asked to suspend work after a limit of 80 mm (3.1 in) was breached on 25 June. Light rail drivers were apparently told by MTRC management to slow down upon approaching the stop without being informed why. The corporation was criticised by some legislators, including Roy Kwong of the Democratic Party, for not having previously publicly disclosed that the incident had happened.

According to the Hong Kong government, the situation was examined by the Buildings Department (BD) and Electrical and Mechanical Services Department (EMSD). The Buildings Department subsequently agreed to raise the acceptable subsidence limit from 80 to 150 mm. In May 2019, the government gave the go-ahead for construction work to resume. The government stated that BD, EMSD, and MTRC would continue to monitor the situation closely to ensure the safety of railway operations.
