= Tin Shui stop =

Coordinates: 22°27′22″N 113°59′57″E

Tin Shui 天瑞
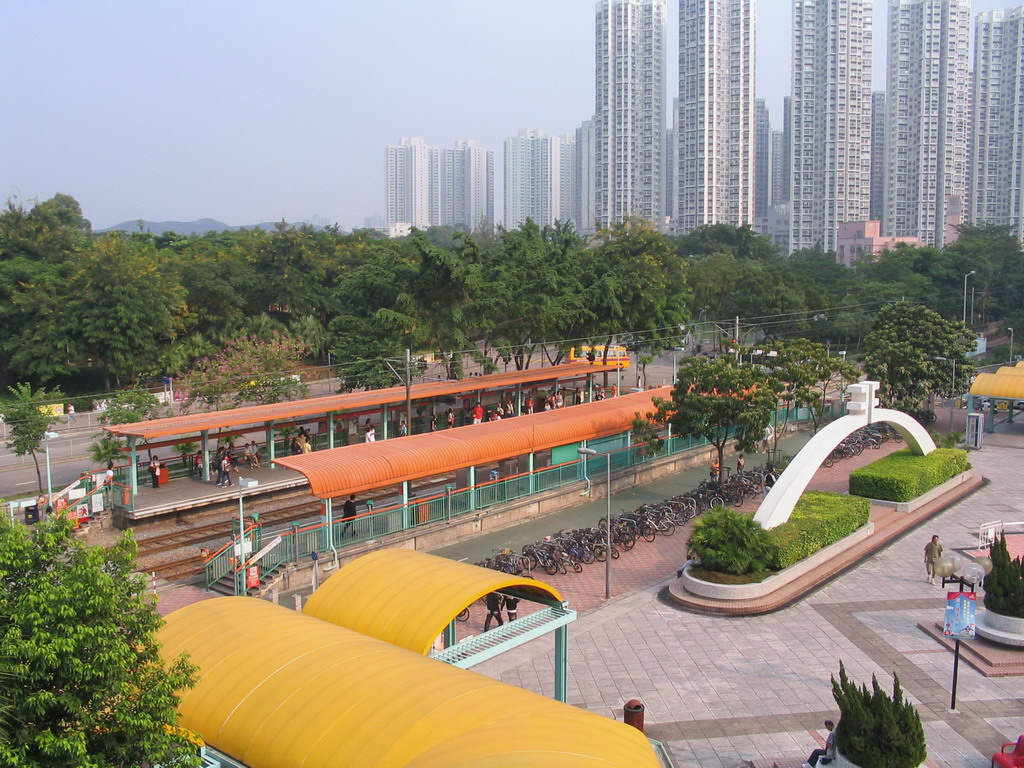
- Appearance of Tin Shui stop

General information
- Location: Tin Shui Estate; Hong Kong
- System: MTR Light Rail stop
- Owner: KCR Corporation
- Operator: MTR Corporation
- Line: 705 706 761P
- Platforms: 2 side platforms
- Tracks: 2
- Connections: Bus, minibus

Construction
- Structure type: At-grade
- Accessible: yes

Other information
- Station code: TSU (English code); 460 (Digital code)
- Fare zone: 4

History
- Opened: 10 January 1993; 33 years ago

Services
Preceding stop	MTR Light Rail	Following stop
Locwood Anticlockwise around Tin Shui Wai	705	Chung Fu One-way operation
Locwood One-way operation	706	Chung Fu Clockwise around Tin Shui Wai
Chung Fu towards Tin Yat	761P	Locwood towards Yuen Long
Location
- Location within MTR

Tin Shui (Chinese: 天瑞) is an MTR Light Rail stop. It is located at ground level on Tin Shui Road, near Tin Shui Estate, in Tin Shui Wai, Yuen Long District. It began service on 10 January 1993 and belongs to Zone 4.

== History ==
The stop was the terminus of the Light Rail Tin Shui Wai branch (first phase) from 1993 to 1995. However, it became an intermediate station after the line was extended to Tin Shui Wai terminus (Chinese: 天水圍總站; now Tin Wing) in 1995.
