= Tin Shui Wai station =

MTR station in the New Territories, Hong Kong

Tin Shui Wai 天水圍
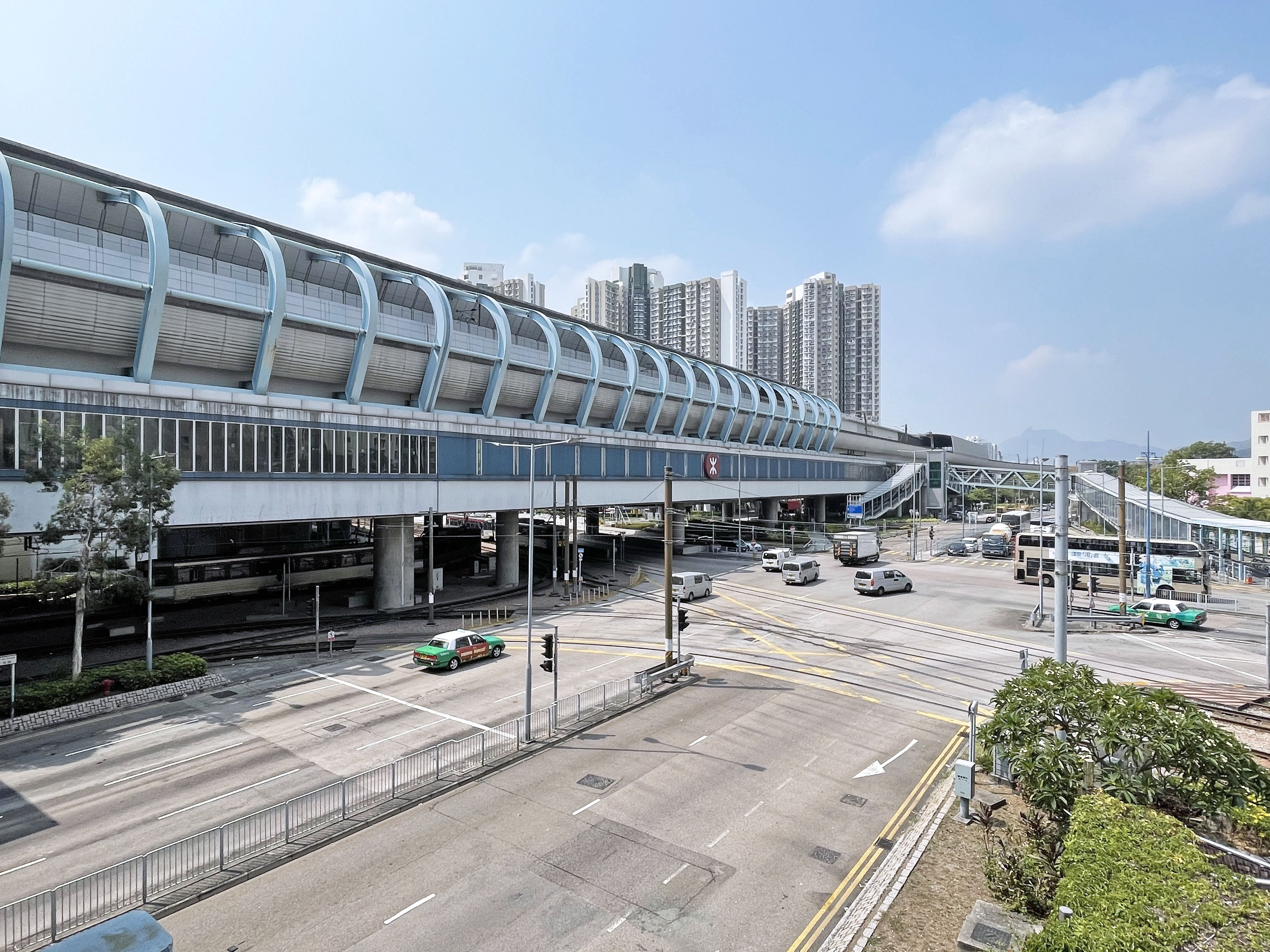
- Exterior of Tin Shui Wai station

Chinese name
- Traditional Chinese: 天水圍
- Simplified Chinese: 天水围
- Cantonese Yale: Tīnséuiwài
- Literal meaning: Sky Water Surrounded
Transcriptions
Standard Mandarin
- Hanyu Pinyin: Tiānshǔiwéi
Yue: Cantonese
- Yale Romanization: Tīnséuiwài
- Jyutping: Tin1seoi2wai4

General information
- Location: Ping Ha Road × Kiu Cheong Road, Ping Shan; Yuen Long District, Hong Kong
- Coordinates: 22°26′53″N 114°00′17″E
- System: MTR rapid transit station
- Owner: KCR Corporation
- Operator: MTR Corporation
- Line: Tuen Ma line
- Platforms: 2 (1 island platform)
- Tracks: 2
- Connections: Tin Shui Wai stop: Routes: 705, 706, 751, 751P; Bus, minibus

Construction
- Structure type: Elevated
- Platform levels: 1
- Accessible: Yes
- Architect: Rocco Design Architects

Other information
- Station code: TIS

History
- Opened: 20 December 2003; 22 years ago

Services
Preceding station	MTR	Following station
Siu Hong towards Tuen Mun	Tuen Ma line	Long Ping towards Wu Kai Sha
Proposed
Hung Shui Kiu towards Tuen Mun South	Tuen Ma line	Long Ping towards Wu Kai Sha
Preceding stop	MTR Light Rail	Following stop
Tin Tsz Anticlockwise around Tin Shui Wai	705 transfer at Tin Shui Wai	Tin Yiu One-way operation
Tin Tsz One-way operation	706 transfer at Tin Shui Wai	Tin Yiu Clockwise around Tin Shui Wai
Hang Mei Tsuen towards Yau Oi	751 transfer at Tin Shui Wai	Tin Tsz towards Tin Yat
Terminus	751P Peak hours only transfer at Tin Shui Wai	Tin Tsz towards Tin Yat
Track layout
Location
- Location within MTR

Tin Shui Wai (Chinese: 天水圍; Cantonese Yale: Tīnséuiwài) is an MTR station on the Tuen Ma line, located in Ping Shan near Tin Shui Wai New Town, Yuen Long District. It is the only heavy rail station serving Tin Shui Wai, which has a population of around 300,000.

== History ==
On 20 December 2003, Tin Shui Wai station opened to the public along with the other KCR West Rail stations.

On 27 June 2021, the West Rail line officially merged with the Ma On Shan line (which was already extended into the Tuen Ma line Phase 1 at the time) in East Kowloon to form the new Tuen Ma line, as part of the Shatin to Central link project. Tin Shui Wai was included in the project and is now an intermediate station on the Tuen Ma line.

== Location ==
The station is located in northern of Ping Shan and adjacent to Tin Yiu Estate, Tin Shing Court and Tin Yau Court.

The station is elevated over the junction of Ping Ha Road and Tin Fuk Road. Three footbridges are constructed along Tin Fuk Road and Ping Ha Road to connect the station to the highly populated urban area that the station is built in.

A public transport interchange is located to the southwest of the station.

== Station layout ==
U2; Platforms	Platform 2	Tuen Ma line towards Wu Kai Sha (Long Ping) →
U2; Platforms	Island platform, doors will open on the right
U2; Platforms	Platform 1	← Tuen Ma line towards Tuen Mun (Siu Hong)
C/U1	Concourse	Exits, footbridge
C/U1	Concourse	Customer services, toilets
C/U1	Concourse	MTRShops, ATMs, Octopus promotion machine
G	Light Rail stop	Light Rail Tin Shui Wai stop, Tsui Sing Lau Pagoda
G	Light Rail stop	Ping Shan Heritage Trail, Cycle park, footbridge
G	Public transport interchange	Public transport interchange
G	Public transport interchange	Cycle park, footbridge

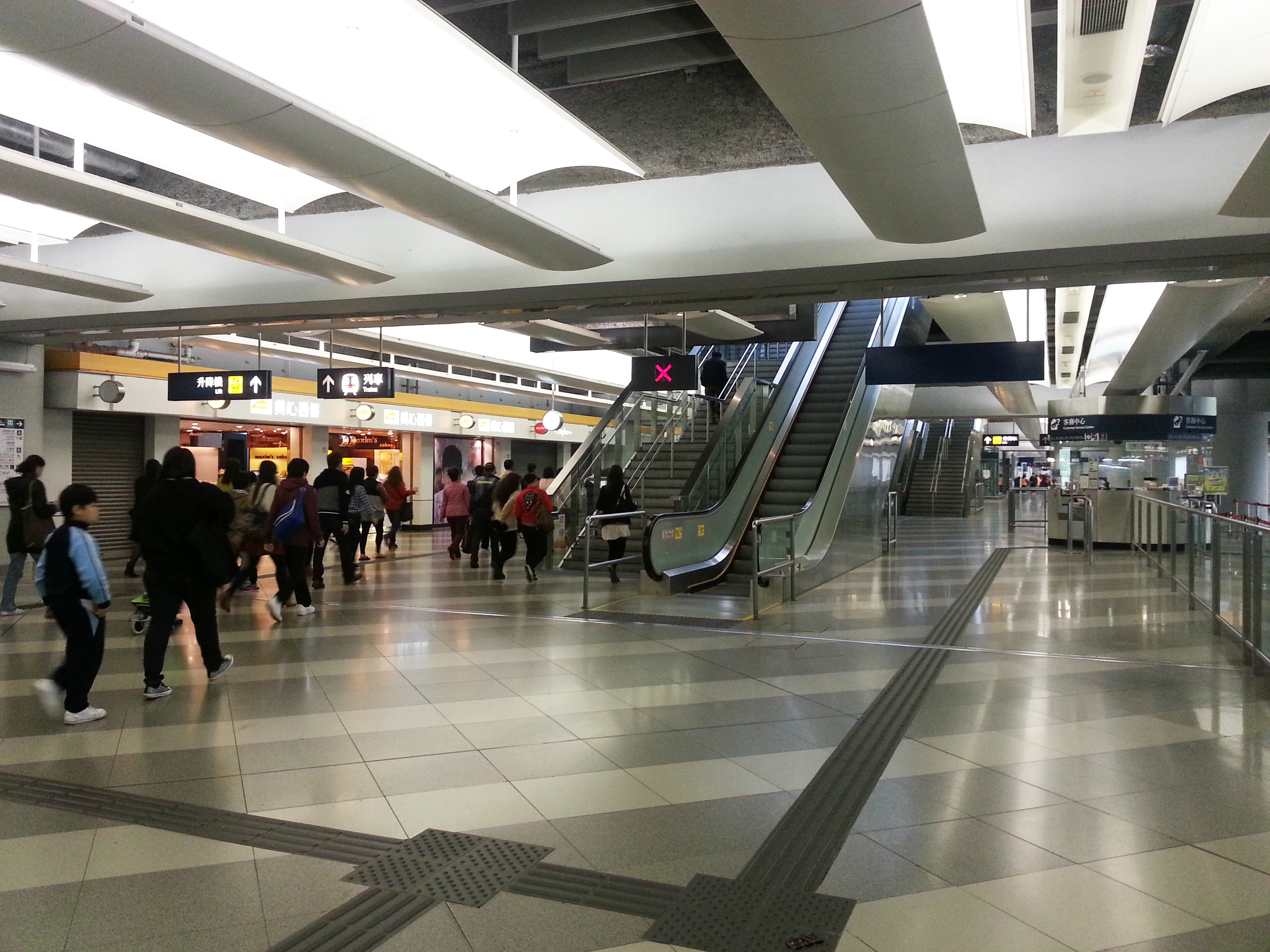
Tin Shui Wai station concourse

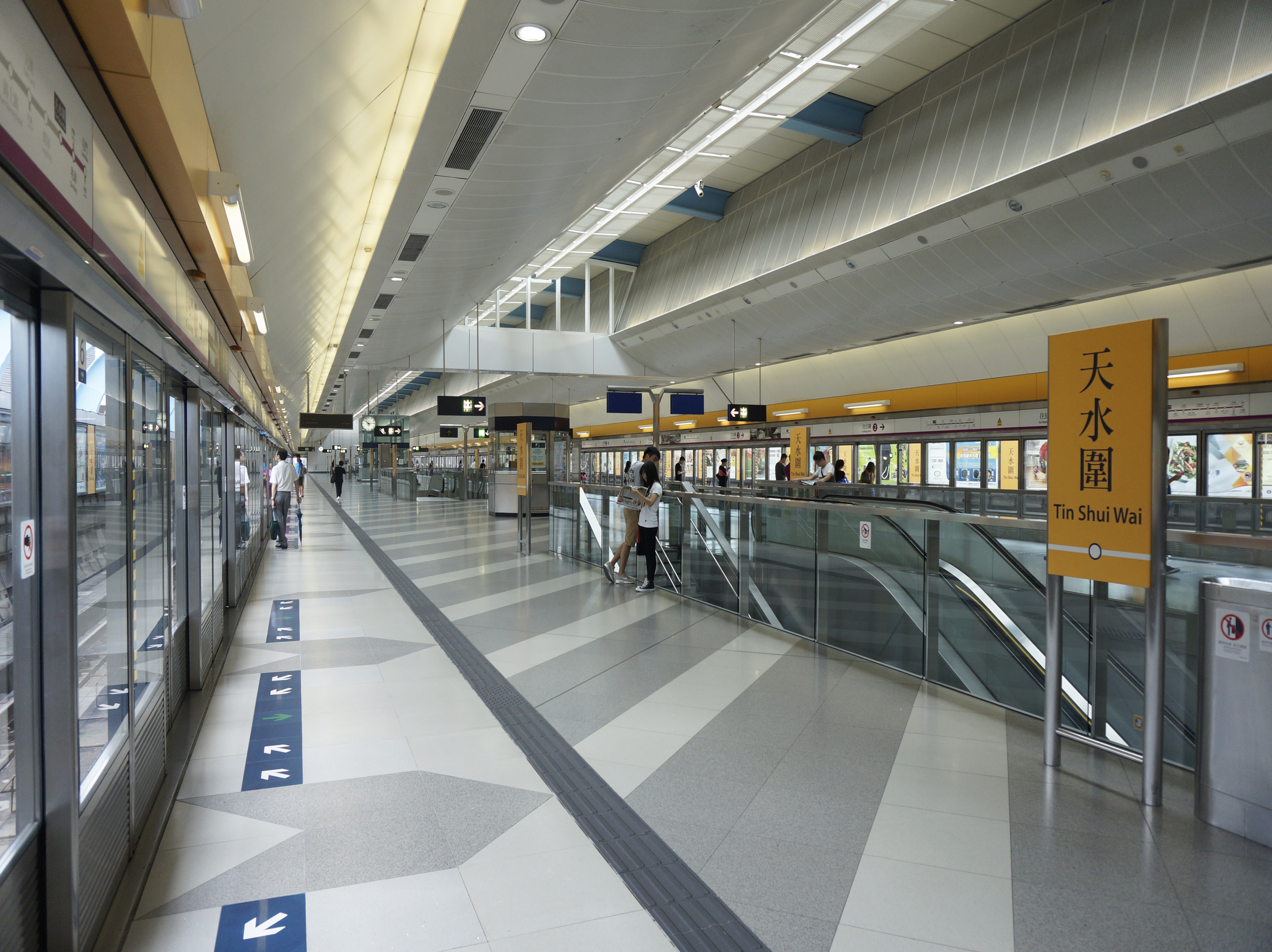
Tin Shui Wai station platform

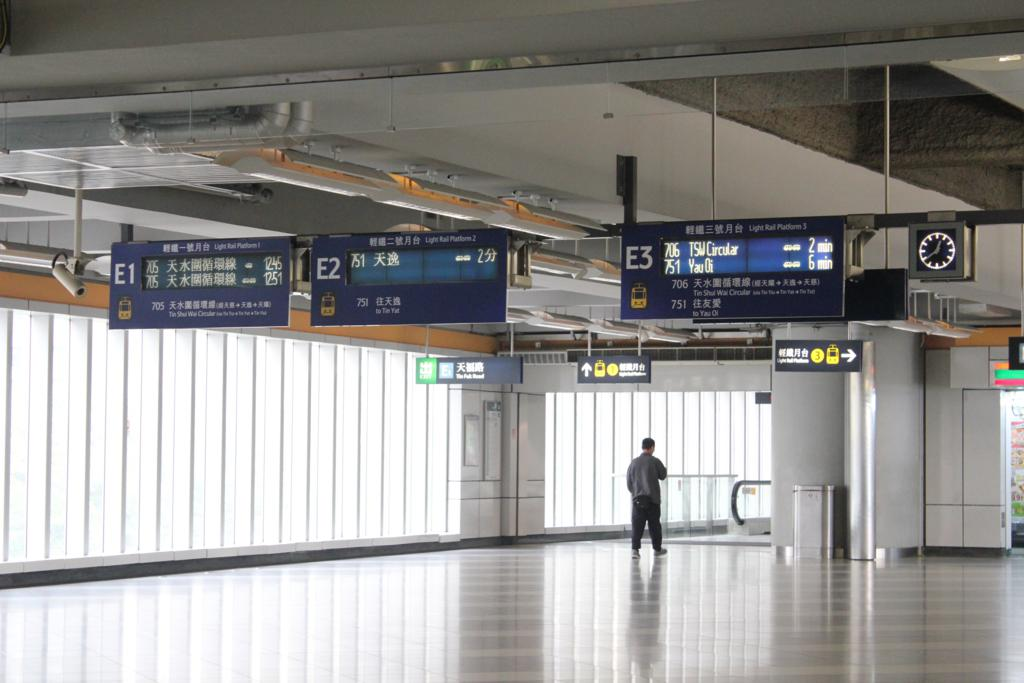
Concourse end leading down to Tin Shui Wai stop

Platforms 1 and 2 share the same island platform.

The first train to Tuen Mun departs at 6:21 a.m., while the last train departs at 12:36 a.m. the day after. The first train to Wu Kai Sha departs at 5:51 a.m., and the last train departs at 12:21 a.m. the day after.

== Entrances/exits ==
- A: Ping Yan Court
- B: Tin Shing Court
- C: Tin Yiu Estate
- D: Tin Yau Court
- E1: Light Rail Platform 1
- E2: Light Rail Platform 2
- E3: Light Rail Platform 3
