= Ginza stop =

Light rail station in Hong Kong

Coordinates: 22°27′27″N 114°00′18″E

Ginza 銀座
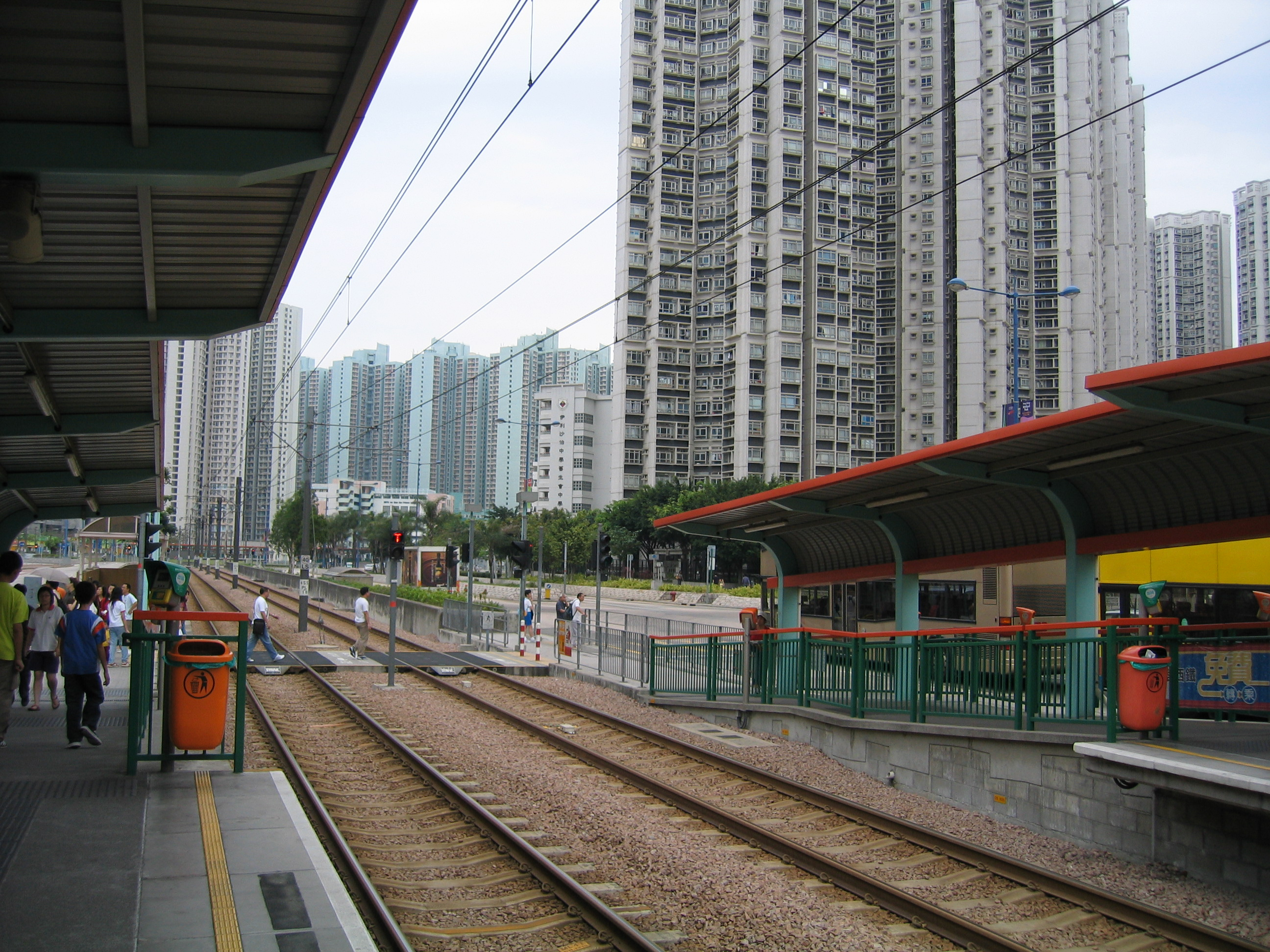
- Ginza stop's Platform

Chinese name
- Chinese: 銀座
- Cantonese Yale: ngan4 jo6
Transcriptions
Standard Mandarin
- Hanyu Pinyin: Yínzuò
Yue: Cantonese
- Yale Romanization: ngan4 jo6
- Jyutping: ngan4 zo6

General information
- Location: Fortune Kingswood; Hong Kong
- System: MTR Light Rail stop
- Owner: KCR Corporation
- Operator: MTR Corporation
- Line: 705 706 751 751P
- Platforms: 2 side platforms
- Tracks: 2
- Connections: Bus, minibus

Construction
- Structure type: At-grade
- Accessible: yes

Other information
- Station code: GIN (English code); 455 (Digital code)
- Fare zone: 4

History
- Opened: 7 December 2003; 22 years ago

Services
Preceding stop	MTR Light Rail	Following stop
Tin Wing Anticlockwise around Tin Shui Wai	705	Tin Wu One-way operation
Tin Wing One-way operation	706	Tin Wu Clockwise around Tin Shui Wai
Tin Wu towards Yau Oi	751	Tin Wing towards Tin Yat
Tin Wu towards Tin Shui Wai	751P Peak hours only	Tin Wing towards Tin Yat
Location
- Location within MTR

Ginza (Chinese: 銀座) is an MTR Light Rail stop. It is located at ground level in the centre of Tin Shing Road in Tin Shui Wai, Yuen Long District. It began service on 7 December 2003 and belongs to Zone 4. It is the only station on the MTR network with a Japanese name, and it is one of the two Light Rail stops with announcements in Mandarin Chinese.

The stop is near +WOO (Formerly Kingswood Ginza, which gave the name of this stop) and Kingswood Villas Phase 4.
