= Chestwood stop =

Hong Kong light rail station

Coordinates: 22°27′35″N 113°59′58″E

Chestwood 翠湖
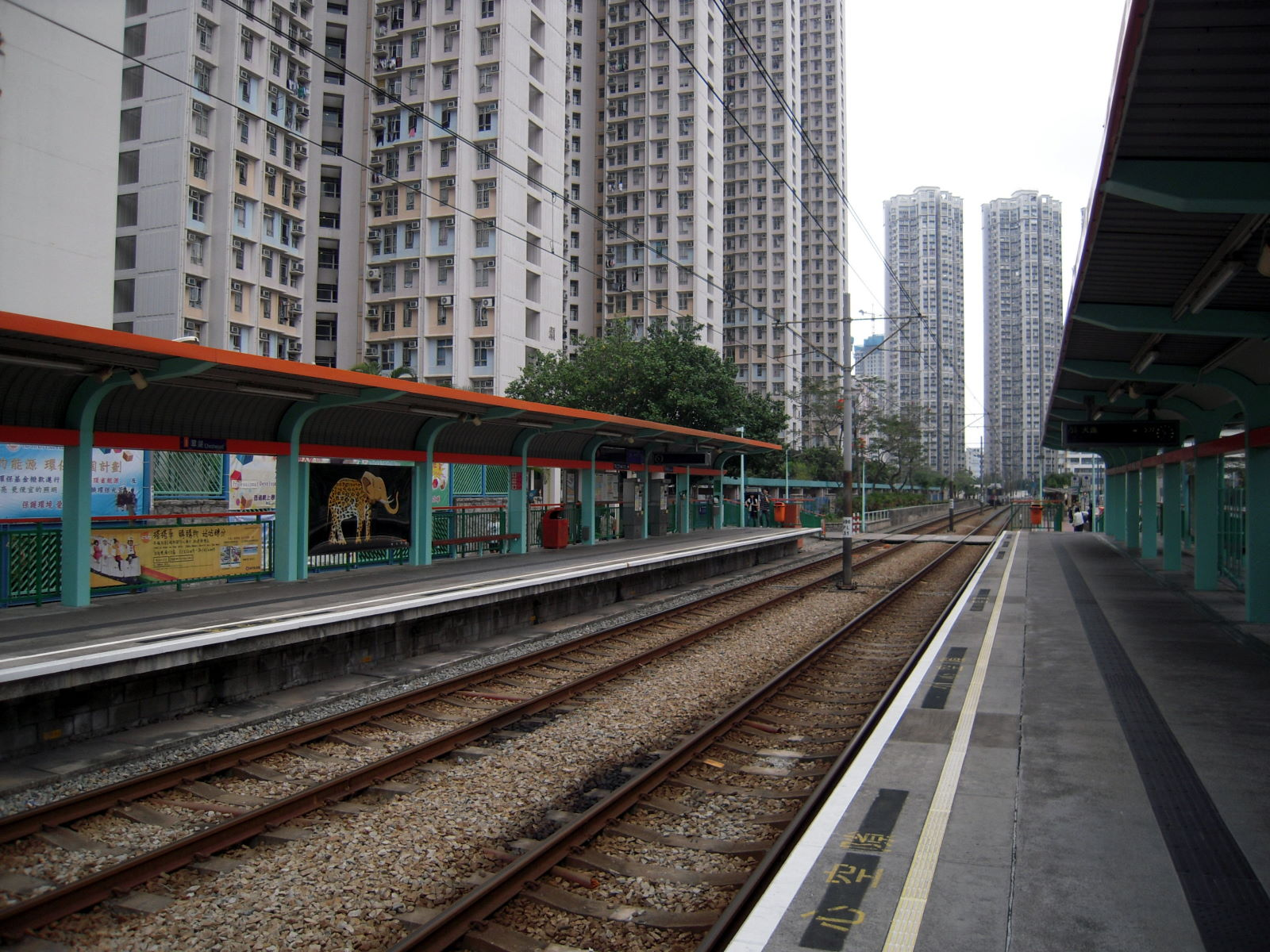
- Chestwood stop platform

General information
- Location: Chestwood Court; Hong Kong
- System: MTR Light Rail stop
- Owner: KCR Corporation
- Operator: MTR Corporation
- Line: 751 751P
- Platforms: 2 side platforms
- Tracks: 2
- Connections: Bus, minibus

Construction
- Structure type: At-grade
- Accessible: yes

Other information
- Station code: CHE (English code); 490 (Digital code)
- Fare zone: 4

History
- Opened: 26 March 1995; 31 years ago

Services
Preceding stop	MTR Light Rail	Following stop
Tin Wing towards Yau Oi	751	Chung Fu towards Tin Yat
Tin Wing towards Tin Shui Wai	751P Peak hours only	Chung Fu towards Tin Yat
Location
- Location within MTR

Chestwood (Chinese: 翠湖) is an MTR Light Rail stop. It is located at ground level at the centre of Tin Wing Road, between Chestwood Court, Kingswood Villas Phase III, and Tin Chung Court, in Tin Shui Wai, Yuen Long District. It began service on 26 March 1995 and belongs to Zone 4.
