= Grandeur Terrace =

Public housing estate in Tin Shui Wai, Hong Kong

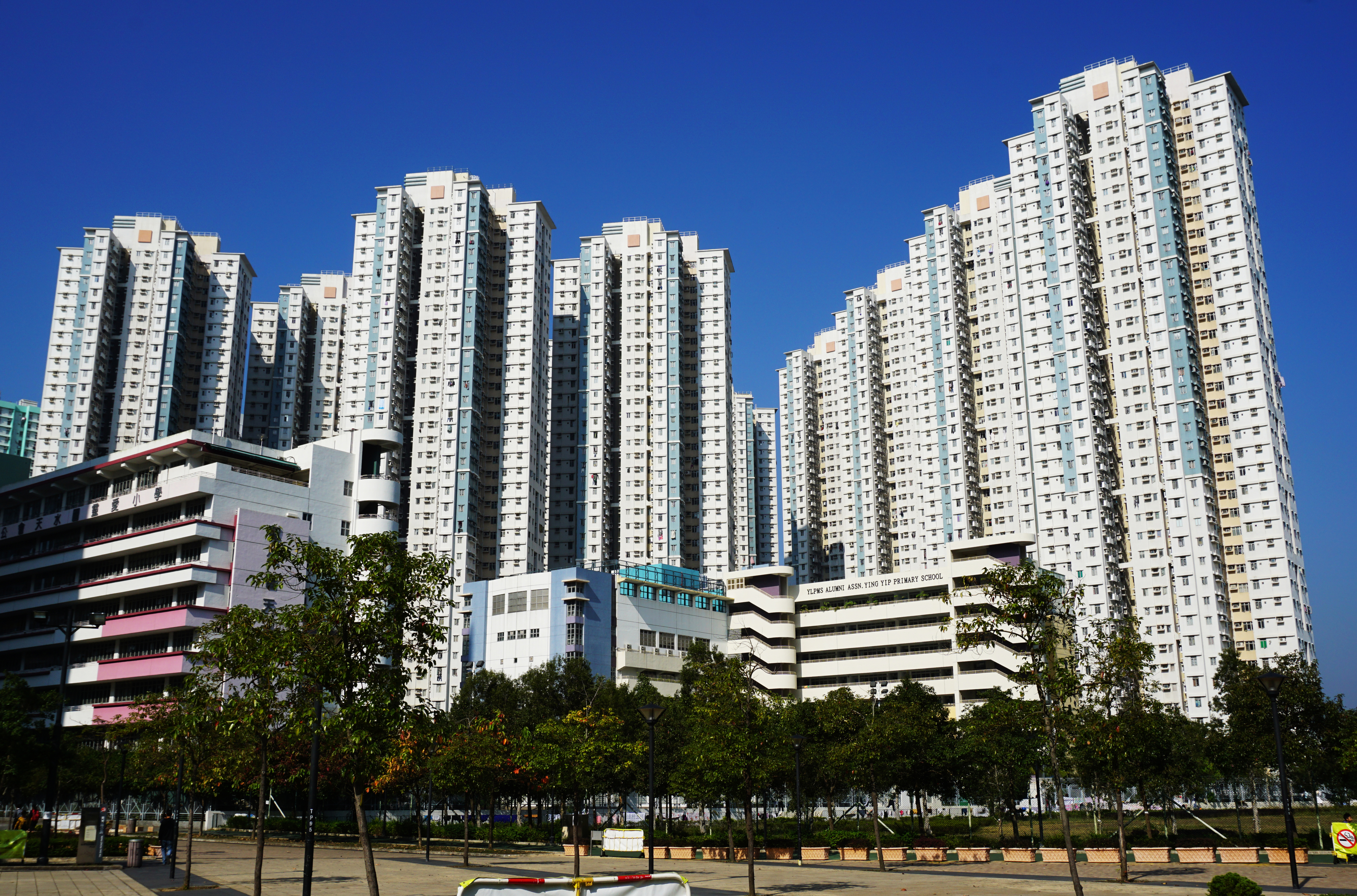
- Grandeur Terrace
- Interactive map of Grandeur Terrace

General information
- Location: 88 Tin Shui Road, Tin Shui Wai; New Territories, Hong Kong
- Coordinates: 22.46924°N 114.00147°E
- Status: Completed
- Category: Public rental housing
- Population: 12,518 (2016)
- No. of blocks: 11
- No. of units: 4,100

Construction
- Constructed: 2003; 23 years ago
- Contractors: Rich Score Development Ltd
- Authority: Hong Kong Housing Authority

Grandeur Terrace (Chinese: 俊宏軒) is a public housing estate in Tin Shui Wai, New Territories, Hong Kong, near Hong Kong Wetland Park as well as Light Rail Tin Heng and Wetland Park stop. It is the only estate in Tin Shui Wai which its name does not have the prefix "Tin" (Chinese: 天) and was a HOS and PSPS court, and it is the largest PSPS in Hong Kong with 4,100 residential units. It was jointly developed by Hong Kong Housing Authority and Rich Score Development Ltd, a wholly owned subsidiary of Chun Wo Holdings Limited and it consists of eleven residential buildings completed in 2003. When it was completed, the estate was transferred to public rental housing.

== Houses ==
Name	Chinese name	Building type	Completed
Tower 1	第1座	Private Sector Participation Scheme	2003
Tower 2	第2座	Private Sector Participation Scheme	2003
Tower 3	第3座	Private Sector Participation Scheme	2003
Tower 4	第4座	Private Sector Participation Scheme	2003
Tower 5	第5座	Private Sector Participation Scheme	2003
Tower 6	第6座	Private Sector Participation Scheme	2003
Tower 7	第7座	Private Sector Participation Scheme	2003
Tower 8	第8座	Private Sector Participation Scheme	2003
Tower 9	第9座	Private Sector Participation Scheme	2003
Tower 10	第10座	Private Sector Participation Scheme	2003
Tower 11	第11座	Private Sector Participation Scheme	2003

== Demographics ==
According to the 2016 by-census, Grandeur Terrace had a population of 12,518. The median age was 39.5 and the majority of residents (98.4 per cent) were of Chinese ethnicity. The average household size was 3.1 people. The median monthly household income of all households (i.e. including both economically active and inactive households) was HK$20,500.

== Politics ==
Grandeur Terrace is located in Wang Yat constituency of the Yuen Long District Council. It was formerly represented by Mo Kai-hong, who was elected in the 2019 elections until July 2021.

== See also ==
- Public housing estates in Tin Shui Wai
