= Locwood stop =

Light rail stop in Hong Kong

Coordinates: 22°27′11″N 114°00′36″E

Locwood 樂湖
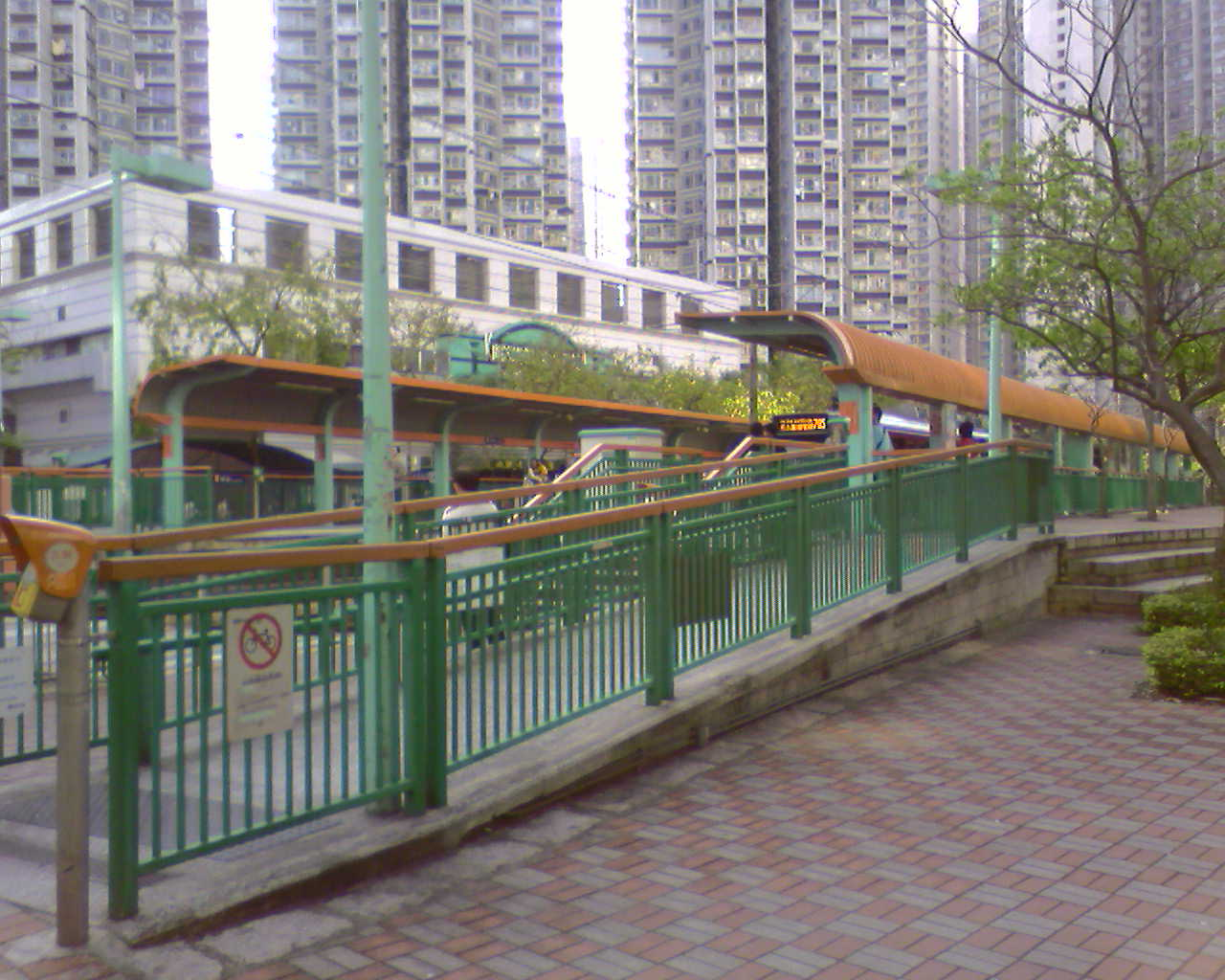
- Locwood stop's Platform

General information
- Location: Locwood Court and Sherwood Court, Kingswood Villas; Hong Kong
- System: MTR Light Rail stop
- Owner: KCR Corporation
- Operator: MTR Corporation
- Line: 705 706 761P
- Platforms: 2 side platforms
- Tracks: 2
- Connections: Bus, minibus

Construction
- Structure type: At-grade
- Accessible: yes

Other information
- Station code: LOC (English code); 448 (Digital code)
- Fare zone: 4

History
- Opened: 10 January 1993; 33 years ago

Services
Preceding stop	MTR Light Rail	Following stop
Tin Yiu Anticlockwise around Tin Shui Wai	705	Tin Shui One-way operation
Tin Yiu One-way operation	706	Tin Shui Clockwise around Tin Shui Wai
Tin Shui towards Tin Yat	761P	Tin Yiu towards Yuen Long
Location
- Location within MTR

Locwood (Chinese: 樂湖) is an MTR Light Rail stop. It is located at ground level at Tin Shui Road, between Locwood Court and Sherwood Court of Kingswood Villas, in Tin Shui Wai, Yuen Long District. It began service on 10 January 1993 and belongs to Zone 4.

== History ==
The stop was planned to be named "Kingswood" (Chinese: 嘉湖) before Light Rail Tin Shui Wai Branch started operations in 1993. However, to consider other stops in individual areas of Kingswood Villas afterwards, its name was finalized to "Locwood" when Tin Shui Wai Branch operated.
