= Tin Wu stop =

Tin Wu 天湖
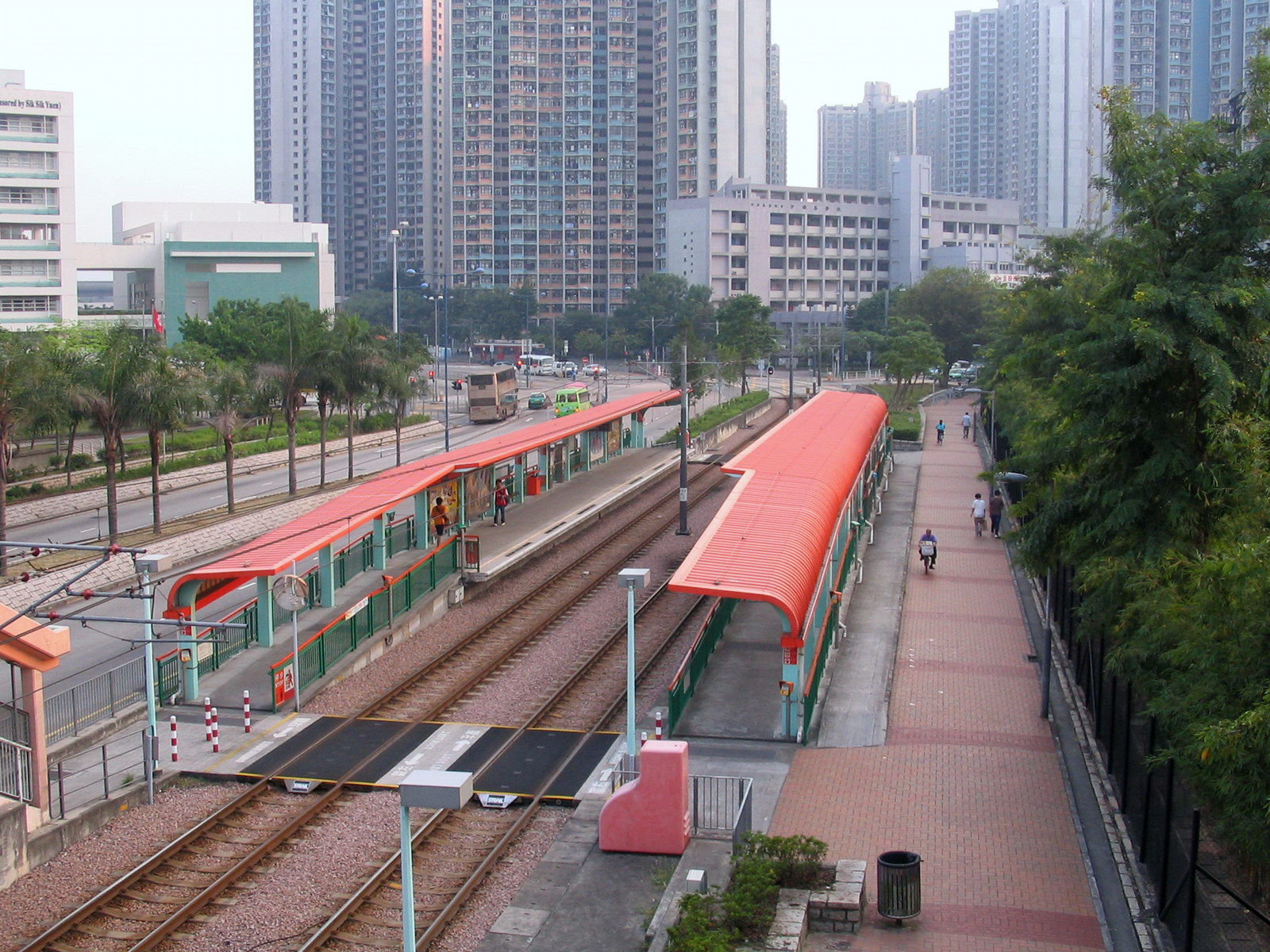
- Tin Wu stop's Platform

General information
- Location: Tin Wu Road, Tin Shui Wai; Yuen Long District; Hong Kong
- Coordinates: 22°27′18″N 114°00′21″E
- System: MTR Light Rail stop
- Owner: KCR Corporation
- Operator: MTR Corporation
- Line: 705 706 751 751P
- Platforms: 2 side platforms
- Tracks: 2
- Connections: Bus, minibus

Construction
- Structure type: At-grade
- Accessible: yes

Other information
- Station code: TWU (English code); 450 (Digital code)
- Fare zone: 4

History
- Opened: July 12; 2014 years ago

Services
Preceding stop	MTR Light Rail	Following stop
Ginza Anticlockwise around Tin Shui Wai	705	Tin Tsz One-way operation
Ginza One-way operation	706	Tin Tsz Clockwise around Tin Shui Wai
Tin Tsz towards Yau Oi	751	Ginza towards Tin Yat
Tin Tsz towards Tin Shui Wai	751P Peak hours only	Ginza towards Tin Yat
Location
- Location within MTR

Tin Wu (Chinese: 天湖) is an MTR Light Rail stop. It is located at ground level at the junction of Tin Wu Road and Tin Shing Road in Tin Shui Wai, Yuen Long District. It began service on 7 December 2003 and belongs to Zone 4. It serves Tin Shui Wai Sports Ground and Tin Shui Wai Sports Centre.
