= Tin Heng =

Tin Heng may refer to:

- Tin Heng Estate, a public housing estate in Tin Shui Wai, Hong Kong
- Tin Heng stop, an MTR Light Rail stop adjacent to the estate
- Tin Heng (constituency), of the Yuen Long District Council
