= TWU =

TWU may refer to:

- Telecommunications Workers Union, Canada
- Tennessee Wesleyan University, Athens, TN
- Texas Wesleyan University, Fort Worth, US
- Texas Woman's University, Denton, US
- Tin Wu stop, Hong Kong - MTR station code TWU
- Transport Workers Union of America
- Transport Workers' Union of Australia
- TransWorld University, Yunlin, Taiwan
- Trinity Western University, Langley, British Columbia, Canada
- Tawau Airport, Sabah, Malaysia – IATA code TWU
