= Tin Tsz stop =

Coordinates: 22°27′10″N 114°00′22″E

Tin Tsz 天慈
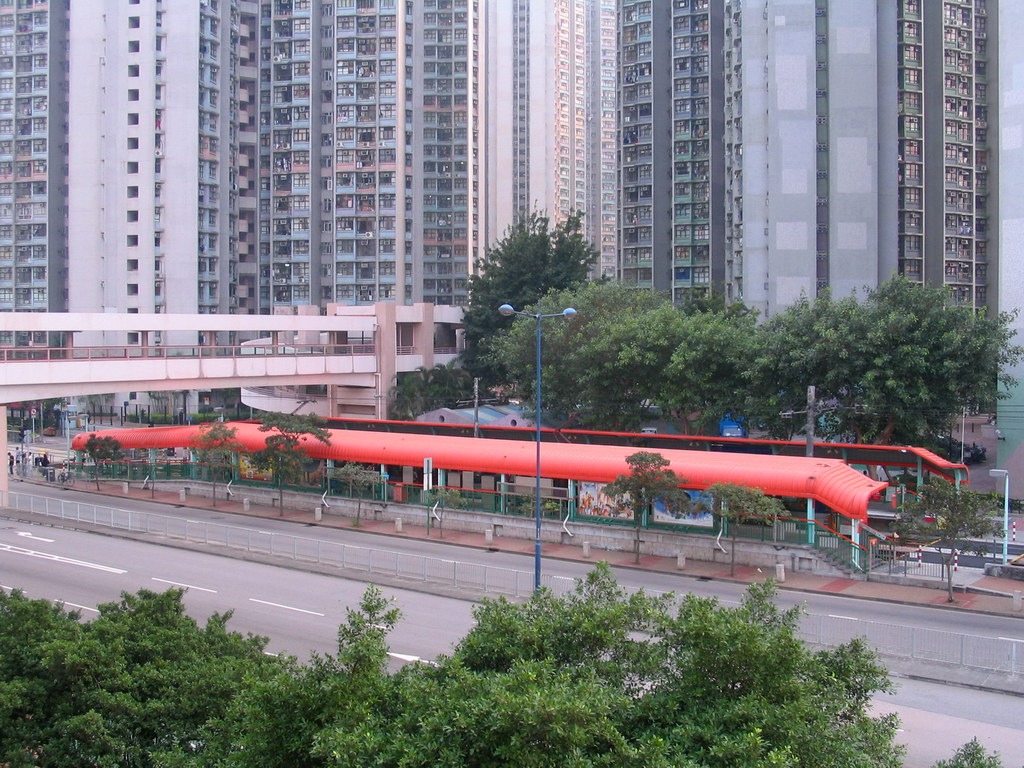
- Tin Tsz stop's Platform

General information
- Location: Tin Tsz Estate; Hong Kong
- System: MTR Light Rail stop
- Owner: KCR Corporation
- Operator: MTR Corporation
- Line: 705 706 751 751P
- Platforms: 2 side platforms
- Tracks: 2
- Connections: Bus minibus

Construction
- Structure type: At-grade
- Accessible: yes

Other information
- Station code: TIT (English code); 435 (Digital code)
- Fare zone: Zone 4

History
- Opened: 7 December 2003; 22 years ago

Services
Preceding stop	MTR Light Rail	Following stop
Tin Wu Anticlockwise around Tin Shui Wai	705	Tin Shui Wai One-way operation
Tin Wu One-way operation	706	Tin Shui Wai Clockwise around Tin Shui Wai
Tin Shui Wai towards Yau Oi	751	Tin Wu towards Tin Yat
Tin Shui Wai Terminus	751P Peak hours only	Tin Wu towards Tin Yat
Location
- Location within MTR

Tin Tsz (Chinese: 天慈) is an MTR Light Rail stop. It is located at ground level near the Tin Shing Road, near Tin Tsz Estate, in Tin Shui Wai, Yuen Long District, Hong Kong. It began service on 7 December 2003 and belongs to Zone 4 of single-ride tickets. It serves Tin Tsz Estate, Tin Lai Court, and Tin Yau Court.
