= Tin Sau stop =

Light rail stop in Hong Kong

Coordinates: 22°27′56″N 114°00′10″E

Tin Sau 天秀
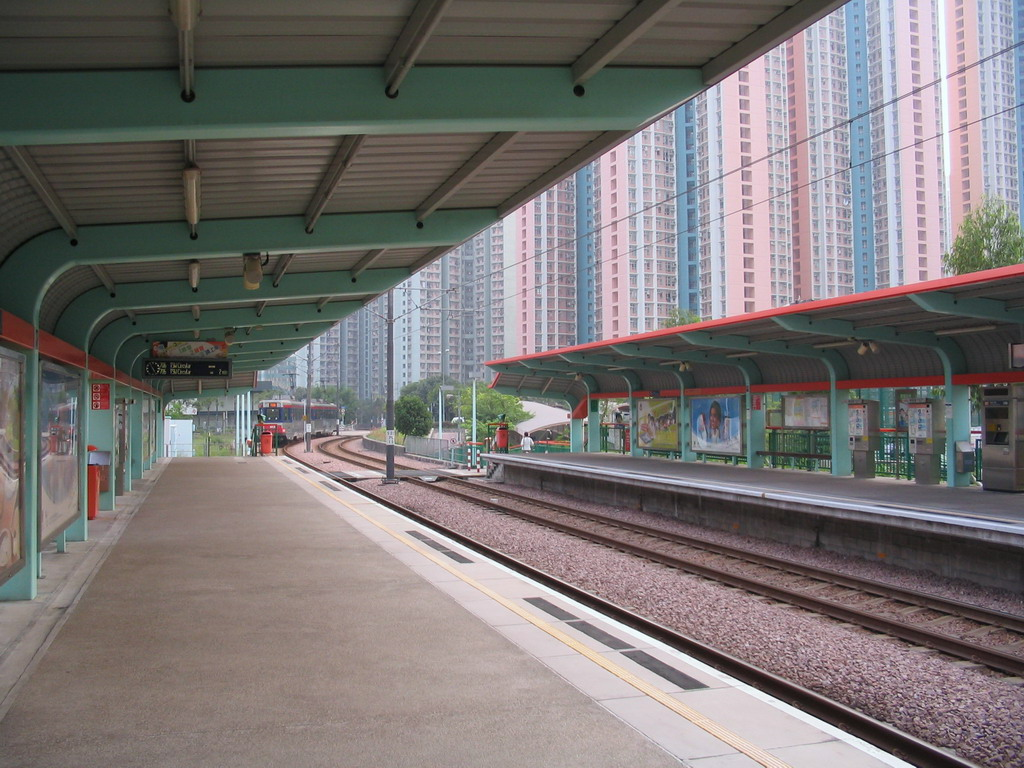
- Tin Sau stop's platform

General information
- Location: Tin Sau Road; Hong Kong
- System: MTR Light Rail stop
- Owner: KCR Corporation
- Operator: MTR Corporation
- Line: 705 706
- Platforms: 2 side platforms
- Tracks: 2
- Connections: Bus, minibus

Construction
- Structure type: At-grade
- Accessible: yes

Other information
- Station code: TSA (English code); 520 (Digital code)
- Fare zone: 5A

History
- Opened: 7 December 2003; 22 years ago

Services
Preceding stop	MTR Light Rail	Following stop
Wetland Park Anticlockwise around Tin Shui Wai	705	Tin Yuet One-way operation
Wetland Park One-way operation	706	Tin Yuet Clockwise around Tin Shui Wai
Location
- Location within MTR

Tin Sau (Chinese: 天秀) is an MTR Light Rail stop. It is located at ground level at the junction of Tin Sau Road and Tin Kwai Road, near Vianni Cove, in Tin Shui Wai, Yuen Long District. It began service on 7 December 2003 and belongs to Zone 5A.
