= Tin Shui Wai Sports Ground =

Sports venue in Tin Shui Wai, Hong Kong

Coordinates: 22°27′17″N 114°00′17″E

- 天水圍運動場
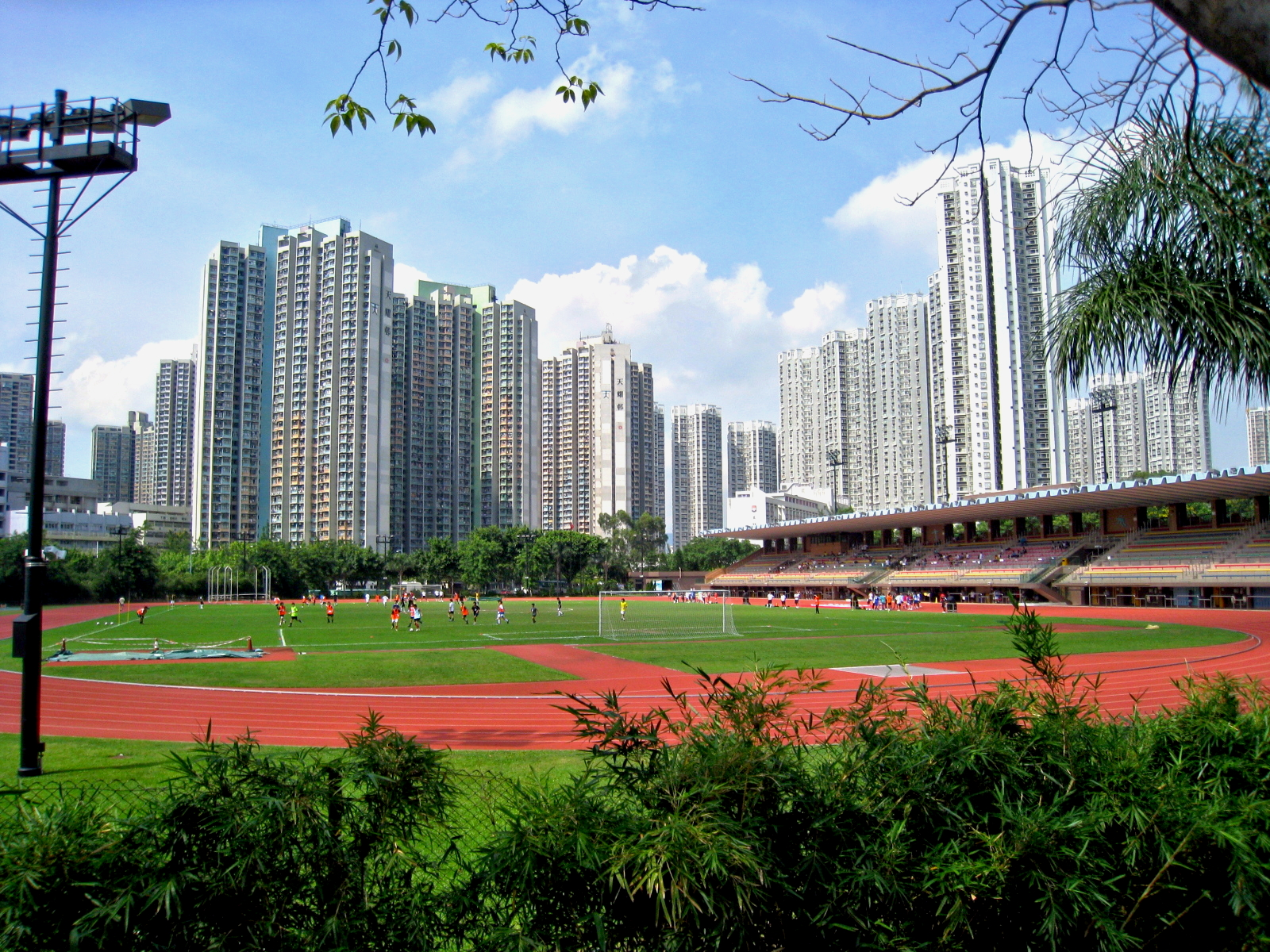
- Interactive map of Tin Shui Wai Sports Ground
- Location: 2 Tin Shui Road, Tin Shui Wai, New Territories, Hong Kong
- Owner: Leisure and Cultural Services Department
- Capacity: 2,500
- Surface: Grass
- Public transit: Tin Wu stop

Construction
- Opened: 1 April 1994; 32 years ago

Tenants
- Yuen Long; TSW Pegasus (Training)

Tin Shui Wai Sports Ground is a multi-use sports ground at 2 Tin Shui Road, Tin Shui Wai, Yuen Long, Hong Kong. It has a grass football field and a 400m running track.

It will be used by TSW Pegasus as its main training ground during the 2008-09 Hong Kong First Division League season.

== History ==
Tin Shui Wai Sports Ground was commissioned on 1 April 1994. An opening ceremony was held by Cheung Yan-lung, chairman of the Regional Council, on 24 September 1994. It has been under the management of the Leisure and Cultural Services Department since the Provisional Regional Council was disbanded at the end of the millennium.
