= Wetland Park stop =

Light rail stop in Hong Kong

Coordinates: 22°28′11″N 114°00′09″E

Wetland Park 濕地公園
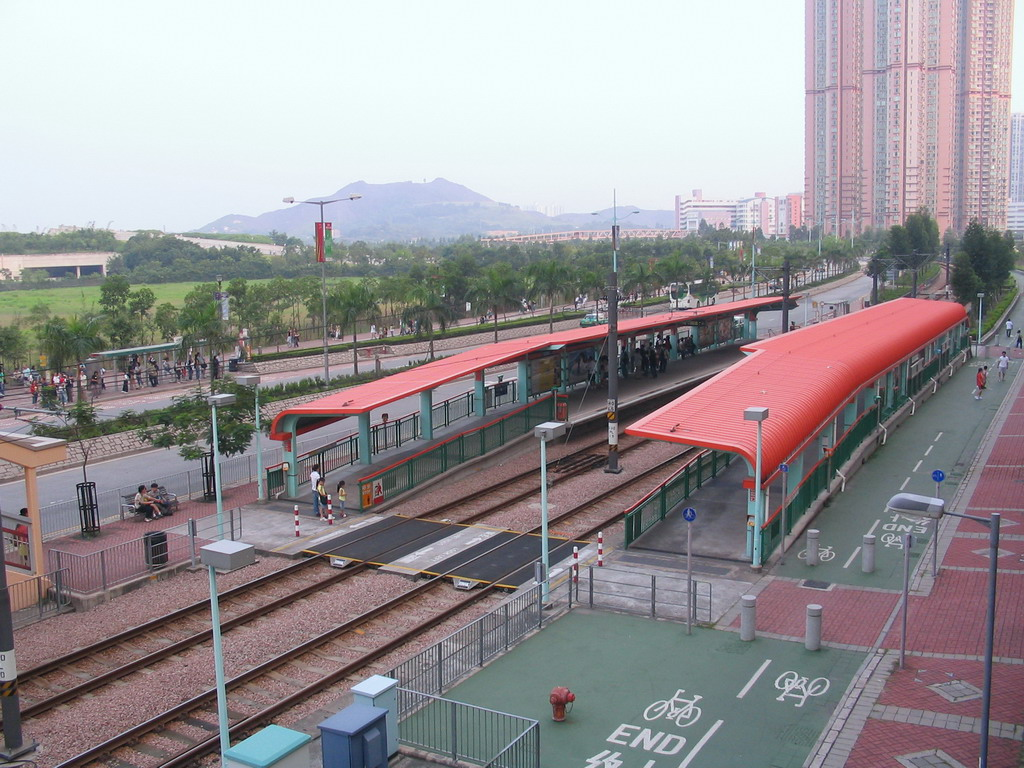
- Appearance of Wetland Park stop

General information
- Location: Hong Kong Wetland Park; Hong Kong
- System: MTR Light Rail stop
- Owner: KCR Corporation
- Operator: MTR Corporation
- Line: 705 706
- Platforms: 2 side platforms
- Tracks: 2
- Connections: Bus, minibus

Construction
- Structure type: At-grade
- Accessible: yes

Other information
- Station code: WEP (English code); 530 (Digital code)
- Fare zone: 5A

History
- Opened: 7 December 2003; 22 years ago

Services
Preceding stop	MTR Light Rail	Following stop
Tin Sau Anticlockwise around Tin Shui Wai	705	Tin Heng One-way operation
Tin Heng One-way operation	706	Tin Sau Clockwise around Tin Shui Wai
Location
- Location within MTR

Wetland Park (Chinese: 濕地公園) is an MTR Light Rail stop. It is located at ground level beside Wetland Park Road, between Hong Kong Wetland Park and Grandeur Terrace, in Tin Shui Wai, Yuen Long District. It began service on 7 December 2003 and belongs to Zone 5A.

== See also ==
- Hong Kong Wetland Park
