= Wang Yat (constituency) =

Hong Kong constituency

- Elected constituency for the Yuen Long District Council
- Boundary of Wang Yat in Yuen Long District
- District: Yuen Long
- Legislative Council constituency: New Territories North
- Population: 18,418 (2019)
- Electorate: 11,928 (2019)

Current constituency
- Created: 2011
- Number of members: One
- Member: Vacant
- Created from: Wang King

Wang Yat (Chinese: 宏逸) is one of the 39 constituencies in the Yuen Long District of Hong Kong. The constituency returns one district councillor to the Yuen Long District Council, with an election every four years.

Wang Yat constituency is loosely based on Grandeur Terrace and part of Tin Yat Estate in Tin Shui Wai with estimated population of 20,242.

== Councillors represented ==
Election	Member	Party
2011	Yiu Kwok-wai	FTU
2019	Mo Kai-hong→Vacant	Nonpartisan

== Election results ==
=== 2010s ===
Yuen Long District Council Election, 2019: Wang Yat
Party	Candidate	Votes	%	±%
Nonpartisan	Mo Kai-hong	5,100	62.16	
FTU	Yiu Kwok-wai	2,849	34.73	
Nonpartisan	Cho Kin-for	204	2.49	
Nonpartisan	Kwan Ka-lai	51	0.62	
Majority		2,251	27.43	
Turnout		8,217	68.95	
Nonpartisan gain from FTU		Swing		

Yuen Long District Council Election, 2015: Wang Yat
Party	Candidate	Votes	%	±%
FTU	Yiu Kwok-wai	Unopposed		
FTU hold		Swing		

Yuen Long District Council Election, 2011: Wang Yat
Party	Candidate	Votes	%	±%
FTU (DAB)	Yiu Kwok-wai	2,274	66.82	
Democratic	Ng Yuk-ying	987	29.00	
Nonpartisan	Ho Ka-hong	142	4.17	
Majority		1,287	37.82	
Turnout		3,403	37.72	
FTU win (new seat)				
