= MTR Light Rail Routes 705 and 706 =

MTR Light Rail Route 705 and 706
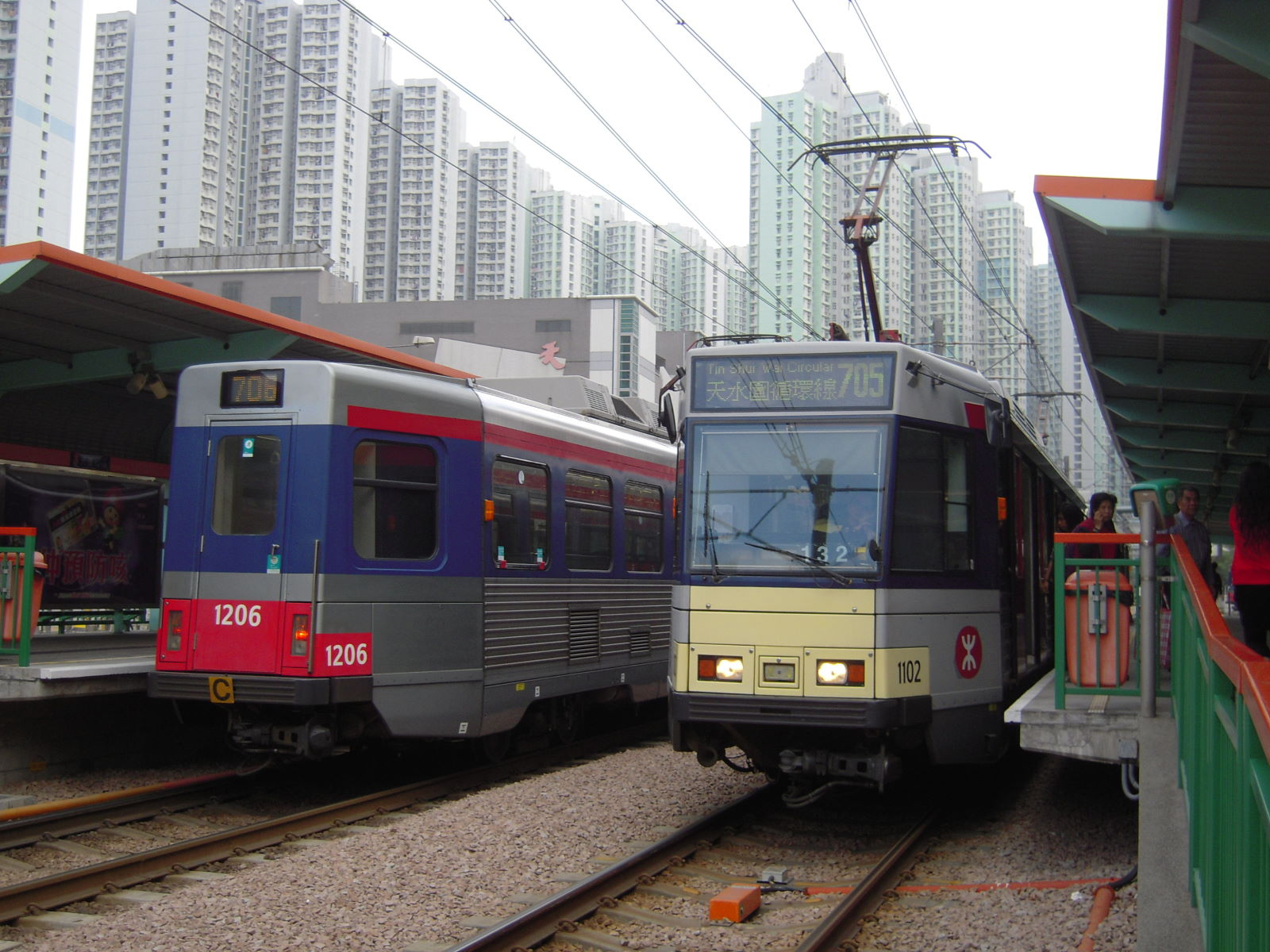
- Light rail vehicles of routes 706 (left) and 705 (right)

Overview
- Owner: KCR Corporation
- Locale: Tin Shui Wai
- Stations: 17

Service
- System: MTR Light Rail
- Operator: MTR Corporation

History
- Opened: 9 April 2004; 22 years ago (Route 706); 22 August 2004; 21 years ago (Route 705)

Technical
- Character: At grade and Elevated
- Track gauge: 1,435 mm (4 ft 8 1/2 in) standard gauge
- Electrification: 750 V DC Overhead line
- Operating speed: 70 km/h (43 mph) (Maximum)

Route 705 and Route 706 are Light Rail loop services of the MTR system in Tin Shui Wai in the northwestern New Territories, Hong Kong. Route 705 operates in an anticlockwise direction (i.e. the inner loop), and commenced service on 22 August 2004. Route 706 serves the clockwise direction (i.e. the outer loop), and began running on 9 April 2004. The two routes are marked as Tin Shui Wai Circular on station signage.

The line is a loop, starting at Tin Shui Wai, an interchange with the Tuen Ma line at Tin Shui Wai station. It then runs along Tin Shing Road, continues between the Tin Fu and Tin Ching public housing estates and along Wetland Park Road, reaching the northern tip of the town. It returns along Grandeur Terrace into Tin Shui Road, passing Tin Wah Road and the Tin Shui Wai Park and finally arrives back to Tin Shui Wai stop.

Route Interchanges
751 761P Tuen Ma line

== Stops ==
=== Route 705 ===
Fare Zone	Name	Chinese name	Connections
4	Tin Shui Wai	天水圍	706 751 Tuen Ma line ( Tin Shui Wai)
4	Tin Tsz	天慈	706 751
4	Tin Wu	天湖	706 751
4	Ginza	銀座	706 751
4	Tin Wing	天榮	706 751
5A	Tin Yuet	天悅	706
5A	Tin Sau	天秀	706
5A	Wetland Park	濕地公園	706
5A	Tin Heng	天恆	706
5A	Tin Yat	天逸	706 751(to Yau Oi) 761P (to Yuen Long)
5A	Tin Fu	天富	706 751 761P
5A	Chung Fu	頌富	706 751 761P
4	Tin Shui	天瑞	706 761P
4	Locwood	樂湖	706 761P
4	Tin Yiu	天耀	706 761P
4	Tin Shui Wai	天水圍	706 751 Tuen Ma line ( Tin Shui Wai)

=== Route 706 ===
Fare Zone	Name	Chinese name	Connections
4	Tin Shui Wai	天水圍	705 751 Tuen Ma line ( Tin Shui Wai)
4	Tin Yiu	天耀	705 761P
4	Locwood	樂湖	705 761P
4	Tin Shui	天瑞	705 761P
5A	Chung Fu	頌富	705 751 761P
5A	Tin Fu	天富	705 751 761P
5A	Tin Yat	天逸	705 (Continuing) 751 761P (Terminus)
5A	Tin Heng	天恆	705
5A	Wetland Park	濕地公園	705
5A	Tin Sau	天秀	705
5A	Tin Yuet	天悅	705
4	Tin Wing	天榮	705 751
4	Ginza	銀座	705 751
4	Tin Wu	天湖	705 751
4	Tin Tsz	天慈	705 751
4	Tin Shui Wai	天水圍	705 751 Tuen Ma line ( Tin Shui Wai)
