= Tin Yiu stop =

Coordinates: 22°27′01″N 114°00′10″E

Tin Yiu 天耀
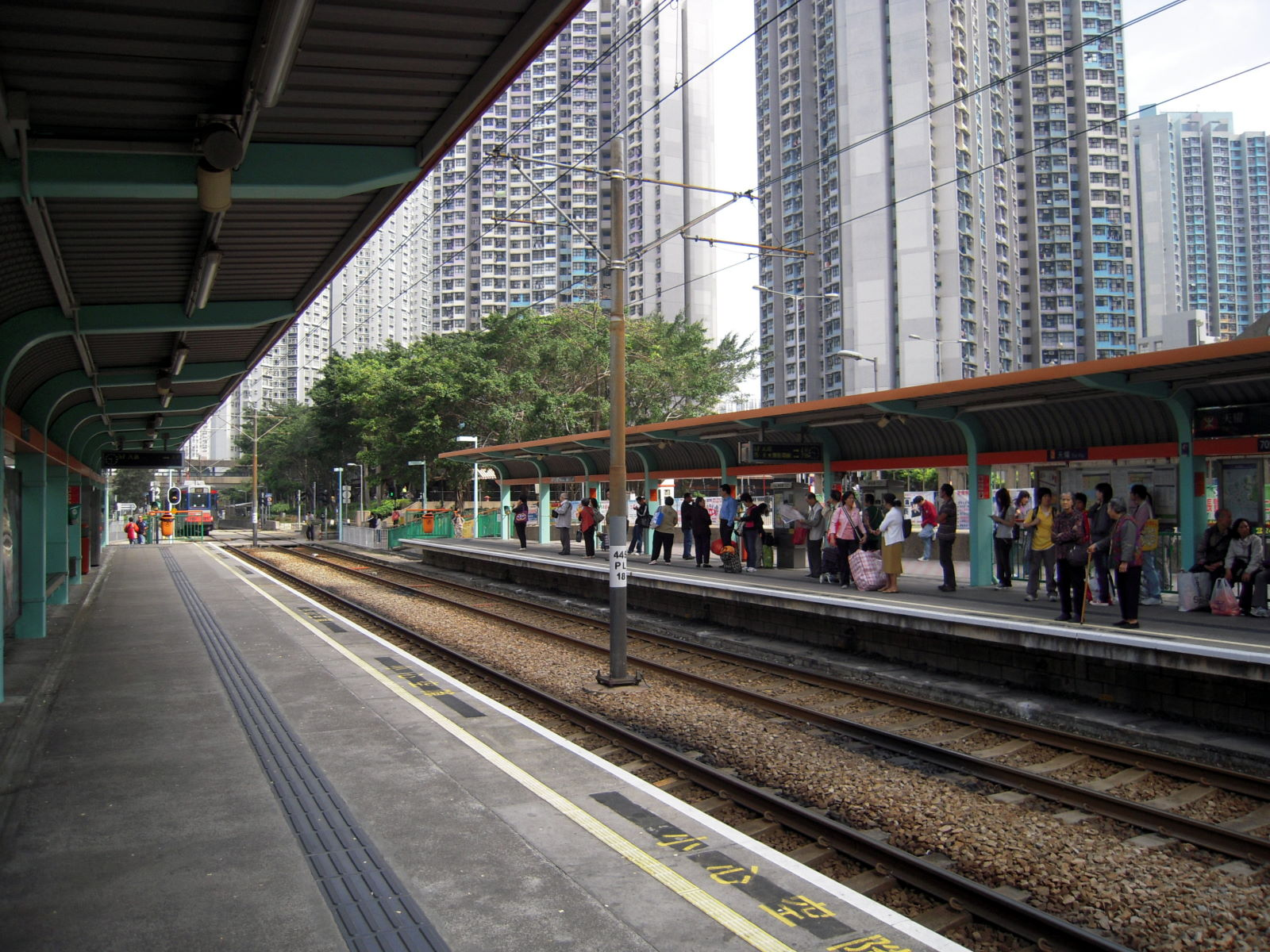
- Tin Yiu stop's Platform

General information
- Location: Tin Yiu Estate; Hong Kong
- System: MTR Light Rail stop
- Owner: KCR Corporation
- Operator: MTR Corporation
- Lines: Light Rail routes 705, 706 and 761P
- Platforms: 2 (2 side platforms)
- Tracks: 2
- Connections: Bus, minibus

Construction
- Structure type: At-grade
- Accessible: yes

Other information
- Station code: TIY (English code); 445 (Digital code)
- Fare zone: 4

History
- Opened: 10 January 1993; 33 years ago

Services
Preceding stop	MTR Light Rail	Following stop
Tin Shui Wai Anticlockwise around Tin Shui Wai	705	Locwood One-way operation
Tin Shui Wai One-way operation	706	Locwood Clockwise around Tin Shui Wai
Locwood towards Tin Yat	761P	Hang Mei Tsuen towards Yuen Long
Location
- Location within MTR

Tin Yiu (Chinese: 天耀) is an MTR Light Rail stop. It is located at ground level at Tin Shui Road near Tin Yiu Estate in Tin Shui Wai, Yuen Long District. It began service on 10 January 1993 and belongs to Zone 4. It serves Tin Yiu Estate and Tin Shing Court.

== History ==
The station opened on 10 January 1993 as part of the 2.7-km Tin Shui Wai Extension project, built by KCR to serve the developing Tin Shui Wai New Town. It was initially served by Route 721 from Tin Shui Wai to Yuen Long. Two months later, on 27 March 1993, an additional service (route 722) commenced between Tin Shui Wai and Siu Hong.

Tin Yiu stop no longer provides direct service to Tuen Mun. Passengers must take the Tuen Ma Line or transfer to route 751 at Hang Mei Tsuen stop.

== Physical description ==
Tin Yiu stop has two covered, open-air side platforms, each long enough to accommodate a two-car train. The shelters cover the full length of both platforms.

The platforms can be entered from both their north and south ends. The northern ends of both platforms are accessible by ramps, whereas stairs are provided at the southern ends. There are pedestrian level crossings at either end of the station.

The light rail stop is located next to the Tin Yiu Bus Terminus.

== Gallery ==
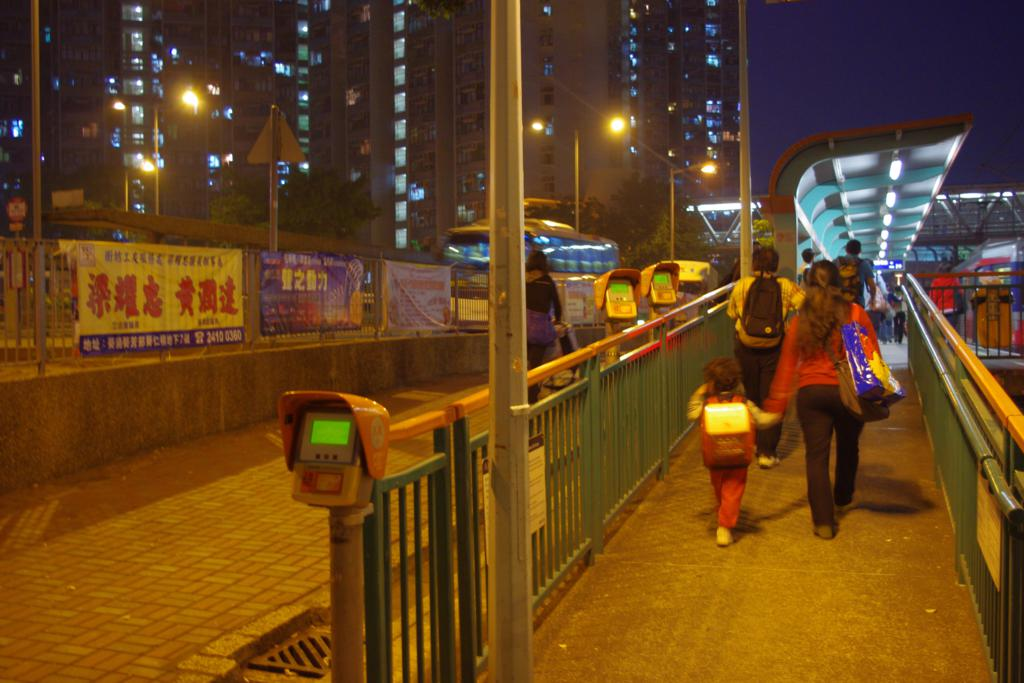
Tin Yiu stop Entrance at night

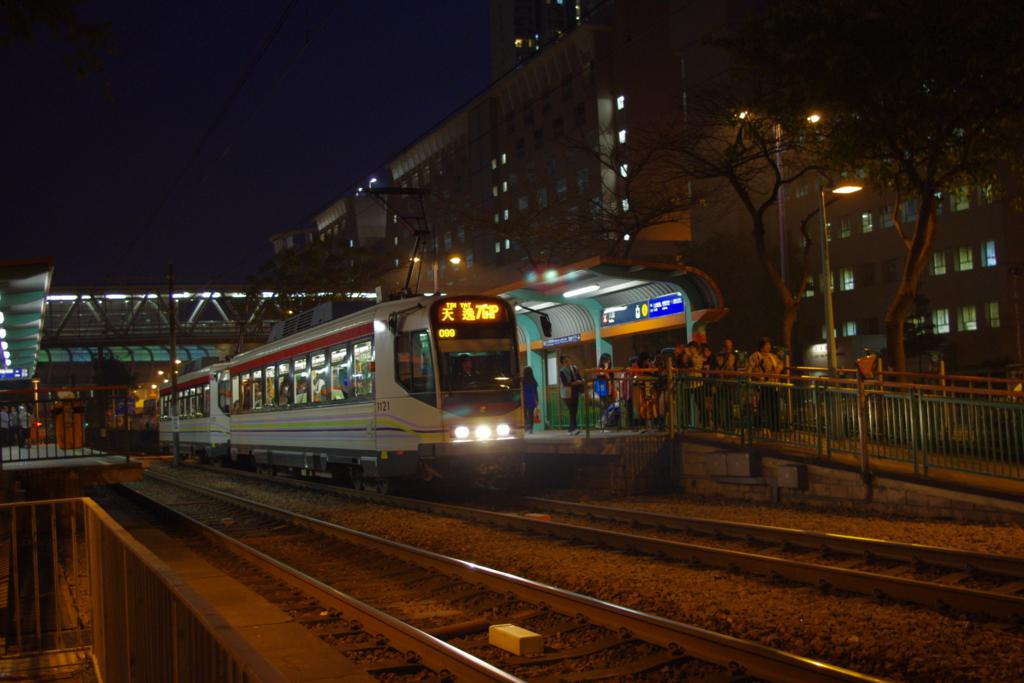
Tin Yiu stop at night with Phase IV vehicle

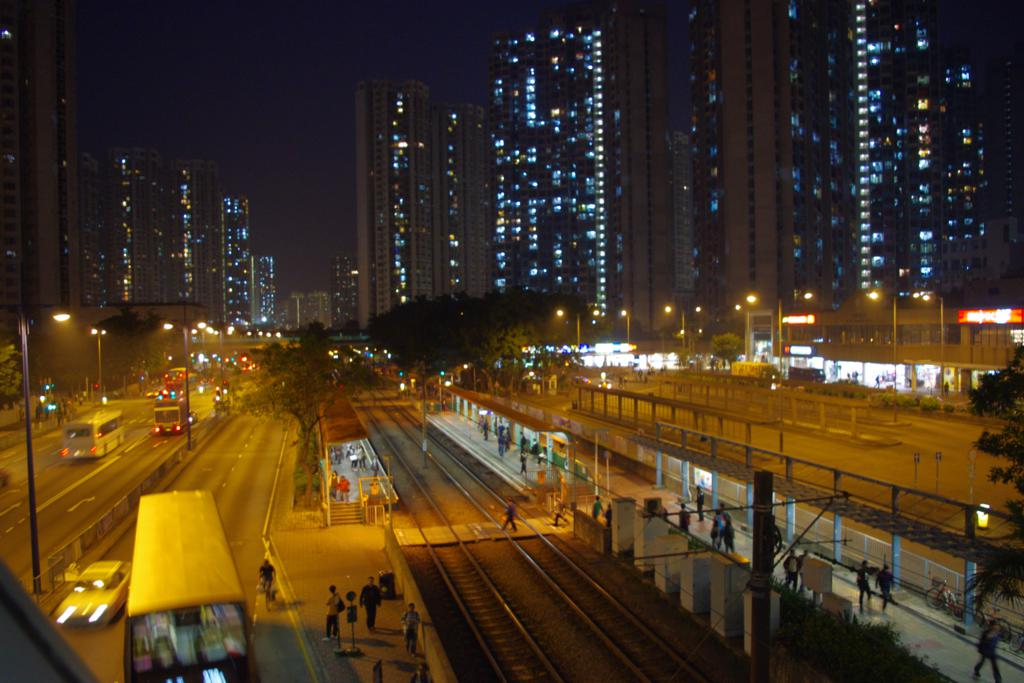
Tin Yiu stop at night time as viewed from overpass
