= Tin Heng stop =

Coordinates: 22°28′11″N 114°00′03″E

Tin Heng 天恆
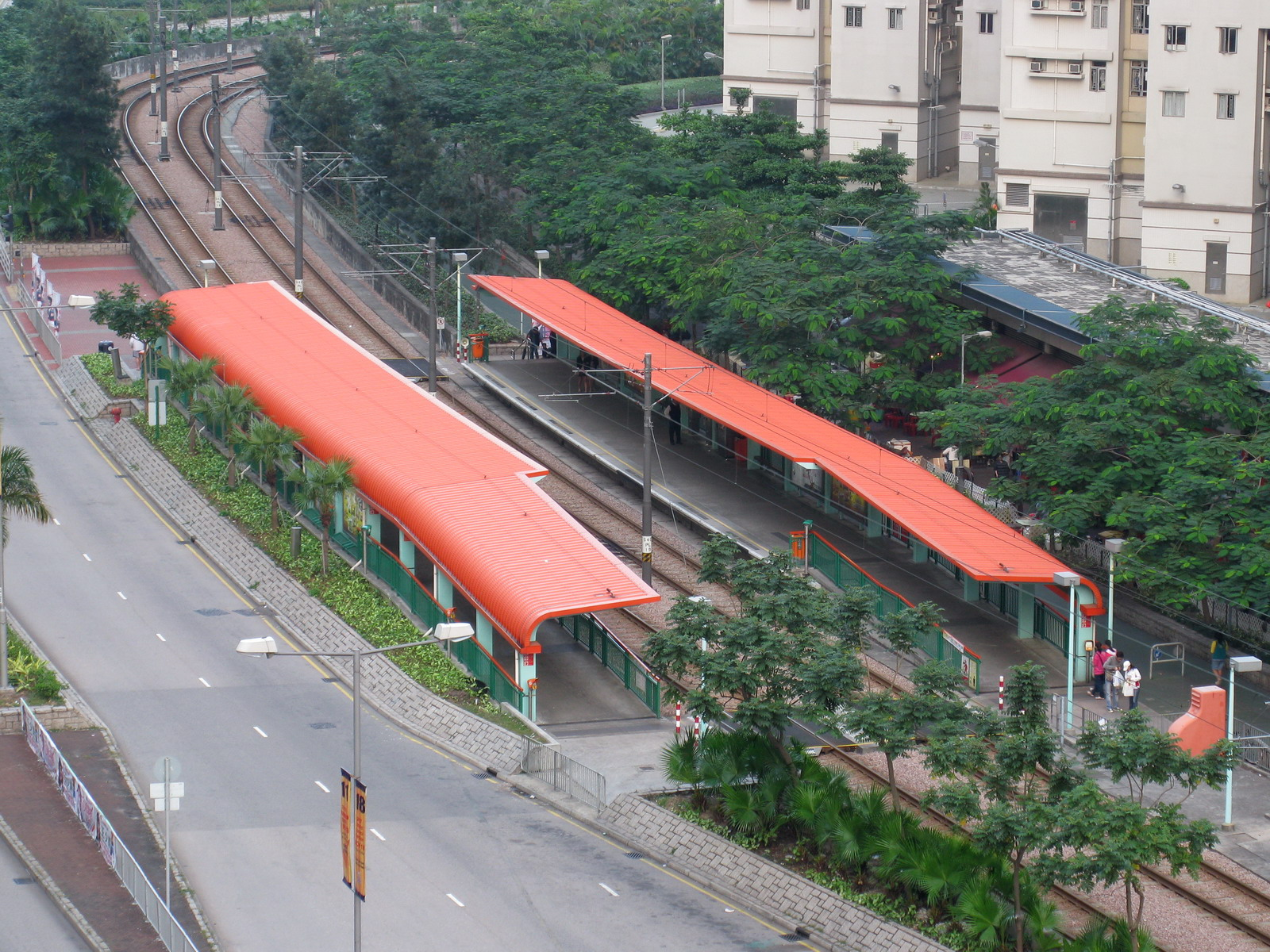
- Appearance of Tin Heng stop

General information
- Location: Tin Heng Estate; Hong Kong
- System: MTR Light Rail stop
- Owner: KCR Corporation
- Operator: MTR Corporation
- Line: 705 706
- Platforms: 2 side platforms
- Tracks: 2
- Connections: Bus, minibus

Construction
- Structure type: At-grade
- Accessible: yes

Other information
- Station code: THE (English code); 540 (Digital code)
- Fare zone: 5A

History
- Opened: 7 December 2003; 22 years ago

Services
| Preceding stop | MTR Light Rail | Following stop |
|---|---|---|
| Tin Yat Anticlockwise around Tin Shui Wai | 705 | Wetland Park One-way operation |
| Tin Yat One-way operation | 706 | Wetland Park Clockwise around Tin Shui Wai |
Location
- Location within MTR

Tin Heng (traditional Chinese: 天恆; simplified Chinese: 天恒; Jyutping: tin1 hang4) is an MTR Light Rail station. It is at ground level of Tin Shui Road near Tin Heng Estate, in Tin Shui Wai, Yuen Long District, Hong Kong. It began service on 7 December 2003 and it belongs to Zone 5A.
