= Tin Shui Wai stop =

MTR Light Rail stop in Hong Kong

Coordinates: 22°26′52″N 114°00′15″E

Tin Shui Wai 天水圍
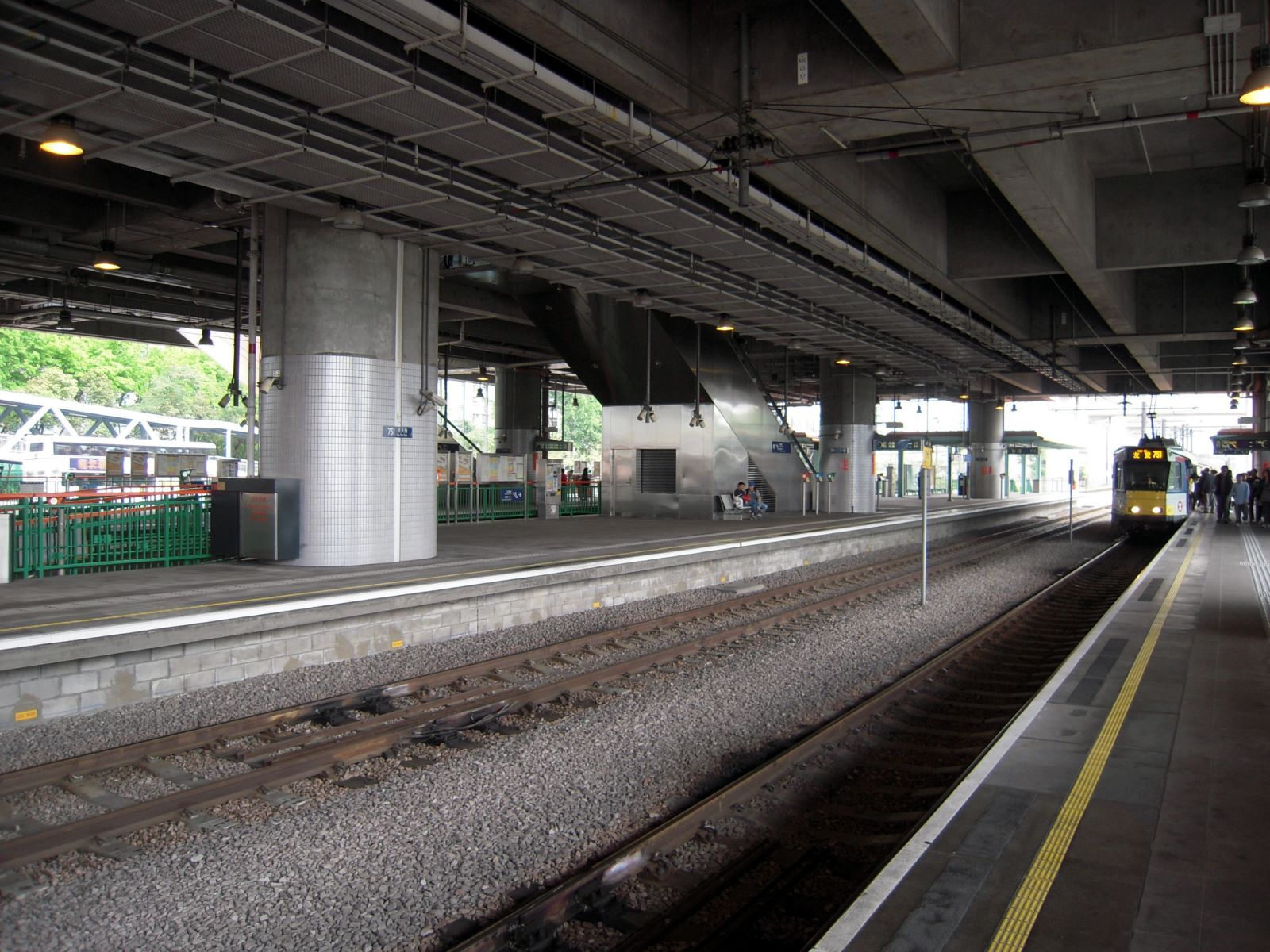
- Tin Shui Wai stop platform 2

General information
- Location: Tin Shui Wai; Yuen Long District; Hong Kong
- System: MTR Light Rail stop
- Owner: KCR Corporation
- Operator: MTR Corporation
- Line: 705 706 751 751P
- Platforms: 3 side platforms
- Tracks: 3
- Connections: Tuen Ma line ( Tin Shui Wai); Bus, minibus

Construction
- Structure type: At-grade
- Accessible: yes

Other information
- Station code: TSL (English code); 430 (Digital code)
- Fare zone: Zone 4

History
- Opened: 7 December 2003; 22 years ago

Services
Preceding stop	MTR Light Rail	Following stop
Tin Tsz Anticlockwise around Tin Shui Wai	705	Tin Yiu One-way operation
Tin Tsz One-way operation	706	Tin Yiu Clockwise around Tin Shui Wai
Hang Mei Tsuen towards Yau Oi	751	Tin Tsz towards Tin Yat
Terminus	751P Peak hours only	Tin Tsz towards Tin Yat
Preceding station	MTR	Following station
Siu Hong towards Tuen Mun	Tuen Ma line transfer at Tin Shui Wai	Long Ping towards Wu Kai Sha
Location
- Location within MTR

Tin Shui Wai (Chinese: 天水圍) is a Light Rail stop and interchange station for Tuen Ma line. This Light Rail stop is located at Tin Fuk Road in Tin Shui Wai, at the ground level of the MTR Tin Shui Wai station.

The former Tin Shui Wai Terminus was renamed Tin Wing stop on 1 August 2003 to avoid confusion with this Light Rail stop.

== Station layout ==
C MTR station	Tin Shui Wai Concourse (Tuen Ma line)
Platform (Ground)	Exit	Tin Fuk Road, Public Transport Interchange
Platform (Ground)	Platform 1	705 Tin Shui Wai Loop (anti-clockwise)
Platform (Ground)	Platform 2	751 751P towards Tin Yat
Platform (Ground)	Platform 3	706 Tin Shui Wai Loop (clockwise); 751 towards Yau Oi; 751P termination platform
