= Tin Yat stop =

Major LRT Terminus in Hong Kong

Tin Yat 天逸
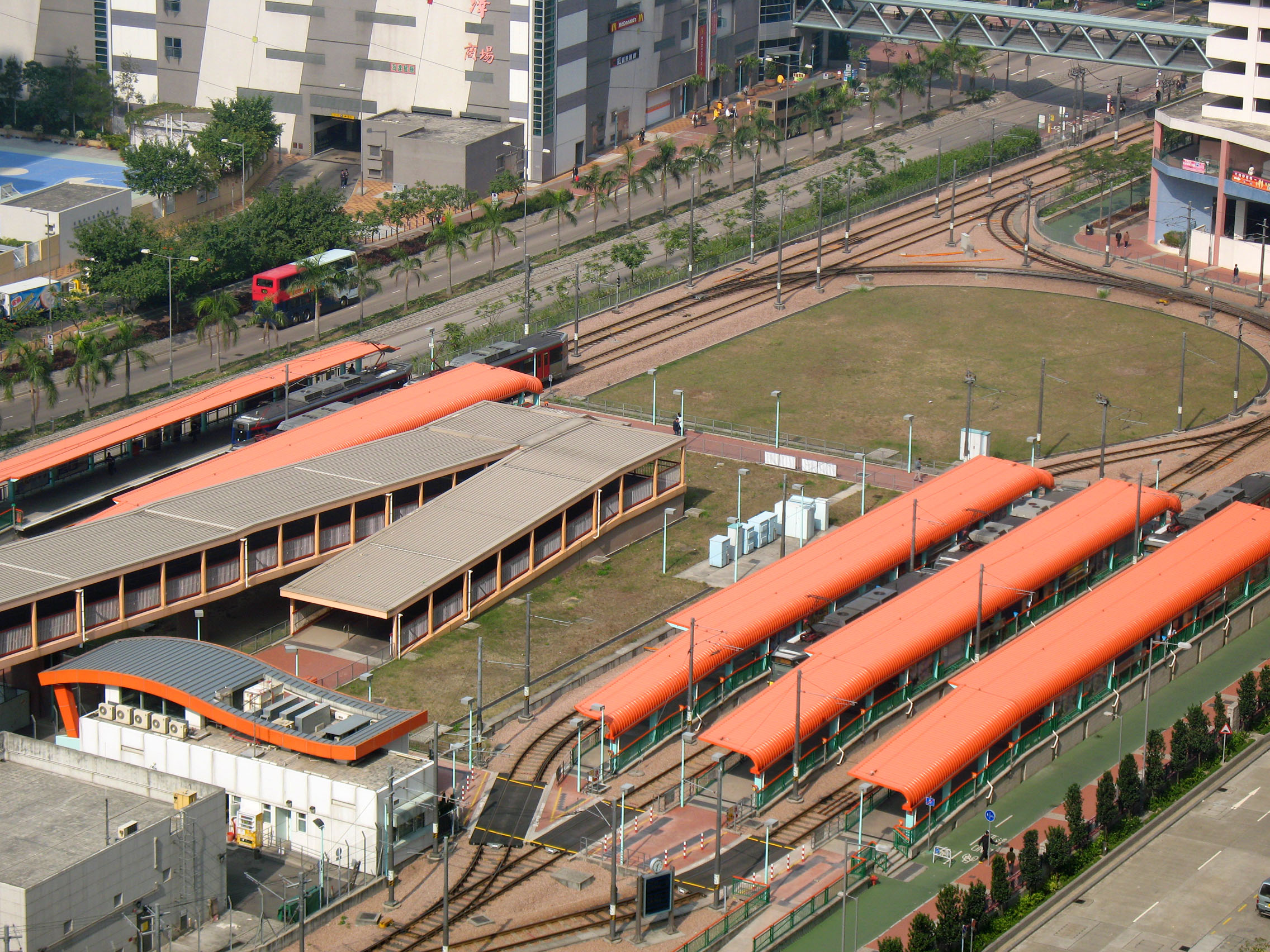
- Tin Yat stop's Platform

General information
- Location: Tin Yat Estate; Yuen Long District, Hong Kong
- Coordinates: 22°28′02″N 113°59′56″E
- System: MTR Light Rail stop
- Owner: KCR Corporation
- Operator: MTR Corporation
- Line: 705 706 751 751P 761P
- Platforms: 5 side platforms
- Tracks: 5
- Connections: Bus, minibus

Construction
- Structure type: At-grade
- Accessible: yes

Other information
- Station code: TYA (English code); 550 (Digital code)
- Fare zone: 5A

History
- Opened: 7 December 2003; 22 years ago

Services
Preceding stop	MTR Light Rail	Following stop
Tin Fu Anticlockwise around Tin Shui Wai	705	Tin Heng One-way operation
Tin Fu One-way operation	706	Tin Heng Clockwise around Tin Shui Wai
Tin Fu towards Yau Oi	751	Terminus
Tin Fu towards Tin Shui Wai	751P Peak hours only	Terminus
Terminus	761P	Tin Fu towards Yuen Long
Location
- Location within MTR

Tin Yat (Chinese: 天逸) is one of the MTR Light Rail stops. It is located at ground level at the centre of Tin Shui Road and Tin Sau Road in Tin Shui Wai, Yuen Long District, Hong Kong. It began service on 7 December 2003 and belongs to Zone 5A.

The stop has five platforms; platform 3 is not in use. Platform 1 is the terminus of routes 751 and 751P, while platform 2 is the terminus of route 761P (towards Yuen Long). Platforms 4 and 5 are the southward and northward through platforms respectively, used by routes 705 (southbound), 706 (northbound) and 761P (towards Yuen Long). There is also a Light Rail customer service centre.
