= Results breakdown of the 2023 Hong Kong local elections =

2023 Hong Kong local elections
← 2019	12 October 2023	2027 →
Party	Leader	Vote %	Seats	+/–
DAB	Gary Chan	41.58	41	+20
FTU	Ng Chau-pei	17.61	18	+13
NPP	Regina Ip	8.52	5	+5
BPA	Lo Wai-kwok	5.04	4	+1
PP	Christine Fong	2.01	1	−2
New Prospect	Marco Liu	1.83	1	+1
Liberal	Tommy Cheung	1.67	3	−2
FPHE	Wong Kwan	1.52	2	−1
This lists parties that won seats. See the complete results below.

This is the results breakdown of the 2023 District Council elections in Hong Kong.

== Geographical Constituencies ==
=== Central and Western ===
Central
Party	Candidate	Votes	%	±%
DAB	Shih Jan Neol	3,859	32.38	
Liberal	Karl Fung Kar-leung	3,061	25.69	
NPP	Kwok Kit-chun	2,708	22.72	
Nonpartisan	Pang Shun-man	1,684	14.13	
Nonpartisan	Christopher Tse Chin	605	5.08	
Total valid votes		11,917		
Turnout				
Registered electors		47,869		
DAB win (new seat)				
Liberal win (new seat)				

Western
Party	Candidate	Votes	%	±%
DAB	Lau Tin-ching	7,051	40.49	
Nonpartisan	Mandy Wong Sin-man	3,888	22.32	
Nonpartisan	Lee Chor-ting	2,851	16.37	
NPP	Ng Ka-chiu	2,694	15.47	
Independent	Lau Ka-ngong	932	5.35	
Total valid votes		17,416		
Turnout				
Registered electors		65,336		
DAB win (new seat)				
Nonpartisan win (new seat)				

=== Wan Chai ===
Wan Chai
Party	Candidate	Votes	%	±%
DAB	Muk Ka-chun	6,691	32.78	
Independent	Lee Pik-yee	6,331	31.01	
NPP	Wong Sau-tung	3,392	16.61	
Liberal	Sung Chih-ling	3,043	14.91	
Nonpartisan	Raymond Lee	957	4.69	
Total valid votes		20,414		
Turnout				
Registered electors		76,730		
DAB win (new seat)				
Independent win (new seat)				

=== Eastern ===
Tai Pak
Party	Candidate	Votes	%	±%
DAB	Eddie Ting Kong-ho	9,328	35.07	
Liberal	Kenny Yuen Kin-chung	7,844	29.49	
NPP	Paul Lui Yau-tak	4,983	18.73	
FTU	So Ka-lok	4,446	16.71	
Total valid votes		26,601		
Turnout				
Registered electors		97,505		
DAB win (new seat)				
Liberal win (new seat)				

Hong Wan
Party	Candidate	Votes	%	±%
DAB	Lee Ching-har	14,764	47.04	
FTU	Ng Ching-ching	9,721	30.97	
NPP	Lam Tsz-hung	6,903	21.99	
Total valid votes		31,388		
Turnout				
Registered electors		116,238		
DAB win (new seat)				
FTU win (new seat)				

Chai Wan
Party	Candidate	Votes	%	±%
DAB	Elaine Chik Kit-ling	14,018	43.40	
FTU	Stanley Ho Ngai-kam	12,771	39.54	
NPP	Chau Cheuk-yin	5,509	17.06	
Total valid votes		32,298		
Turnout				
Registered electors		115,005		
DAB win (new seat)				
FTU win (new seat)				

=== Southern ===
Southern District southeast
Party	Candidate	Votes	%	±%
FTU	Chan Wing-yan	6,472	29.67	
Liberal	Jonathan Leung Chun	5,626	25.79	
DAB	Lam Ho-wai	5,100	23.38	
NPP	Van Kong Cheuk-chi	4,615	21.16	
Total valid votes		21,813		
Turnout				
Registered electors		75,965		
FTU win (new seat)				
Liberal win (new seat)				

Southern District Northwest
Party	Candidate	Votes	%	±%
DAB	Cheung Wai-nam	11,693	56.17	
FTU	Lam Wing-yan	4,473	21.49	
NPP	Timary Chui Tim-wai	3,012	14.47	
BPA	Ng Yat-fung	1,640	7.88	
Total valid votes		20,818		
Turnout				
Registered electors		77,933		
DAB win (new seat)				
FTU win (new seat)				

=== Yau Tsim Mong ===
Yau Tsim Mong South
Party	Candidate	Votes	%	±%
Nonpartisan	Haywood Guan Weixi	6,505	39.54	
DAB	Chris Ip Ngo-tung	6,321	38.42	
Nonpartisan	To Shun-wing	1,628	9.89	
Nonpartisan	Alex Ilyas Mohammad	968	5.88	
NPP	Baljinder Singh	778	4.73	
Nonpartisan	Babu Muhammad Fakhrul Islam	253	1.54	
Total valid votes		16,453		
Turnout				
Registered electors		61,294		
Nonpartisan win (new seat)				
DAB win (new seat)				

Yau Tsim Mong North
Party	Candidate	Votes	%	±%
DAB	Lee Ka-hin	6,496	34.08	
BPA	Li Sze-man	5,848	30.68	
FTU	Lulu Lai Yee-ting	4,377	22.96	
Nonpartisan	Yip Kwok-shan	2,342	12.29	
Total valid votes		19,063		
Turnout				
Registered electors		73,736		
DAB win (new seat)				
BPA win (new seat)				

=== Sham Shui Po ===
Sham Shui Po West
Party	Candidate	Votes	%	±%
DAB	Ho Kwan-chau	15,492	45.13	
Nonpartisan	Wu Sze-man	9,289	27.06	
BPA (KWND)	Wong Wing-wai	6,801	19.81	
Nonpartisan	Chung Yu-hin	2,744	7.99	
Total valid votes		34,326		
Turnout				
Registered electors		123,786		
DAB win (new seat)				
Nonpartisan win (new seat)				

Sham Shui Po East
Party	Candidate	Votes	%	±%
DAB	Raymond Lam Wai-man	10,529	37.06	
BPA	Chan Kwok-wai	6,879	24.21	
FLU	Cheung Ying-ying	5,961	20.98	
Nonpartisan	Virginia Lee Wing-cheung	5,041	17.74	
Total valid votes		28,410		
Turnout				
Registered electors		109,668		
DAB win (new seat)				
BPA win (new seat)				

=== Kowloon City ===
Kowloon City North
Party	Candidate	Votes	%	±%
Nonpartisan	Lam Pok	12,361	45.30	
DAB	Kwan Ho-yeung	9,343	34.32	
FTU	Tang Hou-tong	3,556	13.03	
Independent	Jennifer Lam Suk-fong	2,026	7.43	
Total valid votes		27,286		
Turnout				
Turnout				
Registered electors		97,230		
Nonpartisan win (new seat)				
DAB win (new seat)				

Kowloon City South
Party	Candidate	Votes	%	±%
DAB	Ng Po-keung	13,947		
BPA	Lee Chiu-yu	10,917		
New Prospect	Ma Chi-hang	3,582		
Independent	Tse Man-ting	2,226		
Total valid votes		30,672		
Turnout				
Registered electors		116,041		
DAB win (new seat)				
BPA win (new seat)				

=== Wong Tai Sin ===
Wong Tai Sin East
Party	Candidate	Votes	%	±%
FTU	Tam Mei-po	12,337	35.63	
DAB	Yuet Ngai-keung	9,029	26.07	
Nonpartisan	Mok Ka-kit	8,817	25.46	
New Prospect	So Ching-yin	4,447	12.84	
Total valid votes		34,630		
Turnout				
Registered electors		121,593		
FTU win (new seat)				
DAB win (new seat)				

Wong Tai Sin West
Party	Candidate	Votes	%	±%
DAB	Poon Cheuk-bun	15,026	36.11	
Nonpartisan	Yeung Nok-hin	13,469	32.37	
FTU	Li Chung-chak	7,449	17.90	
New Prospect	Koby Wong Lok-yin	5,662	13.61	
Total valid votes		34,630		
Turnout				
Registered electors		147,313		
DAB win (new seat)				
Nonpartisan win (new seat)				

=== Kwun Tong ===
Kwun Tong Southeast
Party	Candidate	Votes	%	±%
FTU	Kan Ming-tung	12,269	39.59	
FPHE	Pang Chi-sang	10,181	32.85	
DAB	Chan Ka-man	8,538	27.55	
Total valid votes		30,988		
Turnout				
Registered electors		107,726		
FTU win (new seat)				
FPHE win (new seat)				

Kwun Tong Central
Party	Candidate	Votes	%	±%
DAB	Wilson Or Chong-shing	10,912	43.60	
Independent	Ma Yat-chiu	6,094	24.35	
Nonpartisan	Cheung Lok-lam	5,797	23.16	
Nonpartisan	Ming Wai-kit	2,222	8.88	
Total valid votes		30,988		
Turnout				
Registered electors		100,434		
DAB win (new seat)				
Independent win (new seat)				

Kwun Tong North
Party	Candidate	Votes	%	±%
DAB	Cheung Pui-kong	18,420	53.62	
Nonpartisan	Fu Pik-chun	11,787	34.31	
Nonpartisan	Wong Hiu-tung	2,460	7.16	
Nonpartisan	Lo Man	1,687	4.91	
Total valid votes		32,815		
Turnout				
Registered electors		101,521		
DAB win (new seat)				
Nonpartisan win (new seat)				

Kwun Tong West
Party	Candidate	Votes	%	±%
DAB	Tam Siu-cheuk	16,836	51.31	
FTU	Lee Ka-hang	9,801	29.87	
Nonpartisan	Pan Chuwen	3,556	10.84	
Nonpartisan	Matthew Hui Man-fung	2,622	7.99	
Total valid votes		32,815		
Turnout				
Registered electors		108,795		
DAB win (new seat)				
FTU win (new seat)				

=== Tsuen Wan ===
Tsuen Wan Northwest
Party	Candidate	Votes	%	±%
DAB	Wong Kai-chun	10,213	45.20	
FTU	Kot Siu-yuen	9,783	43.30	
Nonpartisan	Chung Chin-to	1,641	7.26	
Nonpartisan	Kevin Wong Chiu-wah	959	4.24	
Total valid votes		22,596		
Turnout				
Registered electors		88,781		
DAB win (new seat)				
FTU win (new seat)				

Tsuen Wan Southeast
Party	Candidate	Votes	%	±%
DAB	Ng Chun-yu	10,453	41.73	
FPHE	Sam Fung Cheuk-sum	7,563	30.19	
FTU	Ha Wing-ka	5,387	21.50	
Nonpartisan	Jesse Ho Yee-keung	1,647	6.57	
Total valid votes		25,050		
Turnout				
Registered electors		89,461		
DAB win (new seat)				
FPHE win (new seat)				

=== Tuen Mun ===
Tuen Mun East
Party	Candidate	Votes	%	±%
DAB	Yip Man-pan	12,336	51.63	
FTU	Fung Pui-yin	8,837	36.98	
Nonpartisan	Chan Chi-man	2,722	11.39	
Total valid votes		11,917		
Turnout				
Registered electors		94,443		
DAB win (new seat)				
FTU win (new seat)				

Tuen Mun West
Party	Candidate	Votes	%	±%
DAB	Chung Kin-fung	9,426	31.33	
FTU	Tsui Fan	8,608	28.61	
Roundtable	Chong Ho-fung	7,149	23.76	
Nonpartisan	Innes Tang Tak-shing	4,903	16.30	
Total valid votes		11,917		
Turnout				
Registered electors		108,195		
win (new seat)				
win (new seat)				

Tuen Mun North
Party	Candidate	Votes	%	±%
DAB	Lai Ka-man	14,707	51.19	
NPP	So Ka-man	7,550	26.28	
FLU	Chan Man-luen-ying	6,475	22.54	
Total valid votes		11,917		
Turnout				
Registered electors		107,509		
DAB win (new seat)				
NPP win (new seat)				

=== Yuen Long ===
Yuen Long Town Centre
Party	Candidate	Votes	%	±%
DAB	Riben Li Kai-lap	14,702	70.85	
Nonpartisan	Sei Chun-hing	3,588	17.29	
Nonpartisan	Albert Chan Chie-chung	2,460	11.86	
Total valid votes		20,750		
Turnout				
Registered electors		84,076		
DAB win (new seat)				
Nonpartisan win (new seat)				

Yuen Long Rural East
Party	Candidate	Votes	%	±%
Independent	Leung Ming-kin	10,401	47.50	
DAB	Chui Kwan-siu	6,447	29.45	
BPA	Cheung Kung-fat	5,047	23.05	
Total valid votes		20,750		
Turnout				
Registered electors		80,193		
win (new seat)				
win (new seat)				

Tin Shui Wai South and Ping Ha
Party	Candidate	Votes	%	±%
DAB	So Yuen	12,388	51.57	
New Prospect	Yankie Chan Yin-kwan	4,638	19.31	
Nonpartisan	Tang Wai-kin	4,365	18.17	
Nonpartisan	Chan Sze-ching	2,633	10.96	
Total valid votes		24,024		
Turnout				
Registered electors		90,684		
DAB win (new seat)				
New Prospect win (new seat)				

Tin Shui Wai North
Party	Candidate	Votes	%	±%
FTU	Yiu Kwok-wai	13,540	46.94	
DAB	Fennie Lai Yuet-kwan	11,418	39.59	
BPA	To Ho-shun	3,885	13.47	
Total valid votes		28,843		
Turnout				
Registered electors		116,163		
FTU win (new seat)				
DAB win (new seat)				

=== North ===
Wu Tip Shan
Party	Candidate	Votes	%	±%
DAB	Yiu Ming	20,053	69.42	
Nonpartisan	Sung Ping-ping	3,820	13.22	
New Prospect	Li Ka-chun	3,051	10.56	
Nonpartisan	Wu Yuk-ching	1,964	6.80	
Total valid votes		28,888		
Turnout				
Registered electors		107,322		
DAB win (new seat)				
Nonpartisan win (new seat)				

Robin's Nest
Party	Candidate	Votes	%	±%
DAB	Ko Wai-kei	10,212	39.15	
FTU	Kent Tsang King-chung	8,646	33.15	
NPP	Hung Wing-yip	5,492	21.06	
Nonpartisan	Gi Gi Lee Nga-chee	1,733	6.64	
Total valid votes		28,888		
Turnout				
Registered electors		91,378		
DAB win (new seat)				
FTU win (new seat)				

=== Tai Po ===
Tai Po South
Party	Candidate	Votes	%	±%
BPA	Lo Hiu-fung	11,608	43.07	
DAB	Wong Pik-kiu	8,491	31.51	
Independent	Lucas Cheung Yuk-man	5,731	21.27	
Nonpartisan	Siu Chun-lun	624	2.32	
Nonpartisan	Jonathan Fong	495	1.84	
Total valid votes		26,949		
Turnout				
Registered electors		94,637		
BPA win (new seat)				
DAB win (new seat)				

Tai Po North
Party	Candidate	Votes	%	±%
DAB	Wu Cheuk-him	7,800	32.71	
Nonpartisan	Lok Siu-luen	4,724	19.81	
FTU	Ng Wei-hang	4,206	17.64	
NPP	Lau Man-kit	4,055	17.00	
Nonpartisan	Yip Wai-yi	2,591	10.86	
Bauhinia	Ng Chun-fai	472	1.98	
Total valid votes		23,848		
Turnout				
Registered electors		96,633		
DAB win (new seat)				
Nonpartisan win (new seat)				

=== Sai Kung ===
Sai Kung and Hang Hau
Party	Candidate	Votes	%	±%
PP	Christine Fong Kwok-shan	12,187	59.11	
DAB	Yau Ho-lun	4,839	23.47	
FTU (Civil Force)	Kam Kai-cheung	2,926	14.19	
Nonpartisan	Ng Yau-kan	665	3.23	
Total valid votes		20,617		
Turnout				
Registered electors		76,894		
PP win (new seat)				
DAB win (new seat)				

Tsueng Kwan O South
Party	Candidate	Votes	%	±%
DAB	Sez Pan-pan	9,040	33.98	
FTU	Wong Yuen-hong	8,790	33.04	
Nonpartisan	Dong Qizhen	4,878	18.34	
PP	Lee Sze-long	3,893	14.63	
Total valid votes		26,601		
Turnout				
Registered electors		107,619		
DAB win (new seat)				
FTU win (new seat)				

Tsueng Kwan O North
Party	Candidate	Votes	%	±%
NPP (Civil Force)	Chan Chi-ho	10,952	37.44	
DAB	Wan Kai-ming	10,826	37.01	
PP	Luk Sau-ching	7,477	25.56	
Total valid votes		29,255		
Turnout				
Registered electors		106,638		
NPP win (new seat)				
DAB win (new seat)				

=== Sha Tin ===
Sha Tin West
Party	Candidate	Votes	%	±%
DAB	Chan Tan-tan	11,724	46.16	
Nonpartisan	Calvin Tang Siu-fung	10,385	40.89	
Independent	Rambo Wong Jim-wing	1,750	6.89	
Nonpartisan	Wong Cheuk-him	1,538	6.06	
Total valid votes		25,397		
Turnout				
Registered electors		107,835		
DAB win (new seat)				
Nonpartisan win (new seat)				

Sha Tin East
Party	Candidate	Votes	%	±%
NPP (Civil Force)	Yiu Ka-chun	12,766	45.59	
DAB	Chu Wun-chiu	11,128	39.74	
BPA	Chau Ping-him	4,105	14.66	
Total valid votes		27,999		
Turnout				
Registered electors		109,799		
NPP win (new seat)				
DAB win (new seat)				

Sha Tin South
Party	Candidate	Votes	%	±%
NPP (Civil Force)	Lam Yu-sing	11,720	40.52	
FTU	Ku Wai-ping	7,488	25.89	
DAB	Chuk Hing-toi	5,548	19.18	
Nonpartisan	Choi Wai-ho	4,170	14.42	
Total valid votes		28,926		
Turnout				
Registered electors		104,983		
NPP win (new seat)				
FTU win (new seat)				

Sha Tin North
Party	Candidate	Votes	%	±%
DAB	Choi Wai-shing	10,453	36.21	
NPP (Civil Force)	Law Yi-lam	9,720	33.67	
FTU	Fang Hao-liang	8,692	30.11	
Total valid votes		28,865		
Turnout				
Registered electors		116,216		
DAB win (new seat)				
NPP win (new seat)				

=== Kwai Tsing ===
Tsing Yi
Party	Candidate	Votes	%	±%
DAB	Lo Yuen-ting	22,775	63.52	
FTU	Pang Yap-ming	7,591	21.17	
Nonpartisan	Li Wong-dong	3,205	8.94	
BPA	Man Tsz-yan	2,285	6.37	
Total valid votes		35,856		
Turnout				
Registered electors		121,789		
DAB win (new seat)				
FTU win (new seat)				

Kwai Chung East
Party	Candidate	Votes	%	±%
DAB	Kwok Fu-yung	16,819	63.59	
FTU	Chau Kit-ying	6,975	26.37	
Nonpartisan	Eva Yu Ching-tong	2,656	10.04	
Total valid votes		26,450		
Turnout				
Registered electors		96,054		
DAB win (new seat)				
FTU win (new seat)				

Kwai Chung West
Party	Candidate	Votes	%	±%
FTU	Chan On-ni	12,573	46.90	
DAB	Wong Chun-yeung	10,147	37.85	
Nonpartisan	Zhu Jiang	4,087	15.25	
Total valid votes		26,807		
Turnout				
Registered electors		97,109		
FTU win (new seat)				
DAB win (new seat)				

=== Islands ===
Islands
Party	Candidate	Votes	%	±%
DAB	Yip Pui-kei	11,604	47.47	
FTU	Lau Chin-pang	7,497	30.67	
Nonpartisan	Chung Mei-wai	3,224	13.19	
PoD	Ip Chun-sang	2,118	8.67	
Total valid votes		24,443		
Turnout				
Registered electors		97,109		
win (new seat)				
win (new seat)				

== District Committees ==
=== Central and Western ===
Elected				Defeated			
Candidate	Party	Votes	%	Candidate	Party	Votes	%
Yeung Hok-ming	DAB	120	97.56	Dason Chung Yiu-fai	FTU	66	53.66
Yeung Hoi-wing	DAB	117	95.12	Woo Wai-hung	Nonpartisan	54	43.90
Lam Kam-fai	Nonpartisan	116	94.31				
Cheung Ka-yan	DAB	113	91.87				
Felix Wu Man-hin	Nonpartisan	105	85.36				
Zhang Zong	Nonpartisan	104	84.55				
Chiu Wah-kuen	Nonpartisan	95	77.23				
Sidney Lee Chi-hang	Nonpartisan	94	76.42				

- Total valid votes: 123
- Turnout: 124 of 127 (97.64%)

=== Wan Chai ===
Elected				Defeated			
Candidate	Party	Votes	%	Candidate	Party	Votes	%
Ruby Mok	Independent	102	94.44	Jacqueline Chung Ka-man	Nonpartisan	54	50
Joey Lee Man-lung	Nonpartisan	98	90.74				
Sam Ng Chak-sum	Nonpartisan	91	84.26				
Wind Lam Wai-man	Liberal	87	80.56				

- Total valid votes: 108
- Turnout: 108 of 110 (98.18%)

=== Eastern ===
Elected				Defeated			
Candidate	Party	Votes	%	Candidate	Party	Votes	%
Hung Chi-kit	DAB	146	93.59	Ricky Wong Sze-chin	BPA	94	60.26
Lai Nuen-san	Nonpartisan	145	92.95	Lau Kin	DAB	87	55.77
Kwok Wing-kin	DAB	145	92.95	Lam Ka-leung	FTU	74	47.44
Lam Wing-shing	DAB	144	92.31				
Chan Hoi-wing	DAB	142	91.03				
Wong Chi-chung	DAB	139	89.10				
Tsang Cheuk-yi	Liberal	138	88.46				
Lau Suk-yin	DAB	132	84.62				
Lam Wing-cheung	Nonpartisan	131	83.97				
Lin Cai-ying	Nonpartisan	129	82.69				
Hung Chiu-kwan	Nonpartisan	121	92.95				
Dana Lau Sing-she	NPP	105	67.31				

- Total valid votes: 156
- Turnout: 156 of 161 (96.89%)

=== Southern ===
Elected				Defeated			
Candidate	Party	Votes	%	Candidate	Party	Votes	%
Wong Choi-lap	DAB	119	96.75	Yuen Chi-kwong	FTU	56	45.53
Siu Wai-chung	DAB	117	95.12	Li Siu-ling	FTU	39	31.71
Lai Ka-chi	BPA	117	95.12				
Victor Lau Ngai	DAB	116	94.31				
Howard Chao	BPA	109	88.62				
Nicole Wong Yu-ching	NPP	106	86.18				
Cheung Chin-chung	Nonpartisan	105	85.37				
Lam Wing-yee	Independent	100	81.30				

- Total valid votes: 123
- Turnout: 125 of 128 (97.66%)

=== Yau Tsim Mong ===
Elected				Defeated			
Candidate	Party	Votes	%	Candidate	Party	Votes	%
Benjamin Choi Siu-fung	DAB	167	95.98	Wong Tsz-shing	Nonpartisan	73	41.95
Lau Pak-kei	DAB	165	94.83	Ho Cheuk-fung	Nonpartisan	60	34.48
Jo Chun-wah	DAB	153	87.93	Leung Yui	Nonpartisan	56	32.18
Wong Kin-san	BPA	150	86.21				
Suen Chi-man	FTU	145	83.33				
Alex Poon King-wo	DAB	142	81.61				
Michelle Tang Ming-sum	Nonpartisan	142	81.61				
Luk Tsz-fung	Nonpartisan	139	79.89				

- Total valid votes: 174
- Turnout: 175 of 180 (97.22%)

=== Sham Shui Po ===
Elected				Defeated			
Candidate	Party	Votes	%	Candidate	Party	Votes	%
Cheng Tak-wai	DAB	100	90.91	Chan Kin-yip	Liberal	65	59.09
Leung Ping-kin	Nonpartisan	93	84.55	Gary Chau Chun-fai	KWND	55	50.00
Pong Chiu-fai	BPA	93	84.55	Hou Wenting	FTU	43	39.09
Chen Lihong	FLU	92	83.64				
Chan Lung-kit	DAB	92	83.64				
Wu Wanqiu	DAB	91	82.73				
Hanson Wong Chun-hung	Nonpartisan	83	75.45				
Chum Pik-wa	Nonpartisan	73	66.36				

- Total valid votes: 110
- Turnout: 110 of 117 (94.02%)

=== Kowloon City ===
Elected				Defeated			
Candidate	Party	Votes	%	Candidate	Party	Votes	%
Cheung King-fan	Nonpartisan	163	94.22	Siu Tin-hung	DAB	102	58.96
Leung Yuen-ting	BPA	161	93.06	Cheng Hiu-ling	Nonpartisan	82	47.40
Wong Chi	Nonpartisan	153	88.44				
Ng Fan-kam	DAB	152	87.86				
Fung Mo-kwan	Nonpartisan	151	87.28				
Lau Yuen-yin	Nonpartisan	150	86.71				
Chan Chi-wah	DAB	141	81.50				
Ting Kin-wa	Nonpartisan	129	74.57				

- Total valid votes: 173
- Turnout: 175 of 180 (97.22%)

=== Wong Tai Sin ===
Elected				Defeated			
Candidate	Party	Votes	%	Candidate	Party	Votes	%
Yuen Kwok-keung	DAB	133	95.00	Lee Kin-chung	Nonpartisan	67	47.86
Wendy Lui Kai-lin	Nonpartisan	132	94.29	Wong Kwok-yan	DAB	66	47.14
Joe Lai Wing-ho	DAB	129	92.14				
Leonard Chan Ying	Nonpartisan	125	89.29				
Mok Kin-wing	FTU	120	85.71				
Andie Chan Wai-kwan	Nonpartisan	118	84.29				
Fung Kin-lok	Nonpartisan	117	83.57				
Lee Tung-kong	Nonpartisan	113	80.71				

- Total valid votes: 140
- Turnout: 140 of 146 (95.89%)

=== Kwun Tong ===
Elected				Defeated			
Candidate	Party	Votes	%	Candidate	Party	Votes	%
Au Yeung Kwan-nok	DAB	176	95.65	Chan Chun-kit	DAB	124	67.39
Cheng Keung-fung	FPHE	175	95.11	Peng Junfa	FTU	102	55.43
Cheung Yiu-pan	DAB	174	94.57	Leslie Chin Kwan-ming	Nonpartisan	75	40.76
Tsang Wing-fai	DAB	174	94.57	Cheung Chuen-ki	Nonpartisan	44	23.91
Wong Kai-san	FTU	171	92.93				
Lam Fung	Nonpartisan	171	92.93				
Kam Kin	Nonpartisan	167	90.76				
Sophia Lee Shuk-woon	Nonpartisan	166	90.22				
Ching Hoi-yan	FTU	163	88.59				
Feng Yunsi	DAB	162	88.04				
Kwan Kin-wing	Nonpartisan	159	86.41				
Yu Ka-ming	Independent	155	84.24				
Tang Wing-chun	Nonpartisan	149	80.98				
Ng Ting-fung	Nonpartisan	147	79.89				
Fong Yat-kwan	Nonpartisan	146	79.35				
Boe Zhan Baoyu	Nonpartisan	144	78.26				

- Total valid votes: 184
- Turnout: 185 of 191 (96.86%)

=== Tsuen Wan ===
Elected				Defeated			
Candidate	Party	Votes	%	Candidate	Party	Votes	%
Cheng Chit-pun	Nonpartisan	121	94.53	Hung Yun-sang	FTU	71	55.47
Chow Sum-ming	DAB	121	94.53	Wong Kin-man	Nonpartisan	59	46.09
Lam Yuen-pun	Nonpartisan	120	93.75				
Tsang Tai	DAB	118	92.19				
Chan Chun-chung	DAB	116	90.63				
Lau Chung-kong	DAB	110	85.94				
Chu Tak-wing	Nonpartisan	99	77.34				
Mok Yuen-kwan	Nonpartisan	89	69.53				

- Total valid votes: 128
- Turnout: 128 of 136 (94.12%)

=== Tuen Mun ===
Elected				Defeated			
Candidate	Party	Votes	%	Candidate	Party	Votes	%
Tsoi Shing-hin	DAB	152	98.06	Law Man-ha	FTU	80	51.61
Tsang Hin-hong	DAB	151	97.42	Tsui Siu-lung	Independent	71	45.81
Ip Chun-yuen	DAB	151	97.42	Leung Lap-yan	Nonpartisan	70	45.16
Chui King-hang	Nonpartisan	149	96.13				
Lam Tik-fai	Nonpartisan	143	92.26				
Manwell Chan	FTU	141	90.97				
Kwong Man-tik	NPP	141	90.97				
Kam Man-fung	NPP	140	90.32				
Chan Tsim-heng	DAB	140	90.32				
Li Chiu-hung	Nonpartisan	126	81.29				
Ching Chi-hung	DAB	115	74.19				
Tse Yuk-ling	Nonpartisan	90	58.06				

- Total valid votes: 155
- Turnout: 155 of 161 (96.27%)

=== Yuen Long ===
Elected				Defeated			
Candidate	Party	Votes	%	Candidate	Party	Votes	%
Sze To Chun-hin	DAB	118	93.65	Tam Kam-lin	FLU	88	69.84
Wong Siu-chung	Nonpartisan	116	92.06	August Tam Wai-lam	DAB	87	69.05
Yuen Man-yee	Nonpartisan	116	92.06	Leung Chi-ho	FTU	78	61.90
Lam Wai-ming	Nonpartisan	113	89.68	Danny Chau Chun-tat	Nonpartisan	75	59.52
Lau Kwai-yung	FTU	112	88.89				
Ma Shuk-yin	DAB	112	88.89				
Ho Hiu-man	Nonpartisan	110	87.30				
Tsui Wai-ngoi	Nonpartisan	108	85.71				
Leung Yip-pang	DAB	105	83.33				
Tong Tak-chun	DAB	102	80.95				
Leo Lam Wai-ming	DAB	102	80.95				
Ronnie Tang Yung-yiu	Nonpartisan	99	78.57				
Man Yick-yeung	Nonpartisan	97	76.98				
Wong Yuen-tai	Nonpartisan	95	75.40				
Lam Chung-yin	Nonpartisan	94	74.60				
Li Ching-yee	Nonpartisan	89	70.63				

- Total valid votes: 126
- Turnout: 126 of 128 (98.44%)

=== North ===
Elected				Defeated			
Candidate	Party	Votes	%	Candidate	Party	Votes	%
Pun Hau-man	DAB	100	98.04	Larm Wai-leung	FPHE	59	57.84
Wu King-pang	DAB	98	91.18	Wu Yingpeng	Nonpartisan	53	51.96
Hau Hon-shek	DAB	93	91.18				
Ng Yiu-cho	DAB	92	90.20				
Tsang Hing-lung	DAB	92	90.20				
Warwick Wan Wo-tat	Nonpartisan	89	87.25				
Lau Chun-hoi	DAB	79	77.45				
Windy Or Sin-yi	DAB	61	59.80				

- Total valid votes: 102
- Turnout: 102 of 102 (100.00%)

=== Tai Po ===
Elected				Defeated			
Candidate	Party	Votes	%	Candidate	Party	Votes	%
Mui Siu-fung	DAB	79	90.80	Lo Chi-ping	DAB	48	55.17
Rex Li Wah-kwong	BPA	74	85.06	Yip Chun-kit	DAB	44	50.57
Yu Chi-wing	Nonpartisan	73	83.91	Leung Ho-Lim	FTU	38	43.68
Chan Siu-kuen	Nonpartisan	73	83.91	Hammer Lam Hoi-kwan	Nonpartisan	24	24.14
Wong Wai-tung	DAB	71	81.61				
Gary Mak Shing-ho	Nonpartisan	62	71.26				
Kitty Chan Kin-kwan	NPP	59	67.82				
Lee Man-kit	DAB	54	62.07				

- Total valid votes: 87
- Turnout: 87 of 89 (97.75%)

=== Sai Kung ===
Elected				Defeated			
Candidate	Party	Votes	%	Candidate	Party	Votes	%
Philip Li Ka-leung	DAB	104	97.20	Wanny Lau Lai-shim	DAB	61	57.01
Ken Chan Kin-chun	NPP/CF	103	96.26	Chan Sung-man	DAB	59	55.14
Tam Chuk-kwan	NPP/CF	101	94.39	Joe Ho Chi-chiu	TKODFG	43	40.19
Cheng Yu-hei	FTU	100	93.46				
Chau Ka-lok	DAB	100	76.64				
Cheung Chin-pang	Nonpartisan	98	91.59				
Chris Cheng Mei-hung	Nonpartisan	94	87.85				
Kan Tung-tung	DAB	87	81.31				
Tsang Kwok-ka	Nonpartisan	86	80.37				
Chan Kwong-fai	TKODFG	83	77.57				
Chan Kai-wai	Nonpartisan	83	77.57				
Li Tin-chi	Nonpartisan	82	76.64				

- Total valid votes: 107
- Turnout: 108 of 111 (97.30%)

=== Sha Tin ===
Elected				Defeated			
Candidate	Party	Votes	%	Candidate	Party	Votes	%
Kung Mei-chi	DAB	186	95.88	Leung Ho-kai	NPP/CF	128	65.98
Ha Kim-kwan	NPP/CF	185	95.36	Ho Wai-chun	FTU	124	63.92
Ng Kai-tai	DAB	184	94.85	Yeung Chung	Independent	108	55.67
Lam Yuk-wa	Nonpartisan	184	94.85	Lam Chun-lai	Nonpartisan	71	36.60
Guo Xuantong	Nonpartisan	183	94.33				
Law Yuen-pui	Nonpartisan	181	93.30				
Cheung Pak-yuen	NPP/CF	180	92.78				
Chan Hiu-ying	Nonpartisan	176	90.72				
Janet Lee Ching-yee	FTU	175	90.21				
Ada Lo Tai-suen	Nonpartisan	170	87.63				
Mok Hei-man	DAB	169	87.11				
Leung Ka-wai	NPP/CF	149	76.80				
Lam Siu-man	Nonpartisan	147	75.77				
Lau Tak-wing	Independent	139	71.65				
Maverick Leung Chun-pong	Nonpartisan	129	66.49				
Ronald Yeung Ying-hon	DAB	136	70.10				

- Total valid votes: 194
- Turnout: 194 of 199 (97.49%)

=== Kwai Tsing ===
Elected				Defeated			
Candidate	Party	Votes	%	Candidate	Party	Votes	%
Wong Shuk-man	DAB	132	93.62	Wong Yiu-chung	BPA	72	51.06
Tang Lai-ling	DAB	130	92.20	Wong Pui-yin	Nonpartisan	67	47.52
Lam Ying-wai	DAB	125	88.65	Tsui Kam-chuen	Nonpartisan	63	44.68
Yuen Yun-hung	DAB	123	87.23	Philip Tam Sai-wah	Nonpartisan	52	36.88
Ng King-wah	DAB	122	86.52	Li Wai-ming	Nonpartisan	39	27.66
Ng Chi-wah	DAB	114	80.85	Wilfred Lam Kwok-hing	Nonpartisan	39	27.66
Mok Yee-ki	BPA	113	80.14				
Lee Wai-lok	FTU	112	79.43				
Guo Huimin	Nonpartisan	112	79.43				
Benny Ng Yam-fung	DAB	103	73.05				
Wong Siu-kwan	DAB	92	65.25				
James Lau Hing-wah	Nonpartisan (BPA)	82	58.16				

- Total valid votes: 141
- Turnout: 141 of 149 (94.63%)

=== Islands ===
Elected				Defeated			
Candidate	Party	Votes	%	Candidate	Party	Votes	%
Lau Shun-ting	DAB	98	85.22	Tsang Chiu-yuk	NPP	65	56.52
Mealoha Kwok Wai-man	DAB	97	84.35	Li Wing-foo	FTU	31	26.96
Luo Chenghuan	Nonpartisan	92	80.00				
Jonathan Chow Yuen-kuk	Nonpartisan	77	66.96				

- Total valid votes: 115
- Turnout: 115 of 117 (98.29%)

== See also ==
- 2023 Hong Kong local elections
