= A4 Alliance =

Political alliance in Hong Kong

A4 Alliance A4聯盟
- Founder: Scott Leung; Kitson Yang; Connie Lam; Gary Zhang
- Founded: 15 June 2022
- Regional affiliation: Pro-Beijing camp

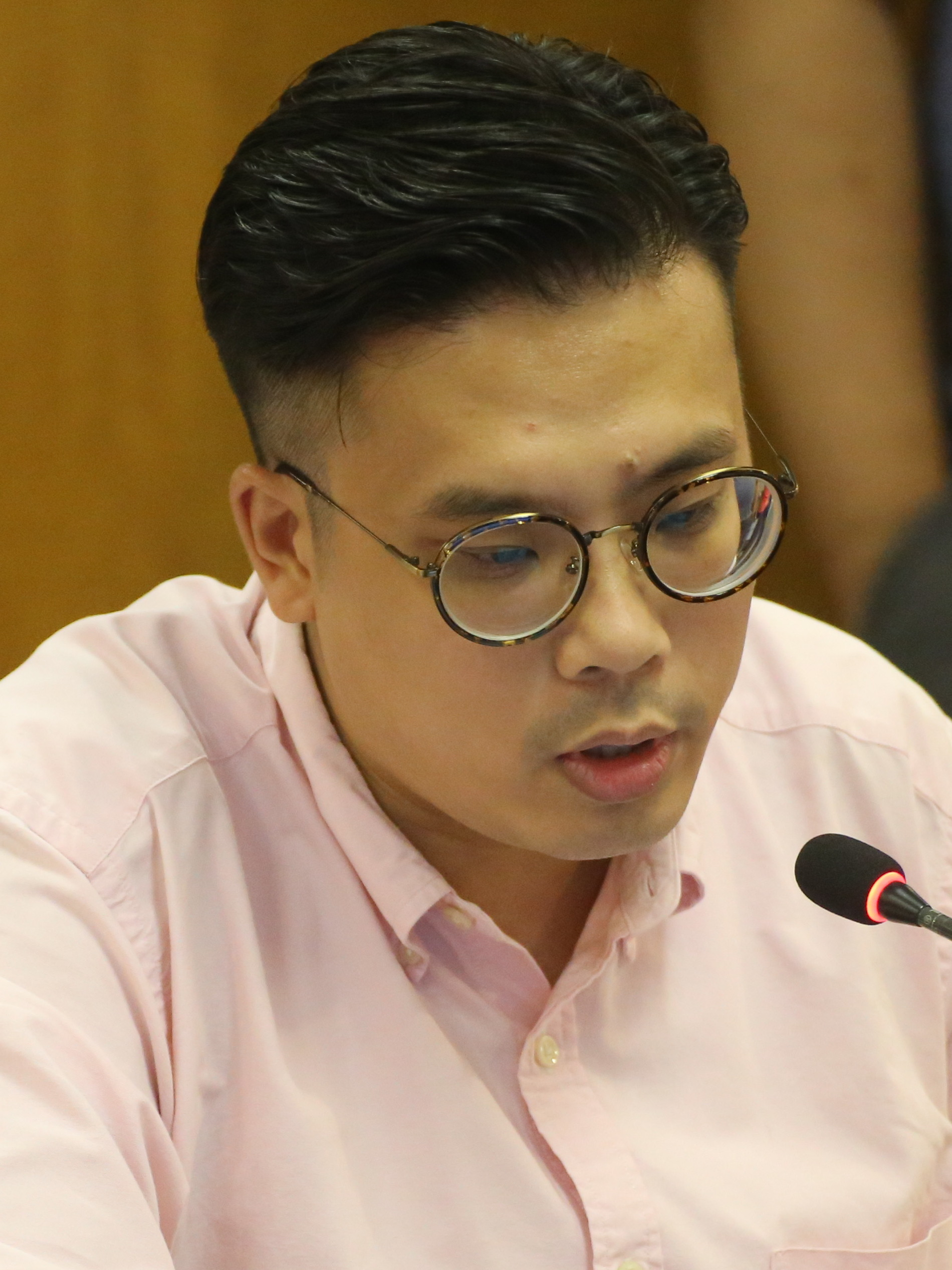
Scott Leung

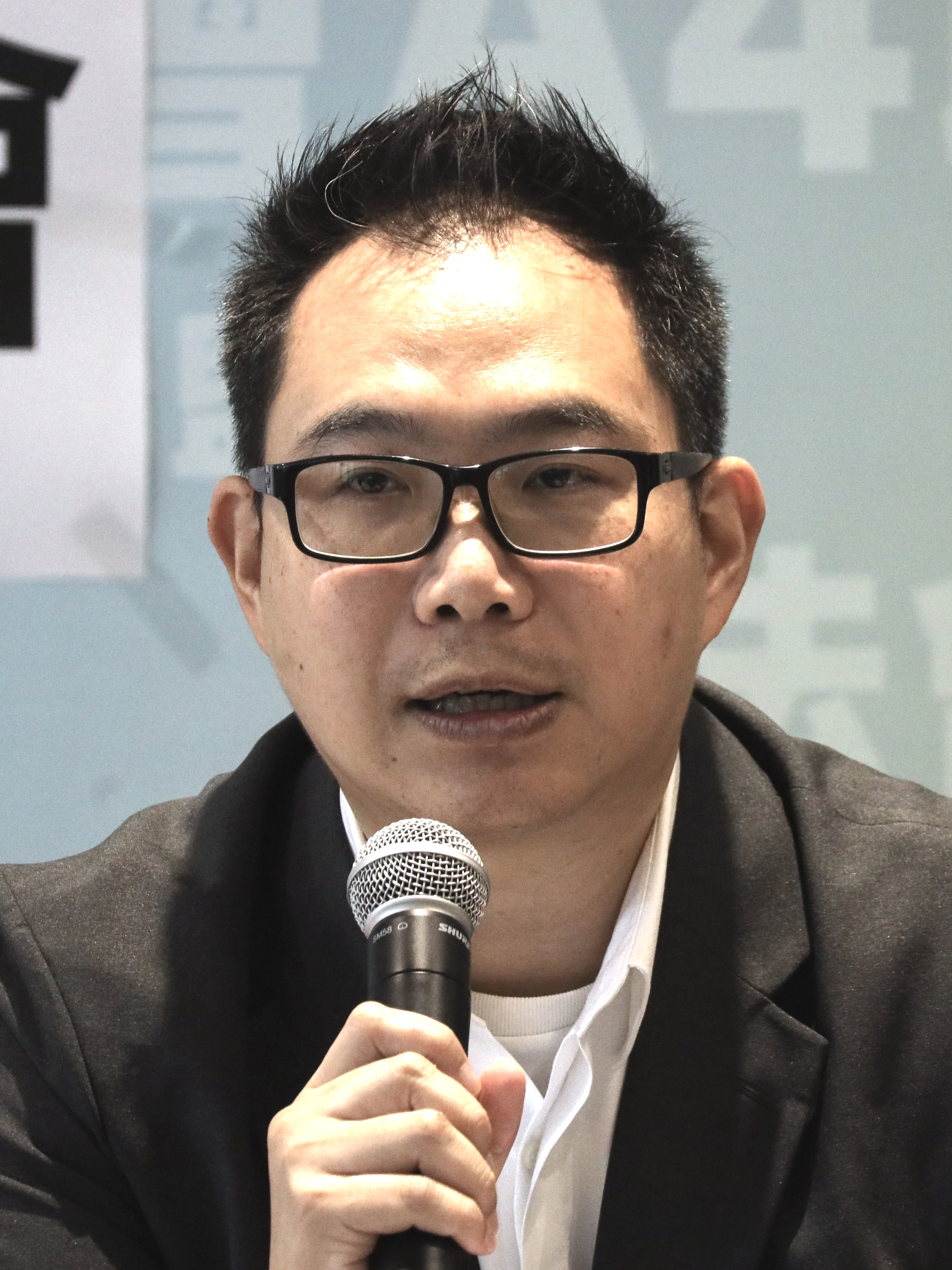
Kitson Yang

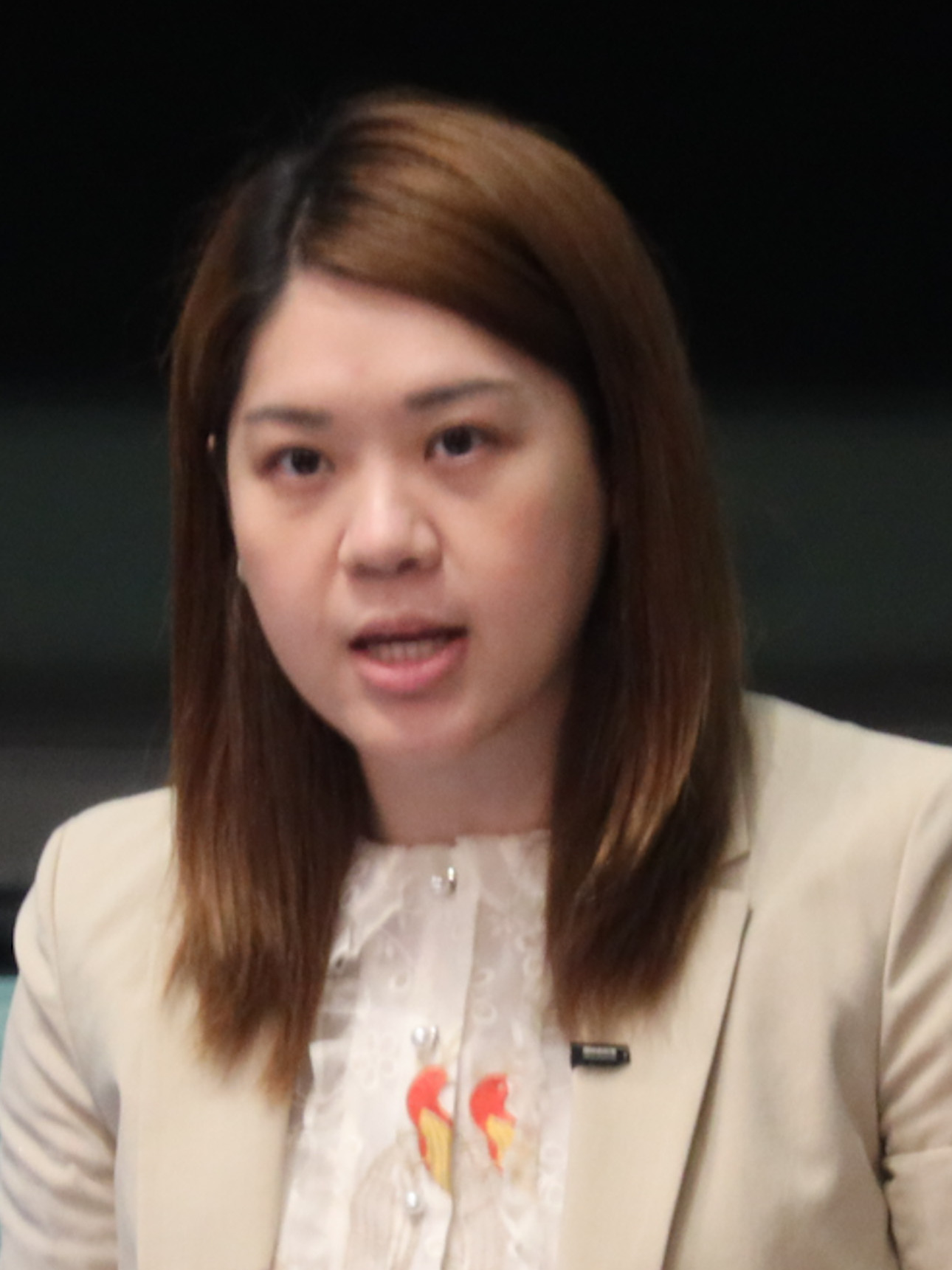
Connie Lam

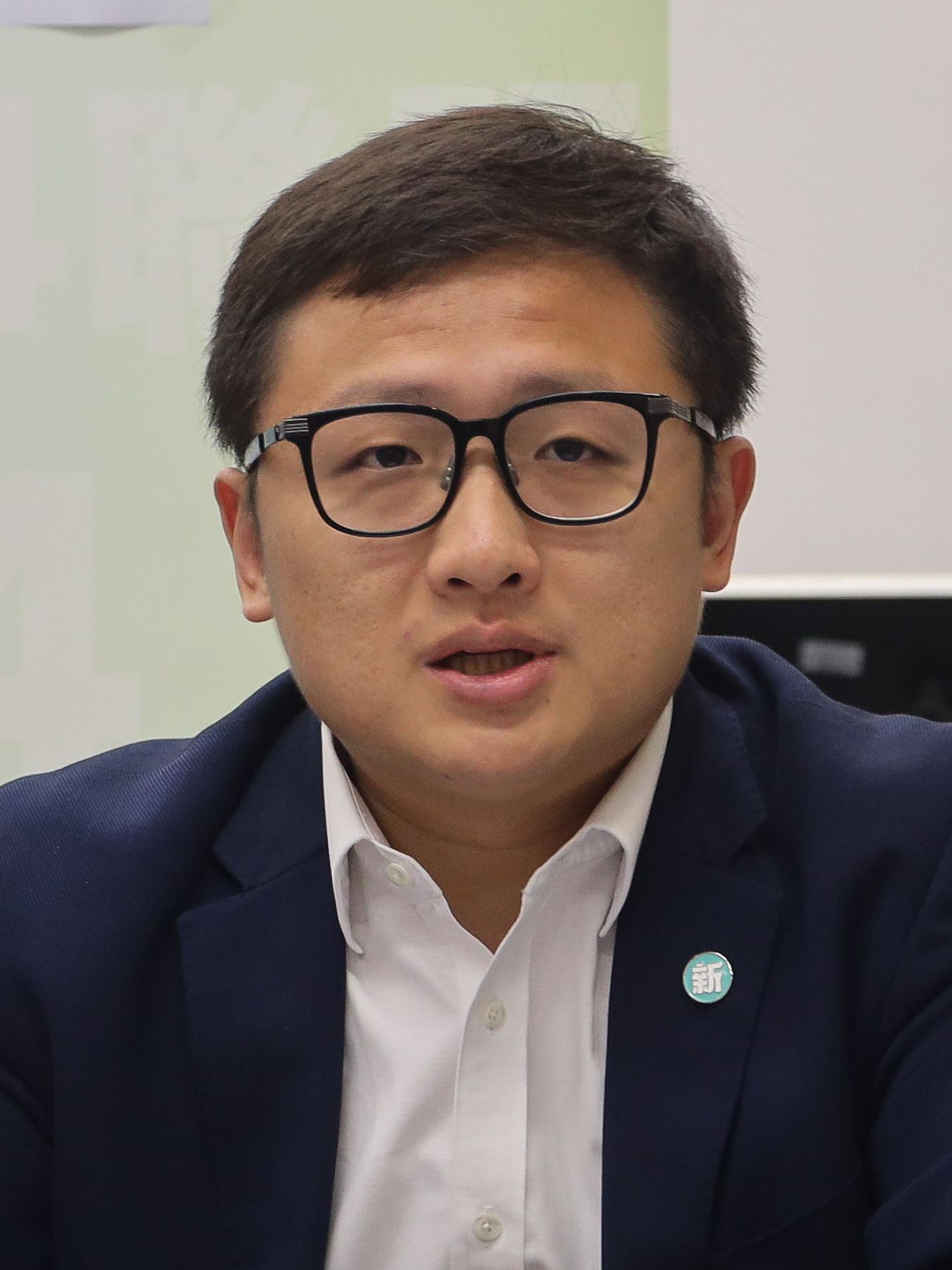
Gary Zhang

The A4 Alliance (Chinese: A4聯盟) is a political alliance of four independent lawmakers in the Legislative Council of Hong Kong.

The A4 Alliance (A4 means "Alliance of Four") was founded by four directly elected pro-Beijing politicians: Scott Leung (MP for Kowloon West), Kitson Yang (Kowloon Central), Connie Lam (New Territories South East), and Gary Zhang (New Territories North) on 15 June 2022, a year and a half after their inauguration. The four said they work not as a political party but as a parliamentary group, aiming to increase co-operation in the legislature.

Each member will focus on the respective policies, with Leung on housing, Yang on medical, Lam on social care, and Zhang on transport. Gatherings were regularly organised to discuss weekly issues and agenda of Legislative Council meetings, while MPs can speak on behalf of the other A4 members in the chamber if consensus is reached.

Since its formation, the A4 Alliance has expressed opinion on various Hong Kong local issues and published proposals, while supporting the government on political debates.

== See also ==
- Professional Forum, a similar loose political group formed in 2008
