= 2023 Hong Kong local elections =

- 10 December 2023

264 (of the 470) seats in all Districts Councils
- Registered: 4,329,710 (GC) ▲4.76%
- Turnout: 1,195,331 (27.59%) ▼43.64pp
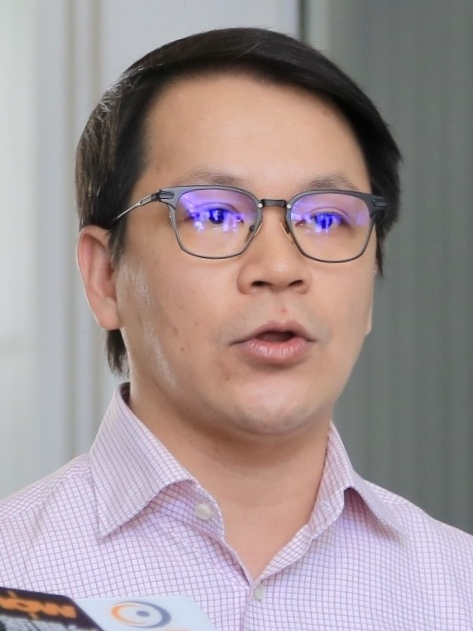

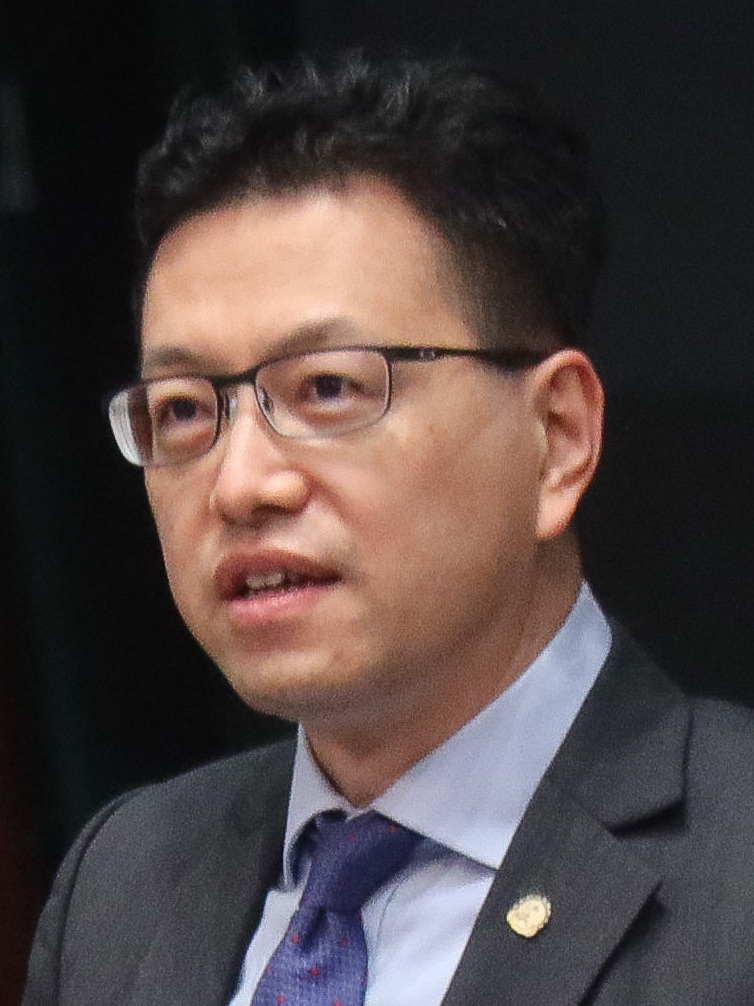

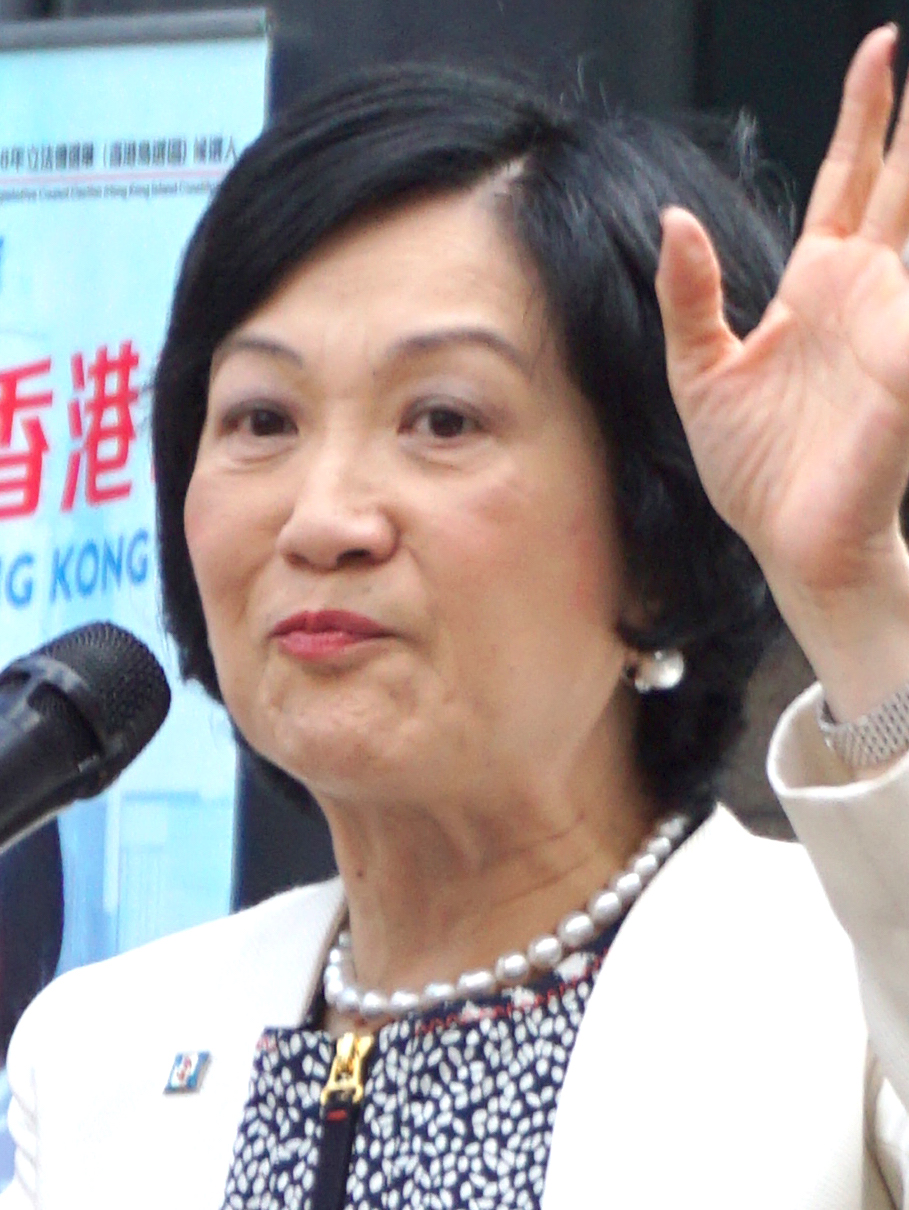

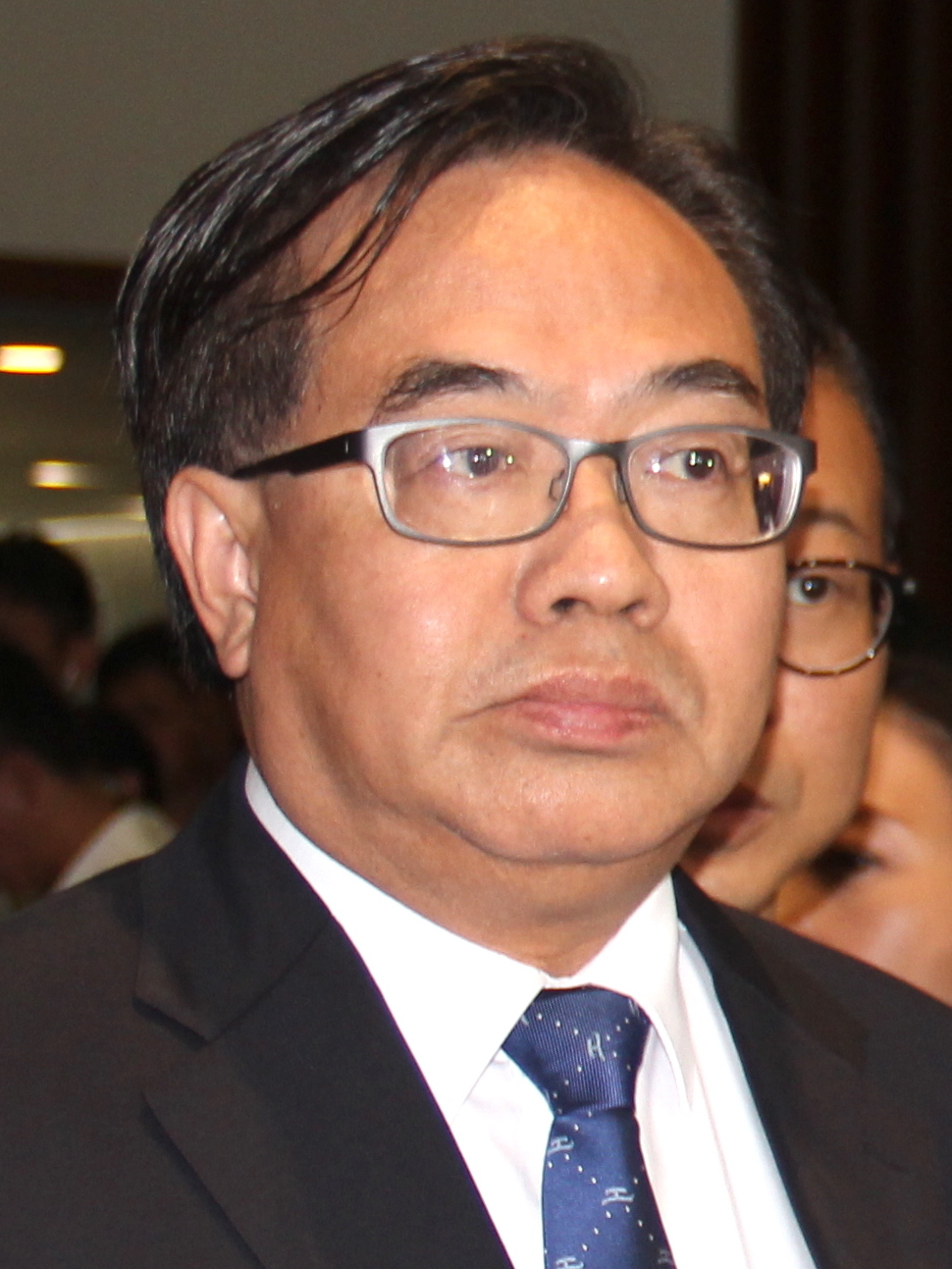

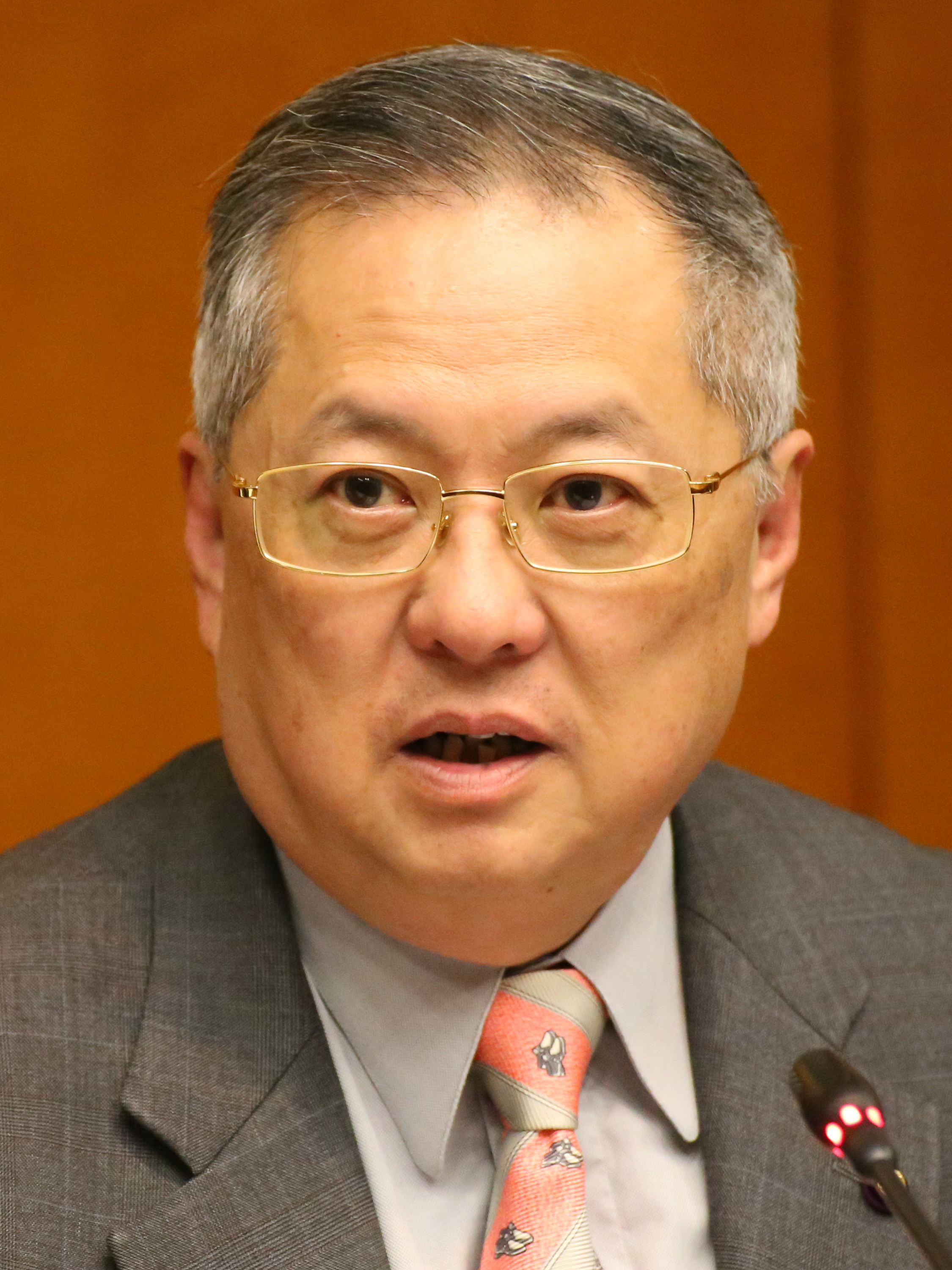

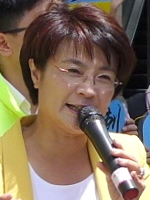

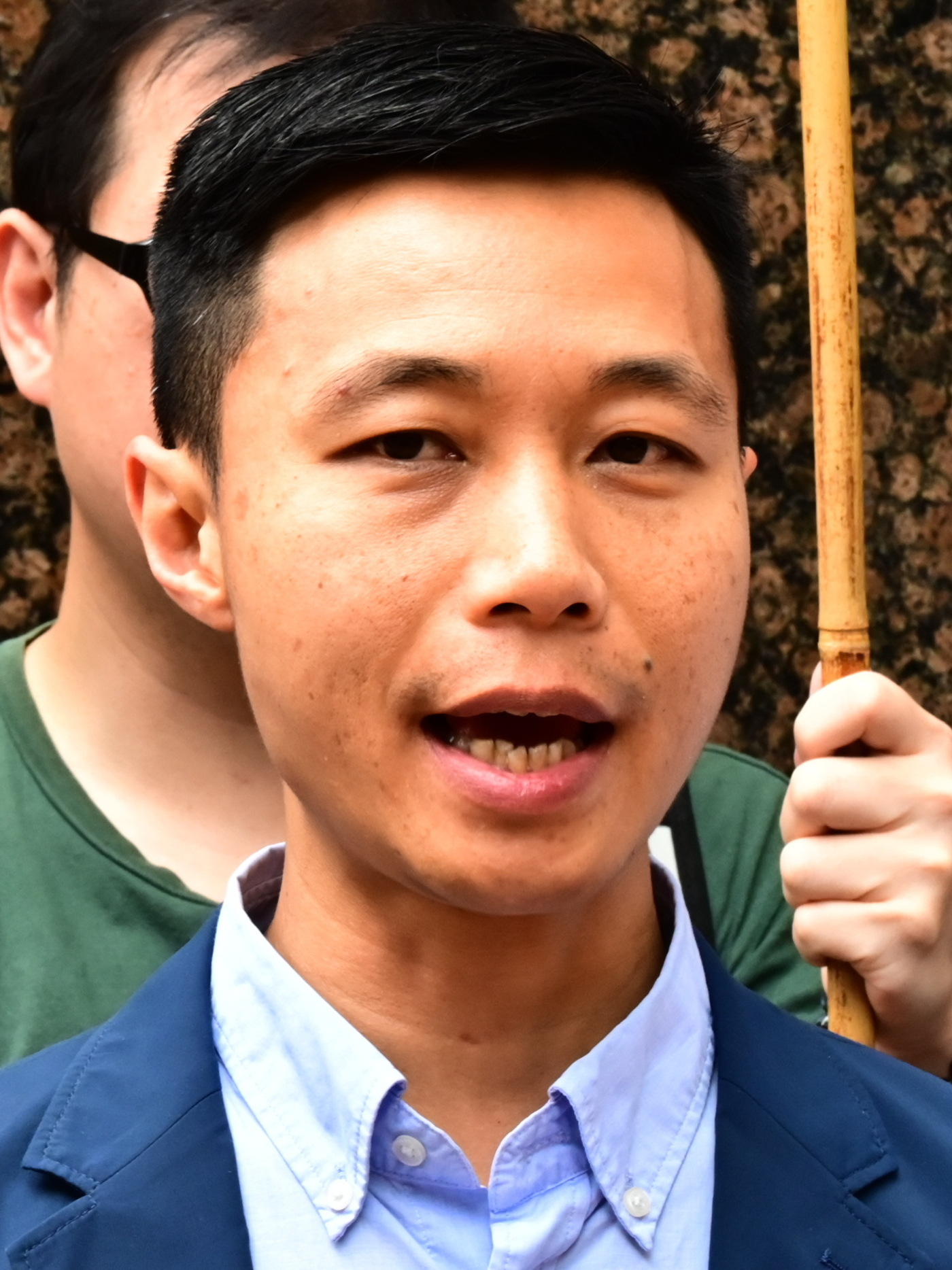
	First party	Second party	Third party
Leader	Gary Chan	Ng Chau-pei	Regina Ip
Party	DAB	FTU	NPP/CF
Alliance	Pro-Beijing	Pro-Beijing	Pro-Beijing
Last election	21 seats, 16.78%	5 seats, 4.39%	0 seat, 2.97%
Seats won	109	27	15
Seat change	▲88	▲22	▲14
Popular vote	486,942	206,285	99,775
Percentage	41.58%	17.61%	8.52%
Swing	▲24.80pp	▲13.22pp	▲5.55pp
	Fourth party	Fifth party	Sixth party
Leader	Lo Wai-kwok	Tommy Cheung	Wong Kwan
Party	BPA	Liberal	FPHE
Alliance	Pro-Beijing	Pro-Beijing	Pro-Beijing
Last election	3 seats, 2.27%	5 seats, 0.94%	3 seats, 0.66%
Seats won	12	5	3
Seat change	▲9	0	0
Popular vote	59,015	19,574	17,744
Percentage	5.04%	1.67%	1.52%
Swing	▲2.27pp	▲0.73pp	▲0.86pp
	Seventh party	Eighth party	Ninth party
Leader	Christine Fong	Marco Liu	Lam Chun-sing
Party	PP	New Prospect	FLU
Alliance	Pro-Beijing	Pro-Beijing	Pro-Beijing
Last election	Did not contest (Note: Three members of the Professional Power were elected in 2019 elections but then declared as independent candidates)	New party	0 seat, 0.06%
Seats won	1	1	1
Seat change	▼2	▲1	▲1
Popular vote	23,557	21,380	12,436
Percentage	2.01%	1.83%	1.06%
Swing	N/A	N/A	▲1.00pp
- Map of the winning party (in circles) and vote share of top candidate by constituency

The 2023 Hong Kong District Council elections were held on 10 December 2023 for all 18 District Councils of Hong Kong, electing 264 of the 470 seats in the councils. Under the new electoral system, 88 of the elected 264 seats were directly elected by 4.3 million voters, while 176 of them were indirectly elected among some 2,400 members of the government-appointed District Committees. More than one-third of the remaining seats were appointed by the Chief Executive.

The electoral changes passed earlier in the year revived appointed seats in the deliberation bodies, introduced seats elected by government-appointed District Committees, and tightened eligibility with vetting and mandatory nomination from the District Committee members. As a result, this is the first election in Hong Kong contested by pro-Beijing candidates only, as the pro-democracy camp, which won a landslide in the last election amidst protests, had faced challenges since under the national security law, and under the new electoral rules, both pro-democracy and moderate parties failed to earn enough nominations to enter the race.

Despite the government's efforts to boost the voter turnout, only 1.19 million voters, or 27.5% of registered voters cast their ballots, the lowest ever in the Hong Kong District Council's history and the lowest among all elections since China took control of Hong Kong. The largest pro-Beijing party, the Democratic Alliance for the Betterment and Progress of Hong Kong (DAB) regained its status as the largest party in the district councils, winning 109 seats, while many smaller parties, which lacked strong community networks and resources, failed to win many seats.

== Background ==
=== Suppression of pro-democrats ===
In the previous District Council elections, in 2019, the pro-democracy camp in conjunction with the localist camp achieved its biggest landslide victory in the history of Hong Kong, gaining absolute majority in votes and electoral seats in all of the 18 District Councils and tripling their seats from around 124 to about 388 amid the highly intensified territory-wide anti-government protests. In response, the Beijing government installed the far-reaching Hong Kong national security law and the massive overhaul of the city's Legislative Council electoral system.

In May 2021, the Hong Kong government passed the Public Offices (Candidacy and Taking Up Offices) (Miscellaneous Amendments) Ordinance 2021 to imposes oath-taking requirements on District Council members. Six months before the bill passage, dozens of opposition District Councillors resigned for refusal to take an oath under the new law.

In early July 2021, the government reportedly considered banning 230 councillors to take oath of office and would ask them return their accrued salaries which worth around a million dollars. Such reports triggered a mass resignation of more than 260 pro-democracy councillors, while eight other had been unseated as they were in custody or had left the city.

Following four oath-taking ceremonies starting in early September, oaths taken by 49 District Councillors were ruled invalid without any explanation. Together with the councillors who resigned, fled and imprisoned, it left a total of more than 70 per cent seats in the 18 District Councils vacant. Under the amended Oaths and Declarations Ordinance, the disqualified District Councillors would be banned from standing in elections for the next five years.

The pro-Beijing camp was able to take back control of several councils, including Kowloon City, Kwun Tong, Wan Chai and North District. The number of the members in some councils also reduced significantly, Wong Tai Sin to just two members, Central and Western District to three members, and Southern District to four, which paralysed some of the functions of these councils. Nevertheless, Chief Executive Carrie Lam in July 2021 announced that no by-elections would be held during her tenure.

=== Election overhaul ===
Changes to the composition of the District Councils: 2019 election (479 seats): Directly elected (452); Ex-officio (Chairmen of Rural Committee) (27); 2023 election (470 seats): Directly elected (88); Ex-officio (Chairmen of Rural Committee) (27); Indirectly elected (Electoral College of District Committees) (176); Appointed (179)

On 2 May 2023, Chief Executive John Lee announced a major revamp of the District Council electoral system to prevent the councils from being "manipulated and paralysed" by those promoting "separatism" and violence, safeguard national security and implement the principle of "patriots running Hong Kong". Under the plan, the number of the elected seats will be significantly reduced to around 20 per cent, while each of the 40 per cent of the seats will be returned by indirect elections and appointed by the Chief Executive.

A total of 88 directly-elected seats in 44 constituencies will be returned by double-seat single-vote system, while 176 indirectly-elected seats will be elected by members of the government-appointed District Committees, or "three committees" (Chinese: 三會), namely the District Fight Crime Committees (DFCCs), the District Fire Safety Committees (DFSCs), the Area Committees (ACs), in the respective district by block vote. All candidates must obtain three nominations from each of the three committees besides more than 50 local voters and confirm their eligibility through an eligibility review committee to decide whether a candidate complies with the legal requirements and conditions of upholding the Basic Law and bearing allegiance to the government.

On 28 September, David Lok Kai-hong, chairman of the Electoral Affairs Commission (EAC), said the opening hours for the District Council elections will run from 8:30 a.m. to 10:30 p.m., an hour less when compared to the previous term in 2019 but the same as that of the Legislative Council election in 2021.

Veteran litigant Kwok Cheuk-kin, who was also a member of the Democratic Party known as the "King of Judicial Review", filed an application for judicial review in November against the nomination system, arguing that some three-quarters of the candidates were also on three committees responsible for deciding who could stand, making it hard for non-committee members to get nominated.

High Court Judge Russell Coleman reportedly said that it was "surprising" that most of the committee members had made nominations from among their own members, but dismissed Kwok's appeal dismissed, ruling that the it was "not sufficient" to conclude that it was only because of an unfairness in the nomination system that the pro-democracy politicians did not secure enough nominations. "What is shown is that members of the 3Cs [three committees] tend to favour themselves or their peers. But that is not necessarily inappropriate when the individual characteristic of members of the 3Cs (part of the reason they were appointed in the first place) is taken into account," Coleman said in the statement.

== Composition ==
Districts	Geographical Constituencies		District Committees Constituencies Seats	Appointed Seats	Ex-officio Seats	Total Seats	±
Districts	Constituencies	Seats	District Committees Constituencies Seats	Appointed Seats	Ex-officio Seats	Total Seats	±
Central and Western	Central, Western	4	8	8	—	20	▲5
Wan Chai	Wan Chai	2	4	4	—	10	▼3
Eastern	Tai Pak, Hong Wan, Chai Wan	6	12	12	—	30	▼5
Southern	Southern District Southeast, Southern District Northwest	4	8	8	—	20	▲3
Yau Tsim Mong	Yau Tsim Mong South, Yau Tsim Mong North	4	8	8	—	20	0
Sham Shui Po	Sham Shui Po West, Sham Shui Po East	4	8	8	—	20	▼5
Kowloon City	Kowloon City North, Kowloon City South	4	8	8	—	20	▼5
Wong Tai Sin	Wong Tai Sin East, Wong Tai Sin West	4	8	8	—	20	▼5
Kwun Tong	Kwun Tong Southeast, Kwun Tong Central, Kwun Tong North, Kwun Tong West	8	16	16	—	40	0
Tsuen Wan	Tsuen Wan Northwest, Tsuen Wan Southeast	4	8	8	2	22	▲1
Tuen Mun	Tuen Mun East, Tuen Mun West, Tuen Mun North	6	12	13	1	32	0
Yuen Long	Yuen Long Town Centre, Yuen Long Rural East, Tin Shui Wai South and Ping Ha, Tin Shui Wai North	8	16	16	6	46	▲1
North	Wu Tip Shan, Robin's Nest	4	8	8	4	24	▲2
Tai Po	Tai Po South, Tai Po North	4	8	8	2	22	▲1
Sai Kung	Sai Kung and Hang Hau, Tseung Kwan O South, Tseung Kwan O North	6	12	12	2	32	▲1
Sha Tin	Sha Tin West, Sha Tin East, Sha Tin South, Sha Tin North	8	16	17	1	42	0
Kwai Tsing	Tsing Yi, Kwai Chung East, Kwai Chung West	6	12	13	1	32	0
Islands	Islands	2	4	4	8	18	0
Total		88	176	179	27	470	▼9

== Contesting parties ==
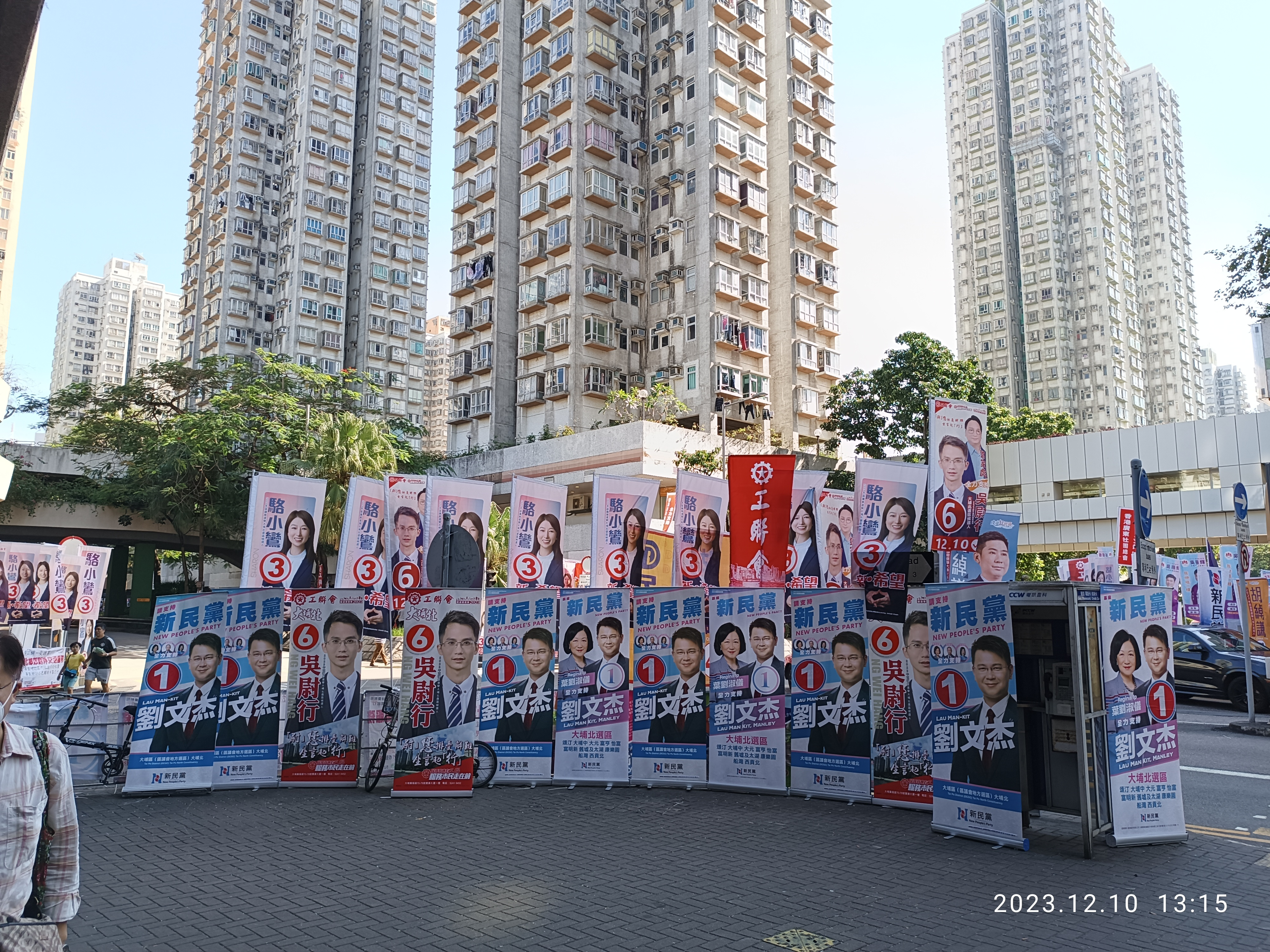
Six candidates fighting for two seats in Tai Po North, including Bauhinia Party's sole member

- Democratic Alliance for the Betterment and Progress of Hong Kong (DAB): The flagship pro-government party announced that it would send 122 candidates to contest all 44 geographical constituencies and the indirectly-elected District Committees constituencies.
- Business and Professionals Alliance for Hong Kong (BPA): The pro-business party announced 20 members are to run in the elections.
- Hong Kong Federation of Trade Unions (FTU): FTU confirmed a total of 46 names would be put forward, 25 of which would run in geographical constituencies.
- New People's Party (NPP) and Civil Force: NPP, together with the regional-based Civil Force, will send 29 candidates to run for the election, including 17 running for geographical constituency direct elections and 12 running for District Committees constituency indirect election.
- Liberal Party: Liberals endorsed four candidates in the elected constituencies, all on the Hong Kong Island, and other three for the indirectly-elected seats.
- Federation of Hong Kong and Kowloon Labour Unions (FLU): FLU will fill two candidates, one in the Sham Shui Po East geographical constituency and one in the indirectly-elected constituency in Yuen Long District.
- Roundtable: Led by former vice-chairman of the New People's Party Michael Tien, the party planned to send five candidates but struggled to gain nomination. Regina Ip, NPP chair, initially pledged to support Roundtable but the party later declined to endorse. Only one of its members had got the number of nominations required to stand in the end.
- Professional Power (PP): Three members from the Sai Kung-based group would run for the district's constituencies.
- New Prospect for Hong Kong (NPHK): The recently founded New Prospect for Hong Kong will fill five candidates in North, Yuen Long, Kowloon City and Wong Tai Sin districts.
- Path of Democracy (PoD): Convenor Ronny Tong said around six to seven of its party members expressed interest in running, but he reassessed that only one or two could be successfully nominated.
- Bauhinia Party: This local poll would be the first for the three-year-old party, expected to field five candidates. But only one of its members eventually ran in the election.

== Nominations ==
The Electoral Affairs Commission received 400 nominations in the nomination period, 228 of which were running for the 176 seats in the District Committee constituencies indirectly elected by some 2,500 members of the "three committees" and 171 for the 88 seats in the 44 geographical constituencies directly elected 4.3 million registered voters. None of the candidates was from the opposition camp, which first joined the local elections in 1985. According to Hong Kong Free Press's calculation, more than 75 per cent of the geographical constituencies candidates were also members of the three committees which were responsible for nominating candidates.

The pro-democracy parties which intended to run had experienced difficulties in seeking nominations from the members of the "three committees", many of which came from the pro-Beijing parties, as the Home Affairs Department refused to disclose personal contact details citing the "privacy of personal data".

The Democratic Party became the first remaining pro-democracy party to announce that they would contest in the election with six candidates, two less than expected. However on 30 October, it announced that none of its candidates had succeeded in getting the nominations from the "three committees" required to run. As a result, the party would be absent in the district council election for the first time since its establishment in 1994.

Hong Kong Association for Democracy and People's Livelihood (ADPL) was second in the pro-democracy camp to declare the intention to join the elections by filling two candidates. Neither of its candidates was able to enter the race.

Third Side, the only non-establishment party in the legislature, abandoned the campaign as three hopefuls could not receive enough nominations.

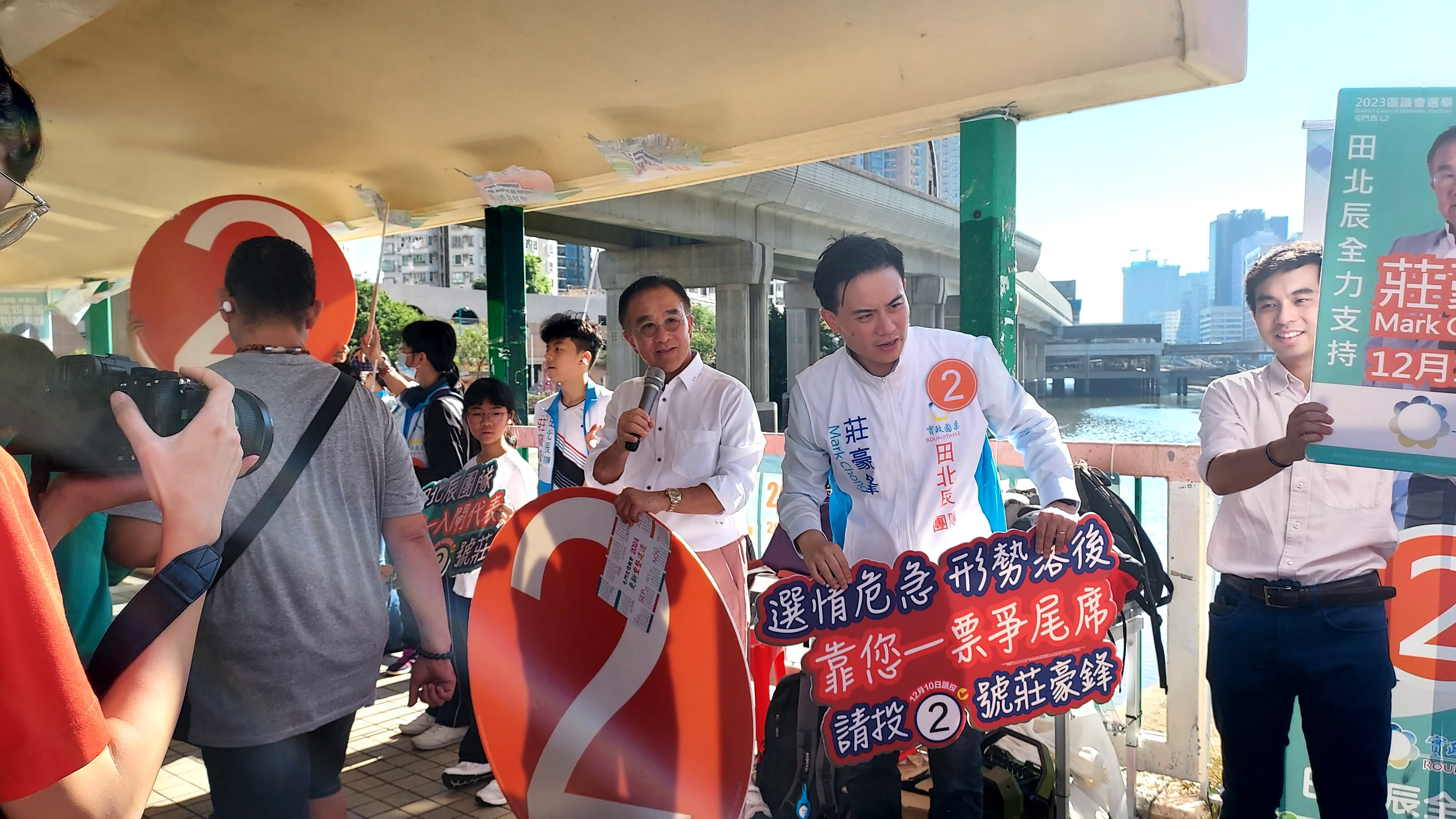
Roundtable chairman Michael Tien and sole candidate Chong Ho-fung on election day

Even pro-Beijing legislator Michael Tien complained about candidates from his party Roundtable being unable to obtain nominations from the "three committees" members. Roundtable had hoped to field five candidates, but only one of its members had got the number of nominations required to stand.

Zheng Yanxiong, director of the Liaison Office of the Central People's Government in Hong Kong, on 30 October said there were "recognised standards" for patriots and “it would be impossible for someone, or some political parties, who were opposing Hong Kong and China, to become patriotic just for chanting certain slogans overnight".

== Turnout campaign ==
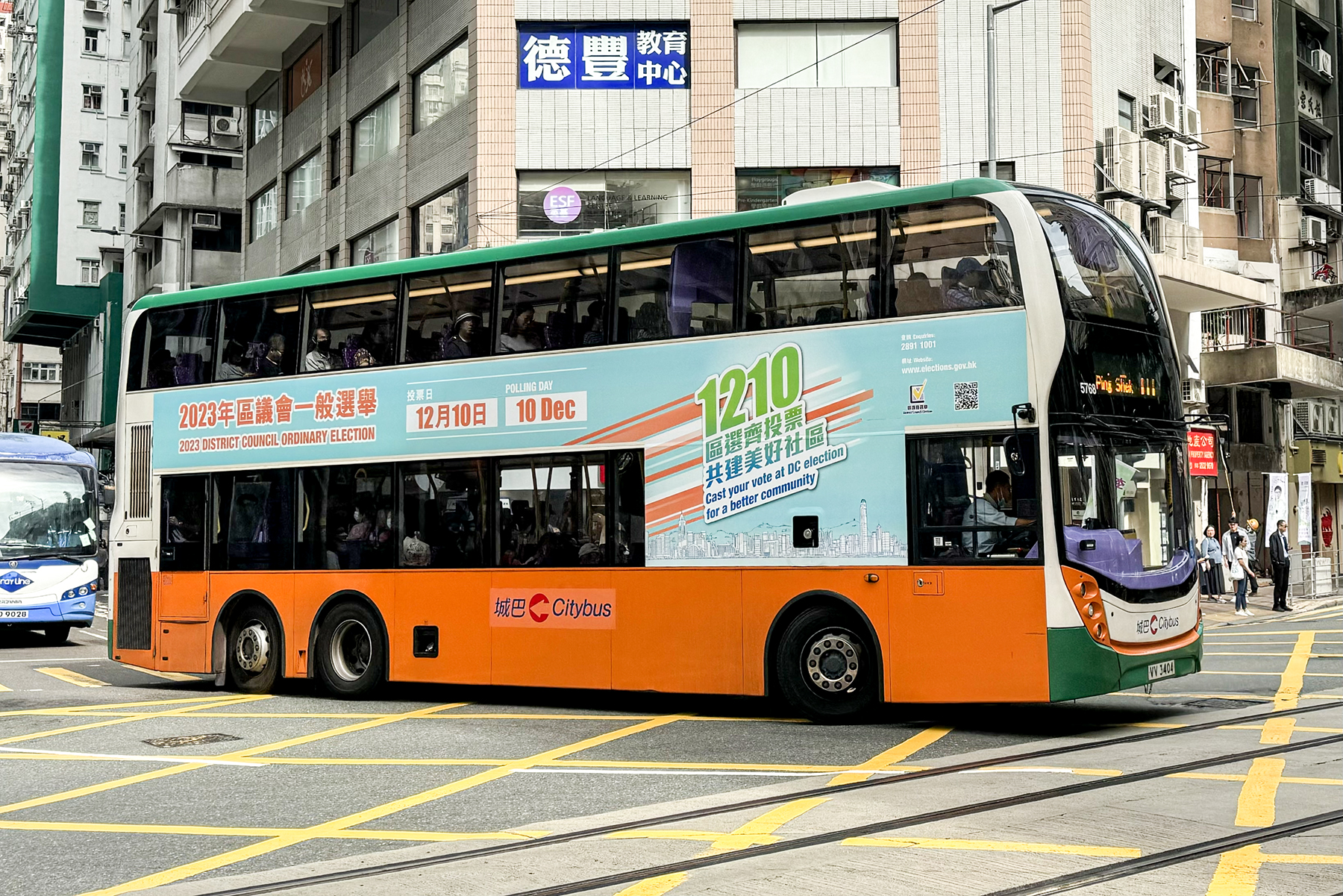
Election posters urging public to vote are seen across the city

Following the record-low turnout of the 2021 legislative election as a consequence of the opposition's boycott, some experts predicted a record-low voter turnout for the 2023 local elections. Officials insisted a high turnout does not equate to a successful election and that such a result would not be blindly pursued; however, they also vowed to promote the local elections "by all means". Dozens of promotional videos were published by the government; posters and leaflets urging the public to vote could also be found across the city.

In November 2023, Chief Secretary for Administration Eric Chan said that Hong Kong's 170,000 civil servants "are duty-bound to vote, and they should lead by example to let the public know about the importance of voting." Pro-Beijing Democratic Alliance for the Betterment and Progress of Hong Kong (DAB) politician Starry Lee refused to predict the voter turnout, but said "I have received only positive feedback from residents" and that it was a "good sign" that election promoting was carried out "in a healthy way."

Chief Executive John Lee also asked for civil servants to boost voter turnout, stating "It is also a civic responsibility to vote, that's why we have asked civil servants to demonstrate that civic responsibility to come out to vote." Lee avoided answering a question on whether low voter turnout would discredit the new voting system, and both Secretary for Home and Youth Affairs Alice Mak and Secretary for Constitutional and Mainland Affairs Erick Tsang said that low voter turnout was not necessarily a failure.

Secretary for the Civil Service Ingrid Yeung also appealed to retired civil servants to vote as "it is their civic responsibility to do so". Amid reports about potential penalties for civil servants who do not cast a ballot, Eric Chan criticised on 3 December unspecified individuals for having "ulterior motives" of spreading false information online.

Leung Chau-ting, the founder and chairman of the Federation of Civil Service Union, expressed concern over the government plan sending out thank-you card for people after casting their vote, noting the pressure felt by the civil servants due to the government and bureaux' overwhelming appeals, as there have never been any repeated calls by the government for civil officials to cast ballots in prior elections. In response, Eric Chan stressed the government would "definitely not" require civil servants to use the card as proof and called on people not to come up with conspiracy theories.

The Hong Kong government on 28 November announced a series of activities, including outdoor music performances, a drone show and a Security Bureau-themed photograph exhibition, on 12 December, a day before the polling day, in an attempt to "further enhance the election atmosphere". As the government designated the day following election as a school holiday after some schools in the past elections were affected due to a delay of vote counting, pro-government members voiced concern that families could leave Hong Kong for vacations and hence hamper the turnout. In response the authorities said activities were under planning to attract students to stay.

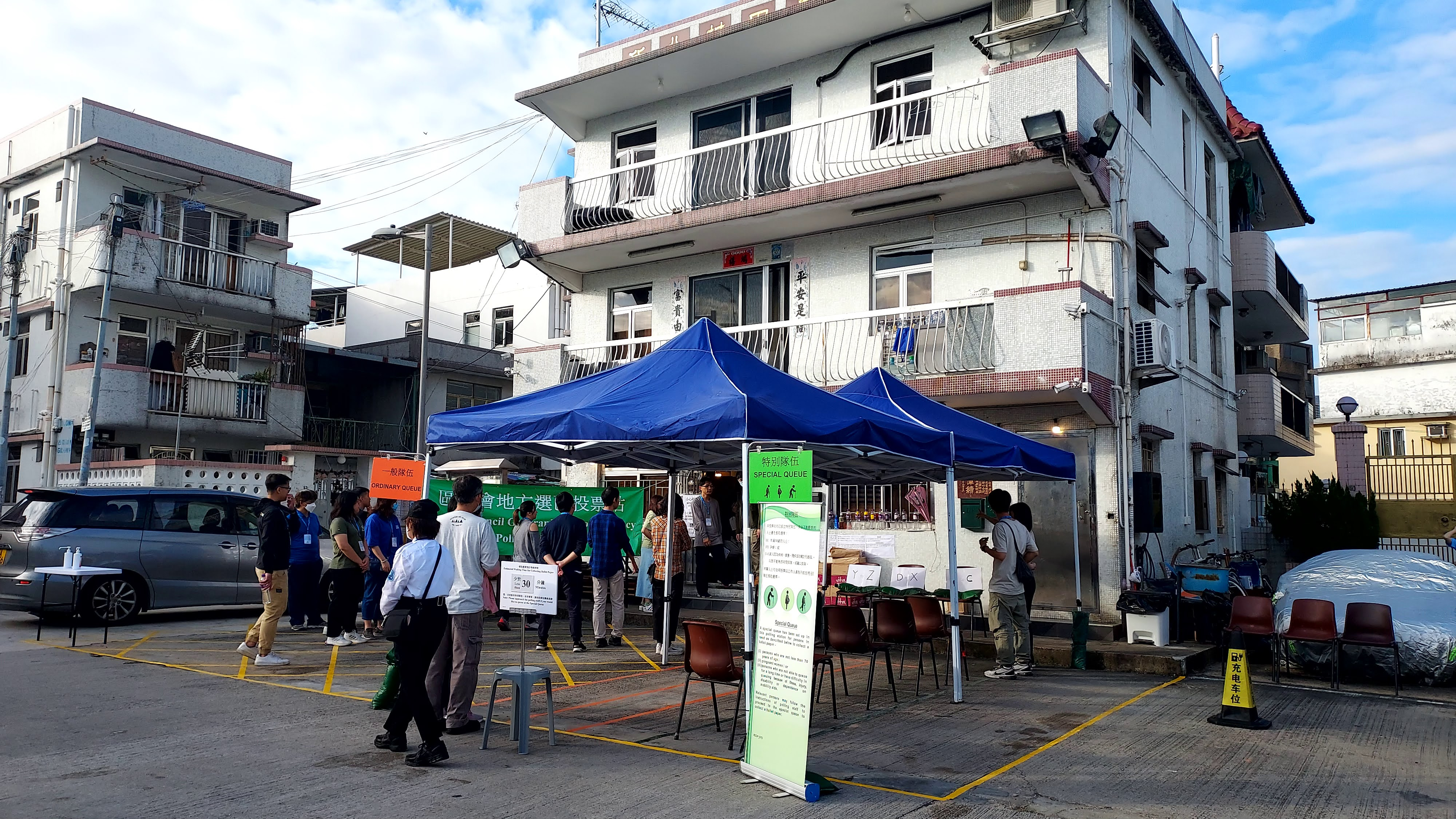
Special queues for elderlies or others in need, contentious proposal rejected in 2020, was implemented in this election

In December 2023, it was reported that the government would spend approximately HK$3.4 million on elderly care centers in order for them to help the elderly vote; in response, Legislative Councillor Doreen Kong cautioned that the government "should ensure that elderly people choose to go voluntarily" and that "the centres should also be sensitive as to whether they will affect the elderly people's voting preference when they walk them to the polling station." Alice Mak later refuted the claim and argued that the subsidies would not affect fairness in the polls. Civil Service Bureau also reportedly warned government outsourcing companies that not allowing sufficient time for staff to vote may undermine further bidding.

Political commentator Sonny Lo Shiu-hing said that "On the surface, the government says the voting rate is not important, but in fact, what it is doing is obviously all about boosting the turnout. After all, the turnout rate reflects the election’s legitimacy to a certain degree."

Under a special programme, the Hong Kong government also set up voting booths close to the border of Mainland China to allow Hongkongers living in Mainland China to more easily cross the border and vote.

By 8 December, the management of the four major real estate developers, including CK Asset Holdings chairman Victor Li Tzar-kuoi, New World Development chief executive Adrian Cheng, Henderson Land Development co-chairmen Peter Lee Ka-kit and Martin Lee Ka-shing, and Sun Hung Kai Properties have stated that they would vote and called on group employees to fulfil their civic responsibilities. Chairman Stewart Leung, President Keith Graham and Secretary-General Loong Hon-biu of the Real Estate Developers Association of Hong Kong also released a promotional video to urge the industry worker to vote.

== Arrests ==
The election law which prohibits inciting others to boycott the election or cast a blank or invalid vote remains in place. A 38-year-old man was arrested, and later charged, days before the poll by anti-graft ICAC officers, after the man allegedly reposted messages from social media inciting others to boycott the elections and call on others to put two ticks on their ballots, which would render them invalid. The ICAC also placed the author of the post, overseas Hong Kong pundit Martin Oei onto a wanted list.

Veteran activist Koo Sze-yiu had planned to stage a protest at the Registration and Electoral Office against an "unfair race" on Friday, citing a lack of candidates from the pro-democracy camp. Koo informed the REO about his demonstration, but he was apprehended by the national security police before he left home on suspicion of attempting or preparing to do an act with a seditious intention. He was later charged and remanded awaiting trial.

The police arrested three members of pro-democracy League of Social Democrats on the poll day, suspected of inciting others to intervene in the District Council elections. Party chairwoman Chan Po-ying and vice-chairs Dickson Chow and Yu Wai-pan were heading to protest outside a polling station where John Lee was expected to cast his vote. Three were also handcuffed on the same day, including a couple for inciting others on social media to put three or more ticks on the ballot paper. Another arrestee, who reposted posts inciting election boycott by former councillor Lee Man-ho, was charged. An arrest warrant was issued against Lee, who had self-exiled to Britain.

== Technical glitch ==
David Lok Kai-hong, chairman of Electoral Affairs Commission (EAC), said the Electronic Poll Register computer system "unexpectedly" failed at 7:42 p.m., which impeded the issuing of ballots, and by 8:12 p.m. all stations had switched to printed-form final registers for issuing ballots. The Commission said there was no evidence of a cyberattack. As a result, Lok said that polling stations will be open until midnight, one and a half hours beyond the original 10:30 p.m.

As the authorities also stopped updating the hourly voter turnout as it may be on track for a record-low turnout, critics questioned the decision to extend voting hours. Lok denied that the arrangement could amount to a measure to boost voter turnout, but expressed regret over the glitch. EAC also came under fire with pro-Beijing camp demanding answers and insisting their candidates have been affected. NPP said the failure deterred evening voters, while FTU said the resulting long queues at polling stations put off voters. Legislator Priscilla Leung of BPA said about 200 voters left a polling station in Shek Kip Mei during the system failure and fewer than 20 returned later to cast their ballots.

In the early morning on Monday, John Lee said he was "highly concerned" about the technical failure and that a task force led by Senior Counsel Bernard Man, the EAC, and police would be set up to investigate the cause. Later that morning at an emotional press briefing, Lok, choking up as he spoke, apologised to candidates, campaign teams and voters, saying he was willing to take responsibility for the blunder. He also said he felt guilty towards the staff, and that the commission would face all criticism seriously, but again rejected claims of attempting to boost the turnout rate. Lok insisted a 90-minute extension was necessary to allow voters who had headed home after learning about the glitch to cast their ballots.

In January 2024, after the elections produced a record-low turnout, lawmakers Priscilla Leung said that the turnout would have been better if it were not for the technical glitches.

Interim investigation by the commission believed the failure of the electronic poll register system was not due to external attacks but rather problems with computer programs that unnecessarily tied up server resources. The investigation found the utilisation rate of the system server’s CPU had reached almost 100%, due to design issues with two programs of the system, which caused computation time to increase as polling went along. Another design issue of the system caused some work requests to unnecessarily take up substantial server resources, creating problems with issuing paper ballots, Man said.

== Results ==
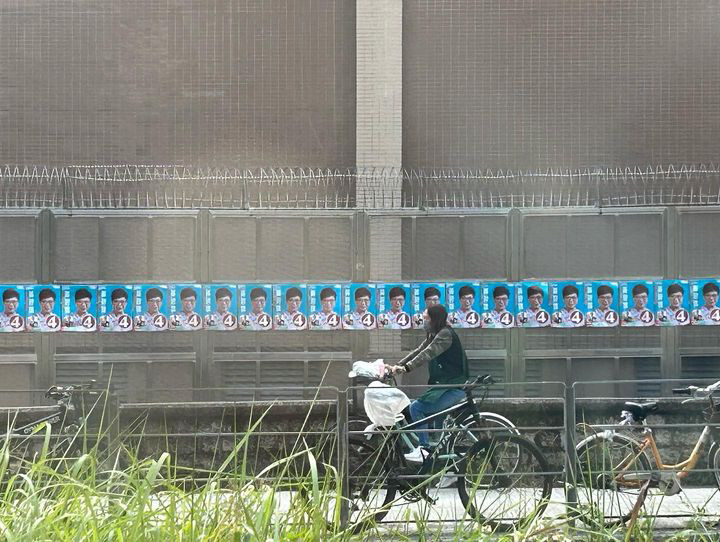
Only 1.19 million voted in the election, marking the lowest in Hong Kong local polls

With only 1.19 million voters casting ballots and 27.5% voter turnout, the election broke the record for the lowest turnout among Hong Kong District Council elections. Despite the lower than rumoured target of 30% set by Chinese authorities, Tam Yiu-chung, a major pro-Beijing politician, said the turnout was in line with expectations.

The largest pro-Beijing party, the DAB, became the largest party in the District Councils, having previously held that title from 2007 until the 2019 elections. The DAB was able to have one candidate elected in all except three geographical constituencies, and also won the largest percentage of the indirectly elected seats. Pro-labour FTU ranked second with 18 seats in direct elections, but was outperformed by the NPP in the District Committees seats.

Small parties with a sole candidate were unsuccessful as Roundtable, Path of Democracy, and Bauhinia Party failed to win any seats. Other minor parties such as New Prospect for Hong Kong and Professional Power were only able to win one seat each. Political commentator James Sung said larger parties have stronger community networks and human resources in the districts, with a greater ability to reach out to and influence voters.

The authorities revealed in the next month that an error was made in calculating the turnout, which was revised from 27.54% to 27.59%, 2,138 votes more than was previously announced, due to the manual calculation of paper ballots by electoral staff, with electors who voted at polling stations in correctional facilities and police stations were omitted from the calculation. David Lok stressed that those omitted ballots had been included in the number of votes obtained by each candidate, and dismissed concerns that the poll result could be legally challenged in light of the latest revelation, insisting all votes had been accurately counted under public scrutiny.

=== Overview of outcome ===
Summary of the 10 December 2023 District Councils of Hong Kong election results
Political Affiliation	Geographical Constituencies						District Committees				GC+DC seats
Political Affiliation	Popular vote	%	% ±	Standing	Elected	±	Electoral vote	%	Standing	Elected	GC+DC seats
Democratic Alliance for the Betterment and Progress of Hong Kong	486,942	41.58	▲24.80	44	41	▲20	9,013	36.13	77	68	109
Hong Kong Federation of Trade Unions	206,285	17.61	▲13.22	25	18	▲13	2,041	8.18	21	9	27
New People's Party–Civil Force	99,775	8.52	▲5.55 (Note: Including vote share of New People's Party and Civil Force in 2019 elections)	17	5	▲4	1,462	5.86	12	10	15
Business and Professionals Alliance for Hong Kong	59,015	5.04	▲2.77	10	4	▲1	1,065	4.27	10	8	12
Professional Power	23,557	2.01	N/A	3	1	N/A	–	–	–	–	1
New Prospect for Hong Kong	21,380	1.83	New	5	1	New	–	–	–	–	1
Liberal Party	19,574	1.67	▲0.73	4	3	▼2	290	1.16	3	2	5
Federation of Public Housing Estates	17,744	1.52	▲0.86	2	2	▼1	234	0.94	2	1	3
Federation of Hong Kong and Kowloon Labour Unions	12,436	1.06	▲1.00	2	0	Steady	180	0.72	2	1	1
Roundtable	7,149	0.61	▼0.28	1	0	▼2	–	–	–	–	0
Path of Democracy	2,118	0.18	N/A	1	0	N/A	–	–	–	–	0
Bauhinia Party	472	0.04	New	1	0	New	–	–	–	–	0
Tseung Kwan O Development Focus Group	–	–	–	–	–	–	126	0.51	2	1	1
Kowloon West New Dynamic	–	–	–	–	–	–	55	0.22	1	0	0
Pro-Beijing Independents	214,701	18.33	▲5.35	56	13	▼10	10,481	42.01	98	76	89
Total	1,171,148	100.00	–	171	88	▼364	24,947	100.00	228	176	264
Total valid votes	1,171,148	98.15	▼1.44				2,446	99.67			
Invalid votes	22,045	1.85	▲1.44				8	0.33			
Total votes / turnout	1,193,193	27.54	▼43.69				2,454	96.92			
Registered voters	4,329,710	100.00	▲4.76				2,532	100.00			

=== Results by district ===
Council	Previous control	Previous party	Post-election control	Largest party	DAB	FTU	NPP/CF	BPA	Lib	Others	Pro-dem	Pro-Beijing (GC+DC)		Appointed & Ex-officio	Composition
Central & Western	Pro-democracy	Liberal	Pro-Beijing	DAB	2+3				1+0	1+5	0+0	4	8	8+N/A	
Wan Chai	Pro-Beijing	Liberal	Pro-Beijing	NOC	1+0				0+1	1+3	0+0	2	4	4+N/A	
Eastern	NOC	NOC	Pro-Beijing	DAB	3+6	2+0	0+1		1+1	0+4	0+0	6	12	12+N/A	
Southern	Pro-Beijing	Liberal	Pro-Beijing	DAB	1+3	2+0	0+1	0+2	1+0	0+2	0+0	4	8	8+N/A	
Yau Tsim Mong	Pro-democracy	Democratic	Pro-Beijing	DAB	2+4	0+1		1+1		1+2	0+0	4	8	8+N/A	
Sham Shui Po	NOC	NOC	Pro-Beijing	DAB	2+3			1+1		1+4	0+0	4	8	8+N/A	
Kowloon City	Pro-Beijing	DAB	Pro-Beijing	DAB	2+2			1+1		1+5	0+0	4	8	8+N/A	
Wong Tai Sin	Pro-democracy	ADPL	Pro-Beijing	DAB	2+2	1+1				1+5	0+0	4	8	8+N/A	
Kwun Tong	Pro-Beijing	DAB	Pro-Beijing	DAB	3+4	2+2				3+10	0+0	8	16	16+N/A	
Tsuen Wan	NOC	NOC	Pro-Beijing	DAB	2+4	1+0				1+4	0+0	4	8	8+2	
Tuen Mun	NOC	ADPL	Pro-Beijing	DAB	3+5	2+1	1+2			0+4	0+0	6	12	13+1	
Yuen Long	Pro-Beijing	NOC	Pro-Beijing	DAB	4+5	1+1				3+10	0+0	8	16	16+6	
North	Pro-Beijing	NOC	Pro-Beijing	DAB	2+7	1+0				1+1	0+0	4	8	8+4	
Tai Po	Pro-democracy	TPDA	Pro-Beijing	DAB	2+3		0+1	1+1		1+3	0+0	4	8	8+2	
Sai Kung	NOC	CGPLTKO	Pro-Beijing	DAB	3+3	1+1	1+2			1+6	0+0	6	12	12+2	
Sha Tin	Pro-democracy	Democratic	Pro-Beijing	NPP/CF	3+4	1+1	3+3			1+8	0+0	8	16	17+1	
Kwai Tsing	Pro-Beijing	DAB	Pro-Beijing	DAB	3+8	3+1		0+2		0+1	0+0	6	12	13+1	
Islands	Pro-Beijing	DAB	Pro-Beijing	DAB	1+2	1+0				0+2	0+0	2	4	4+8	
TOTAL					41+68	18+9	5+10	4+8	3+2	17	0	88	176	206	

=== Vote summary ===
Popular vote
DAB	41.58%
FTU	17.61%
NPP/CF	8.52%
BPA	5.04%
PP	2.01%
NPHK	1.83%
Liberal	1.67%
FPHE	1.52%
FLU	0.61%
Roundtable	0.61%
PoD	0.18%
Bauhinia	0.04%
Independents	18.33%

=== Seat summary ===
Percentage of seats
DAB	41.29%
FTU	10.23%
NPP/CF	5.68%
BPA	4.55%
Liberal	1.89%
FPHE	1.14%
PP	0.38%
NPHK	0.38%
FLU	0.38%
Independents	34.09%

== Aftermath ==
Chief Executive John Lee on 12 December appointed 179 people to the District Councils. The registration of the 27 incumbent chairmen of Rural Committees as ex-officio members was confirmed as valid on the same day. The DAB had a total of 147 seats after Lee appointed 38 DAB members to the councils, further consolidating its status as the largest party.

Ming Pao found that 409 new councillors were also the members of the government-appointed three committees, accounting for 87% of the 470 councillors, while 346 or 74% of them were also members of the district-based Care Teams, which are also appointed by the government. 192 new councillors were the defeated candidates in the previous 2019 elections.

Party	Elected	Appointed	Ex-officio	Total seats
DAB	109	38	0	147
FTU	27	16	0	43
NPP/CF	15	10	0	25
BPA	12	10	2	24
Liberal	5	3	0	8

The government held an oath-taking ceremony for members of the seventh-term District Councils and the councillors assumed their offices on 1 January, with Lee saying during the ceremony that the new members must support the legislation of the planned security law, known locally as Article 23.

=== Cost ===
The total cost was HK$1.2 billion, or about 90% more than the 2019 election. Calculations show that it cost around HK$1,000 per vote.
