= Kingswood South (constituency) =

Constituency of Hong Kong

- Elected constituency for the Yuen Long District Council
- Boundary of Kingswood South in Yuen Long District
- District: Yuen Long
- Legislative Council constituency: New Territories North
- Population: 16,712 (2019)
- Electorate: 9,232 (2019)

Current constituency
- Created: 1999
- Number of members: One
- Member: Vacant

Kingswood South (Chinese: 嘉湖南) is one of the 39 constituencies in the Yuen Long District of Hong Kong.

The constituency returns one district councillor to the Yuen Long District Council, with an election every four years. Kingswood South constituency is loosely based on part of Kingswood Villas in Tin Shui Wai with estimated population of 16,712.

== Councillors represented ==
Election	Member	Party
1994	Daniel Cham Ka-hung	Nonpartisan
2019	Katy Ng Yuk-ying→Vacant	Democratic

== Election results ==
=== 2010s ===
Yuen Long District Council Election, 2019: Kingswood South
Party	Candidate	Votes	%	±%
Democratic	Katy Ng Yuk-ying	3,882	55.13	
Independent	Daniel Cham Ka-hung	3,159	44.87	
Majority		723	10.26	
Turnout		7,065	76.55	
Democratic gain from Independent		Swing		
