= Leung Che-cheung =

Hong Kong politician

The Honourable Leung Che-cheung SBS, MH, JP
- 梁志祥
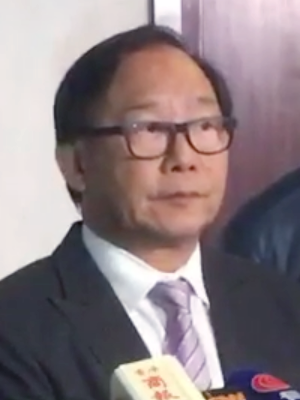

Member of the Legislative Council
- In office 1 October 2012 – 31 December 2021
- Preceded by: New seat
- Succeeded by: Seat abolished
- Constituency: New Territories West

Chairman of the Yuen Long District Council
- In office 10 January 2008 – 31 December 2015
- Preceded by: Tang Siu-tong
- Succeeded by: Sham Ho-kit

Personal details
- Born: 3 December 1957 (age 68) British Hong Kong
- Citizenship: Hong Kong permanent resident
- Party: Democratic Alliance for the Betterment of Hong Kong; New Territories Association of Societies
- Occupation: Legislative Councillor

Leung Che-cheung
- Chinese: 梁志祥
Transcriptions
Standard Mandarin
- Hanyu Pinyin: Liáng Zhìxiáng
Yue: Cantonese
- Jyutping: loeng4 zi3 coeng4

Leung Che-cheung, SBS, MH, JP (Chinese: 梁志祥) (born 3 December 1957 in Hong Kong) is a former member of Hong Kong Legislative Council (Geographical constituency New Territories West) and the former chairman of the Yuen Long District Council for Tin Yiu in Tin Shui Wai. He is a member of Democratic Alliance for the Betterment of Hong Kong, a pro-Beijing party in Hong Kong and the president of the New Territories Association of Societies. He was awarded the Silver Bauhinia Star by the Hong Kong SAR Government in 2017.

== Background ==
In 1998, Leung began serving as vice chairman of Yuen Long District Council, and was elected as chairman in 2008. In 2011, he joined the Election Committee for Regional District Council. Leung was elected as a member of the Legislative Council of Hong Kong

In a town hall meeting on 11 August 2013 in Tin Shui Wai where Chief Executive Leung Chun-ying attended, some thugs-like Leung's supporters allegedly provoked and beat up protesters. Leung Che-cheung who hosted the Town Hall meeting invited a group of triad-related individuals to a dinner party and called in supporters to support Leung prior to the meeting. Tang Sui-man, also known as "Four Eyes Man", representative of the villagers from Wang Toi Shan Ho Lik Pui Tsuen, Tsang Shu-wo, also known as "Tall Man Wo", chairman of Ping Shan Heung Rural Committee and a number of powerful triad related individuals were called into action.

In October 2019, Leung was criticised for his questionable qualification as a member of the Legislative Council after questioning when the council would discuss the controversial anti-mask law that was already passed over 10 days earlier.

In January 2021, after a HK$280 million funding request was passed without any officials present to answer his questions, Leung was informed that he had missed a deadline to request the secretariat to have officials present, despite being a lawmaker for 8 years.

Political offices
New constituency	Member of Yuen Long District Board; Representative for Yiu Yau; 1994–1999	Council abolished
New title	Member of Yuen Long District Council; Representative for Tin Yiu; 2000–2019	Succeeded by Ho Wai-pan
Preceded by Tang Siu-tong	Chairman of the Yuen Long District Council; 2008–present	Succeeded by Sham Ho-kit
Legislative Council of Hong Kong
New seat	Member of Legislative Council; Representative for New Territories West; 2012–2021	Seat abolished
Party political offices
Preceded by Lee Lin-sang	President of New Territories Association of Societies; 2015–present	Incumbent
Order of precedence
Preceded by Ben Chan; Member of the Legislative Council	Hong Kong order of precedence Member of the Legislative Council	Succeeded by Kenneth Leung; Member of the Legislative Council
