= Tin Yiu (constituency) =

Hong Kong constituency

- Elected constituency for the Yuen Long District Council
- Boundary of Tin Yiu in Yuen Long District
- District: Yuen Long
- Legislative Council constituency: New Territories North
- Population: 12,734 (2019)
- Electorate: 8,871 (2019)

Current constituency
- Created: 1994
- Number of members: One
- Member: Vacant

Tin Yiu is one of the 39 constituencies in the Yuen Long District of Hong Kong.

The constituency returns one district councillor to the Yuen Long District Council, with an election every four years. The seat has been currently held by Ho Wai-pan.

Tin Yiu constituency is loosely based on Tin Yiu (I) Estate in Tin Shui Wai with estimated population of 12,734.

== History ==
The seat was held by Leung Che-cheung, member of the Legislative Council for the DAB until 2019.

== Councillors represented ==
Election	Member	Party
1994	Wong Cheung-kwong	Independent
1997	Wong Cheung-kwong	DAB
2003	Leung Che-cheung	DAB
2019	Ben Ho Wai-pan→Vacant	NWSC
2020	Ben Ho Wai-pan→Vacant	Independent

== Election results ==
=== 2010s ===
Yuen Long District Council Election, 2019: Tin Yiu
Party	Candidate	Votes	%	±%
NWSC	Ben Ho Wai-pan	3,513	55.34	
DAB (NTAS)	Calvin Szeto Chun-hin	2,408	37.93	−14.57
Nonpartisan	Leung Chin-hang	372	5.86	−41.64
Nonpartisan	Chan For-yi	55	0.87	
Majority		1,105	17.41	
Turnout		5,356	71.72	
NWSC gain from DAB		Swing		

Yuen Long District Council Election, 2015: Tin Yiu
Party	Candidate	Votes	%	±%
DAB	Leung Che-cheung	1,713	52.5	
Nonpartisan	Leung Chin-hang	1,552	47.5	
Majority		161	7.0	
Turnout		3,315	40.5	
DAB hold		Swing		

Yuen Long District Council Election, 2011: Tin Yiu
Party	Candidate	Votes	%	±%
DAB	Leung Che-cheung	Uncontested		
DAB hold		Swing		

=== 2000s ===
Yuen Long District Council Election, 2007: Tin Yiu
Party	Candidate	Votes	%	±%
DAB	Leung Che-cheung	2,600	68.1	+6.7
LSD	Sam Sin Sheung-chi	1,220	31.9	
DAB hold		Swing		

Yuen Long District Council Election, 2003: Tin Yiu
Party	Candidate	Votes	%	±%
DAB	Leung Che-cheung	2,350	61.4	
Independent	Shiu Yeung-tak	1,479	38.6	
DAB hold		Swing		

=== 1990s ===
Yuen Long District Council Election, 1999: Tin Yiu
Party	Candidate	Votes	%	±%
DAB	Wong Cheung-kwong	Uncontested		
DAB hold		Swing		

Yuen Long District Board Election, 1994: Tin Yiu
Party	Candidate	Votes	%	±%
Independent	Wong Cheung-kwong	1,495	65.7	
Democratic	Hui Kwok-wah	669	29.4	
Liberal	Chan Yan-sang	96	4.2	
Independent win (new seat)				
