= Leung Chau-ting =

Leung Chau-ting (梁籌庭), born around 1950, is the chairperson of the Federation of Civil Service Union, which he helped found in 1984. He was also involved in the founding of the Clerical Grades Civil Servants General Union in 1979.

Having represented civil servants for over 20 years at the Labour Advisory Board, he lost his seat after Federation of Trade Union, a pro-China trade union, switched support to another candidate.

Leung supports the same-sex spouse of civil servants who are in a married overseas be entitled to the same fringe benefits as their different-sex couple counterpart.

== See also ==
- Hong Kong Civil Service
- LGBT rights in Hong Kong
