= New Territories North (2021 constituency) =

Geographical constituency in Hong Kong

- Geographical constituency for the Legislative Council of Hong Kong
- Boundary of New Territories North in Hong Kong
- District: North District; Northern part of Yuen Long District
- Region: New Territories
- Population: 694,200
- Electorate: 431,604

Current constituency
- Created: 2021
- Number of members: Two
- Members: Lau Kwok-fan (DAB); Gary Zhang (NPHK)
- Created from: New Territories East (1998); New Territories West (1998)

The New Territories North geographical constituency is one of the ten geographical constituencies in the elections for the Legislative Council of Hong Kong which elects two members of the Legislative Council using the single non-transferable vote (SNTV) system. The constituency covers North District and northern part of Yuen Long District in New Territories.

== History ==
The constituency was created under the overhaul of the electoral system imposed by the Beijing government in 2021, replacing the North District of the New Territories East and northern part of Yuen Long District (Ha Tsuen, Ping Shan Central, Shing Yan, Tin Yiu, Tin Shing, Tsz Yau, Yiu Yau, Kingswood South, Shui Oi, Shui Wah, Chung Wah, Chung Pak, Kingswood North, Yuet Yan, Ching King, Fu Yan, Yat Chak, Tin Heng, Wang Yat, Ping Shan North, Fairview Park, San Tin) of the New Territories West constituency used from 1998 to 2021. A constituency with the same name were also created for the 1991 and 1995 elections in the late colonial period, while the 1991 constituency also elected two seats with each voter having two votes and the 1995 constituency a similar boundary.

== Returning members ==
Election	Member	Party	Member	Party
2021	Lau Kwok-fan	DAB	Gary Zhang	New Prospect

== Election results ==
=== 2020s ===
2025 Legislative Council election: New Territories North
Party	Candidate	Votes	%	±%
DAB	Yiu Ming			
FTU	Kent Tsang King-chung			
NPP	Michael Liu Tsz-chung			
Nonpartisan	Tam Chun-kwok			
Independent	Wilson Shum Ho-kit			
Total valid votes				
Rejected ballots				
Turnout				
Registered electors		409,281		
		Swing		
		Swing		

Vote share
1. DAB (58.4%)
2. New Prospect (24.0%)
3. Nonpartisan (17.6%)

2021 Legislative Council election: New Territories North
Party	Candidate	Votes	%	±%
DAB	Lau Kwok-fan	70,584	58.38	
New Prospect	Gary Zhang Xinyu	28,986	23.97	
Independent	Shum Ho-kit	17,839	14.75	
Nonpartisan	Judy Tzeng Li-wen	3,498	2.89	
Total valid votes		120,907	100.00	
Rejected ballots		2,348		
Turnout		123,255	28.56	
Registered electors		431,604		
DAB win (new seat)				
New Prospect win (new seat)				
