= New Prospect for Hong Kong =

New Prospect for Hong Kong 香港新方向
- Convenor: Marco Liu
- Founded: October 2019
- Membership (2021): ~100
- Ideology: Conservatism (HK); Gang Piao Interests
- Regional affiliation: Pro-Beijing camp
- Colours: Turquoise
- Legislative Council: 0 / 90
- District Councils: 1 / 470

Website
- www.nphk.hk

New Prospect for Hong Kong (Chinese: 香港新方向) is a political group established in October 2019 consisting mainly of mainland Chinese living in Hong Kong, dubbed "gang piao" in Mandarin.

== Background ==
The party was initially formed in October 2019 during the 2019-2020 Hong Kong protests. Its co-founder Gary Zhang was a manager at the Prince Edward station during the Prince Edward station attack on 31 August 2019 and had said that "Hongkongers are not rioters". The other co-founders included lawyer Paul Wang from Haldanes, and Marco Liu, founder of the PR company Hong Kong Asia Cultural Dissemination.

In the 2021 Legislative Council election, Gary Zhang ran in the New Territories North, receiving nominations from HKU professor Yuen Kwok-yung, former HKEx CEO Charles Li, Cheung Kong Holdings managing director Justin Chiu and MTR CEO Jacob Kam.

== Elections performance ==
=== Legislative council elections ===
Election	Number of popular votes	% of popular votes	GC seats	FC seats	EC seats	Total seats	+/−	Position
2021	28,986	2.19	1	0	0	1 / 90	1▲	8th▲
2025	Did not contest		0	0	0	0 / 90	1▼	

=== District Council elections ===
Election	Number of popular votes	% of popular votes	Total seats	+/−
2023	21,380	1.79	1 / 470	1▲

== See also ==
- Bauhinia Party
- New immigrants in Hong Kong
