= Gary Zhang =

Hong Kong politician (born 1989)

Ir. the Honourable Gary Zhang
- 張欣宇
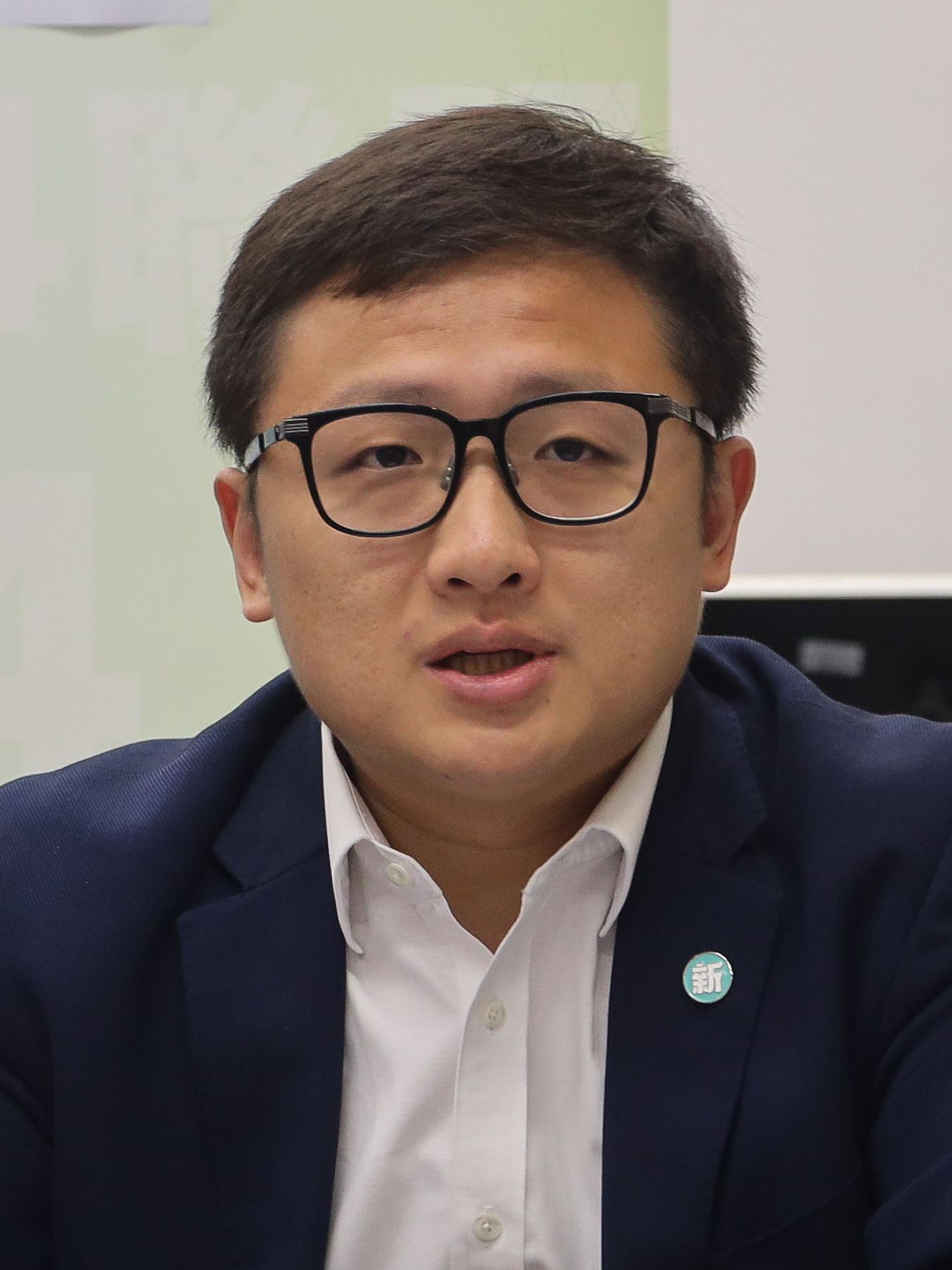
- Zhang in 2023

Member of the Legislative Council
- Incumbent
- Assumed office 1 January 2022
- Preceded by: Constituency created
- Constituency: New Territories North

Personal details
- Born: 1989 (age 36–37) Shanghai, China
- Citizenship: China
- Party: New Prospect

Gary Zhang Xinyu (Chinese: 張欣宇, born 1989) is a Mainland Chinese-born Hong Kong politician and engineer who represented New Prospect for Hong Kong in the 2021 Hong Kong legislative election and was elected as a Legislative Council member for New Territories North.

== Biography ==
Zhang was born in Shanghai and immigrated to Hong Kong with his family as a teenager. Prior to entering politics, he trained as a railway engineer and worked as an MTR station manager. Zhang was known as the supervisor of Prince Edward Station during the attack that took place there in August 2019. At that time, he called for an independent investigation of the incident.

== Electoral history ==
2021 legislative election: New Territories North
Party	Candidate	Votes	%	±%
DAB	Lau Kwok-fan	70,584	58.38	N/A
New Prospect	Zhang Xinyu	28,986	23.97	N/A
Independent	Shum Ho-kit	17,839	14.75	N/A
Independent	Judy Tzeng Li-wen	3,498	2.89	N/A

Legislative Council of Hong Kong
New constituency	Member of Legislative Council; Representative for New Territories North; 2022-present	Incumbent
