= Bauhinia Party =

Hong Kong political party (2020-present)

Bauhinia Party 紫荊黨
- President: Wong Chau-chi
- Chairperson: Li Shan
- Founder: Li Shan; Wong Chau-chi; Chen Jianwen
- Founded: 1 March 2020; 6 years ago
- Headquarters: 31/F, Tower 2, Times Square, 1 Matheson Street, Causeway Bay, Hong Kong
- Membership (2020): 13
- Ideology: Chinese nationalism Conservatism (HK)
- Regional affiliation: Pro-Beijing camp
- Colours: Purple and Red
- Executive Council: 0 / 33
- Legislative Council: 0 / 90
- District Councils: 0 / 470
- NPC (HK deputies): 0 / 36
- CPPCC (HK members): 1 / 124

Website
- www.bauhinia.hk

The Bauhinia Party is a Pro-Beijing political party in Hong Kong. It was founded in 2020 by a cohort of mainland Chinese executives employed in the financial institutions of Hong Kong. The party has been seen as oriented towards the "haigui" community in Hong Kong, referring to mainland Chinese students who have returned to Hong Kong after completing their studies abroad.

== Background ==
Named after the city's official flower bauhinia × blakeana, the Bauhinia Party was established in March 2020 and officially registered with the Hong Kong Companies Registry in May. Its founders, Li Shan, Wong Chau-chi, and Chen Jianwen, were mainland Chinese executives employed at prominent financial institutions in Hong Kong. Li, born in Sichuan, educated in the United States, and with 20 years of experience in Hong Kong, served as a Hong Kong delegate to the national committee of the Chinese People's Political Consultative Conference (CPPCC) and was a director on Credit Suisse's board. Wong also born on the mainland and was educated at the Harvard University before he worked at Goldman Sachs, Citibank and BNP Paribas and was then the chairman and chief executive of CMMB Vision and a director of private equity fund Chi Capital. Both Li and Wong are heard to hold higher-up positions in Hong Kong's Chinese Communist Party School Commercial Professionals Alumni Association (CAGA).

The party remained relatively unknown to the public until an exclusive interview by the South China Morning Post in December 2020. The predominance of the mainland "Haigui" drew a lot of speculation from the media owing to alleged links to the Chinese Communist Party, the party was perceived to be closely aligned to the Beijing authorities and worked as the underground Communist Party operatives, and to sideline or replace the existing local pro-Beijing parties who had failed to support the SAR administration. The local pro-Beijing parties dismissed any speculation of the Bauhinia becoming the threat to them. James Tien of the pro-business Liberal Party believed that Beijing did not want to tilt the balance of power by replacing the incumbents with a group of lesser-known, mainland-born people. Regina Ip of the New People's Party said the new party must prove itself with electoral success as it was not easy to win seats.

== Platform ==
According to the document in the Companies Registry, the party seeks to "promote a democratic political system best suited to Hong Kong based on the rule of law and civil liberty with the realisation of universal suffrage as guaranteed by the Basic Law, so as to safeguard Hong Kong's long-term prosperity and stability." Some of the platforms include:

- Seeking for "another fifty years – unchanged – and have a hundred years of One Country, Two Systems";
- Loving China and Hong Kong, safeguarding the rule of law and opposing discrimination against communities;
- Turning the Legislative Council into a bicameral legislature of which the members of the lower house would be directly elected, while members of the upper house would be appointed by the Chief Executive through a political consultative committee; and
- Establishing a public-private partnership to finance the Lantau Tomorrow Vision plan, a 1,700-hectare project to build a metropolis on man-made islands off Lantau.

The party aims at recruiting more than 250,000 members from all across the sectors. It will also set up a think tank and public opinion survey institution and plans to offer candidates for Legislative Council and Chief Executive elections.

== See also ==
- Chinese Communist Party
- Hong Kong Liaison Office
- New Hong Kong Alliance
- New immigrants in Hong Kong
- New Prospect for Hong Kong
- United Front (China)
