= Sun Yuen Long Centre =

Housing estate in Yuen Long, Hong Kong

Coordinates: 22.445619°N 114.035049°E

- Chinese: 新元朗中心
- Literal meaning: New Yuen Long Centre
Transcriptions
Standard Mandarin
- Hanyu Pinyin: Xīn Yuán Lǎng zhōngxīn
Yue: Cantonese
- Jyutping: san1 jyun4 long5 zung1 sam1

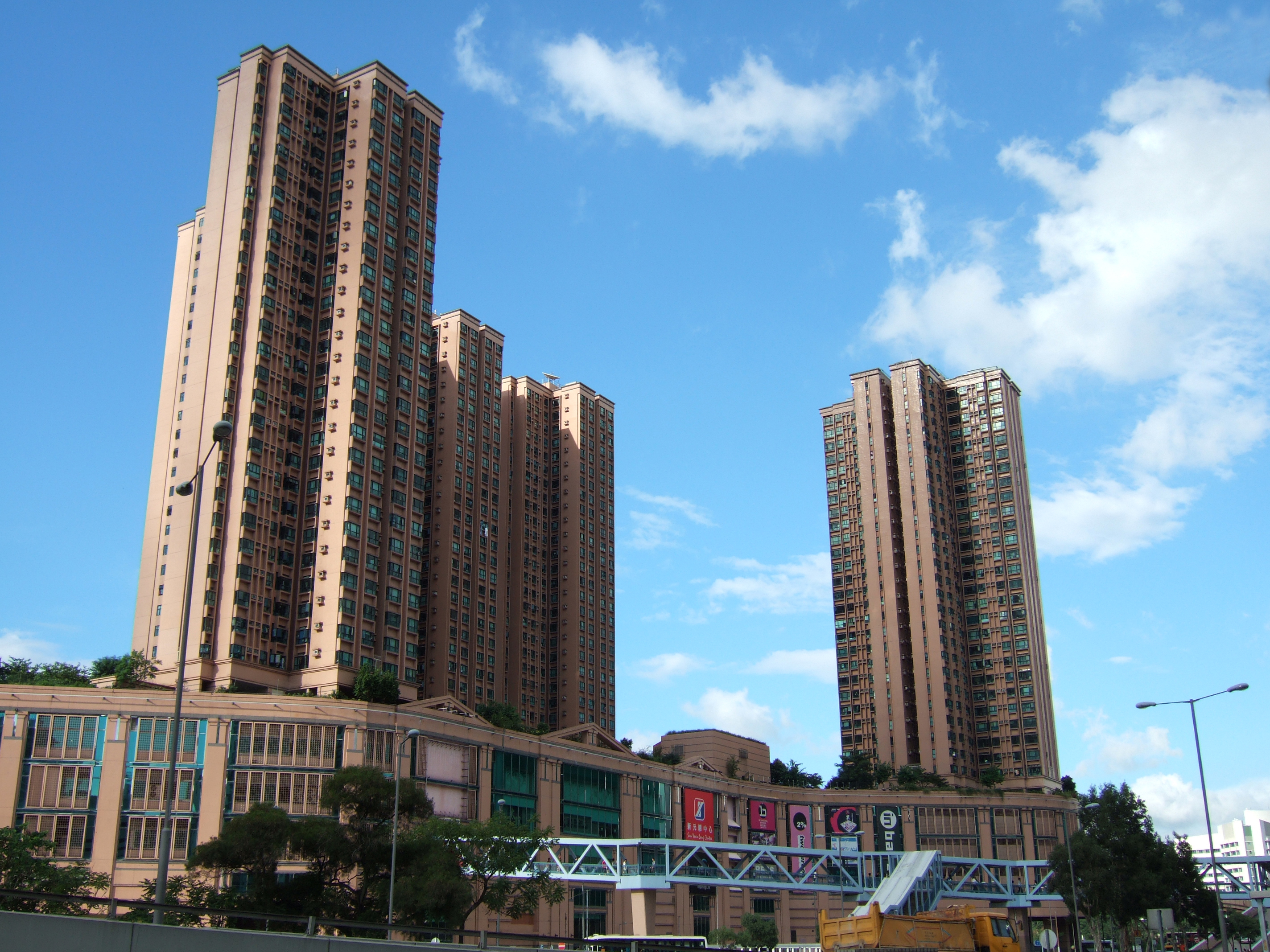
Sun Yuen Long Centre

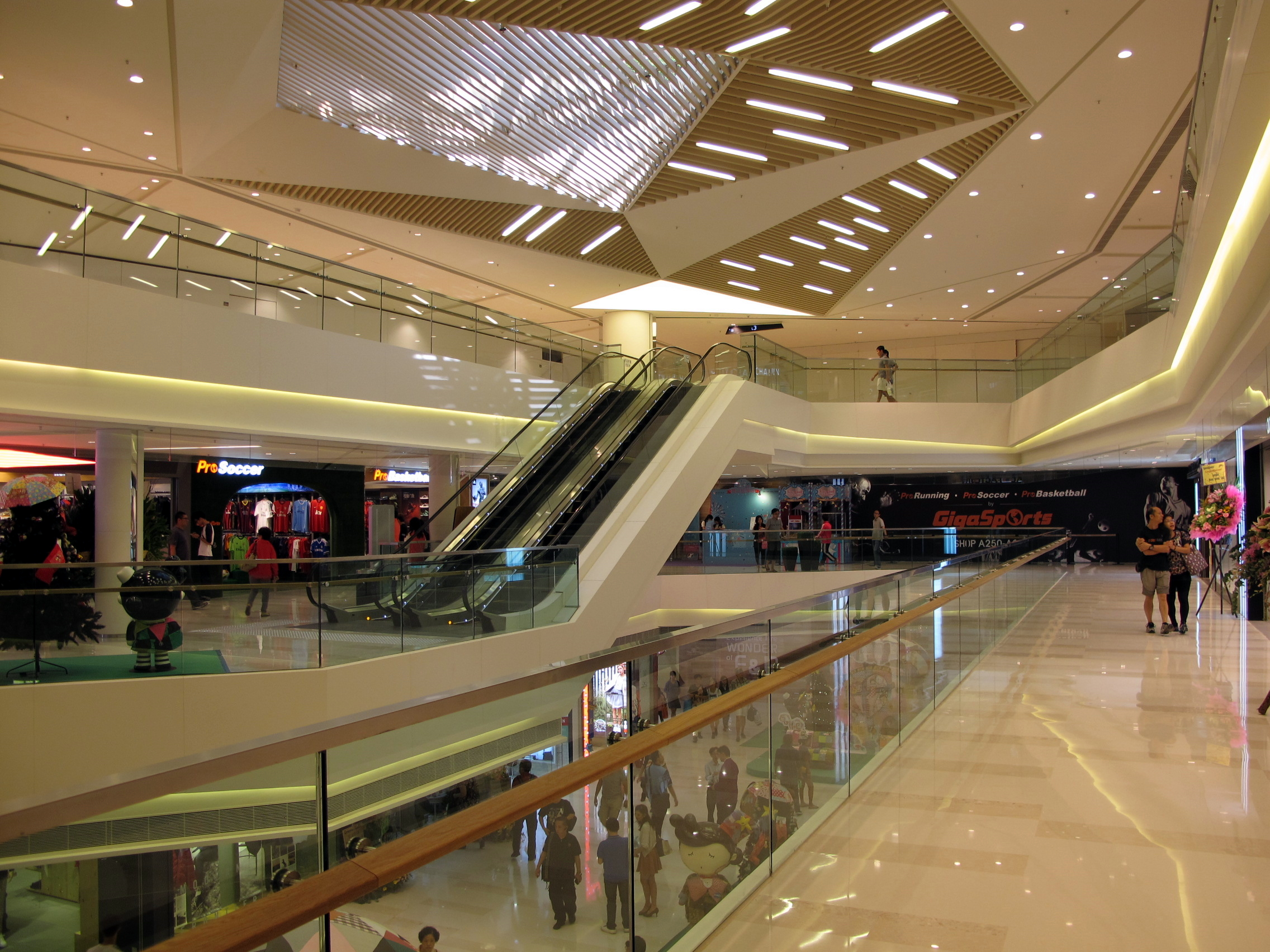
Sun Yuen Long Centre Shopping Centre after renovation (2013)

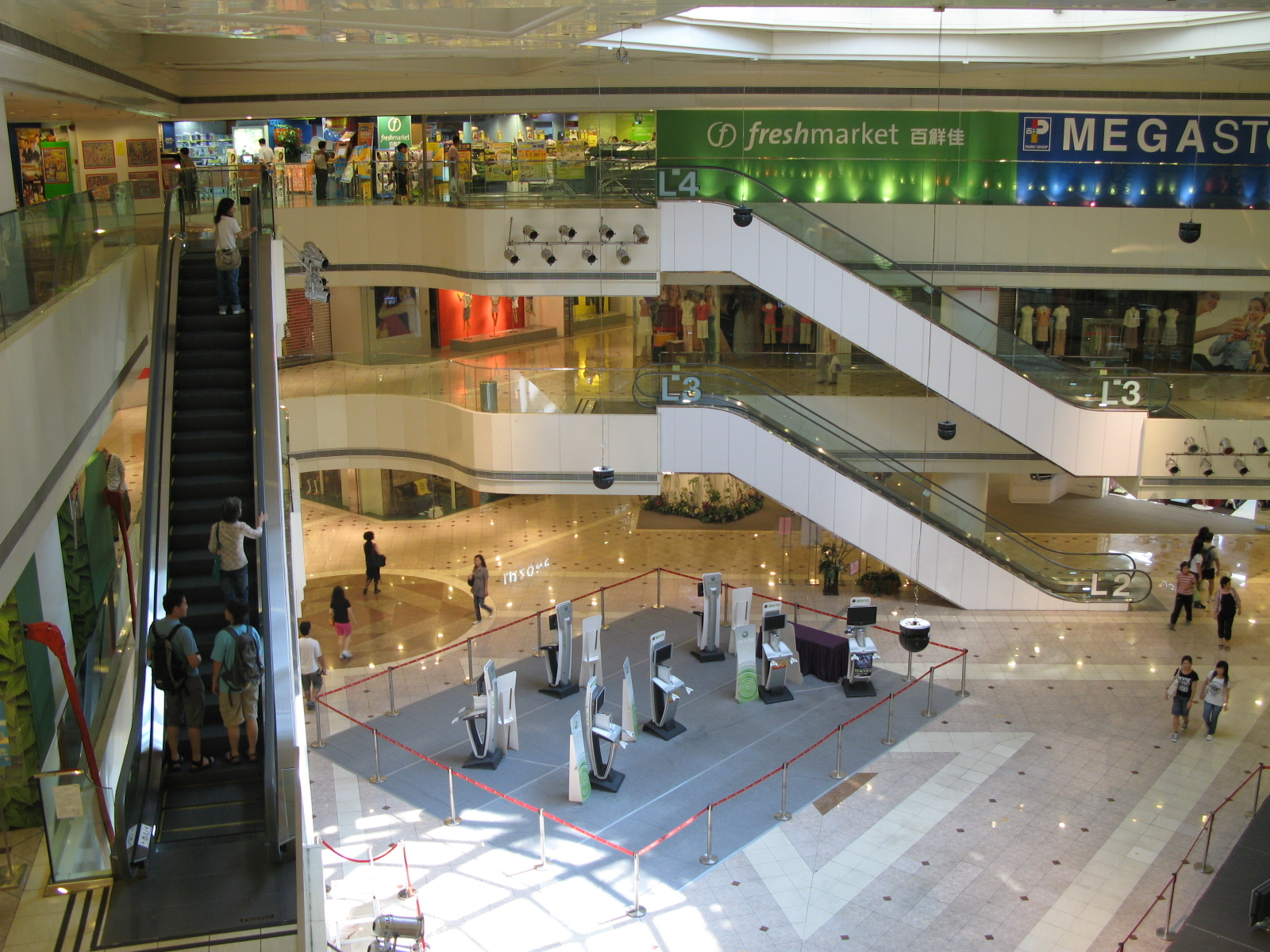
Sun Yuen Long Centre Shopping Centre before renovation (2007)

Sun Yuen Long Centre (Chinese: 新元朗中心) is a private housing estate and shopping centre in Yuen Long, New Territories, Hong Kong, above Light Rail Yuen Long stop and next to MTR Tuen Ma line Yuen Long station. It consists of five 31-floor high-rise buildings developed in 1993 by Sun Hung Kai Properties and Kowloon-Canton Railway Corporation (now MTR Corporation).

== Shopping mall ==
In December 2011, Sun Yuen Long Centre Shopping Centre began an extensive interior renovation. Starting on 1 September 2015, it became Yoho Mall II (形點 II) when at the same time opened a new shopping mall on the opposite called YOHO MALL I along Castle Peak Road (Yuen Long).
