= Fung Nin Road stop =

MTR station in New Territories, Hong Kong

Coordinates: 22°26′40″N 114°01′26″E

Fung Nin Road 豐年路
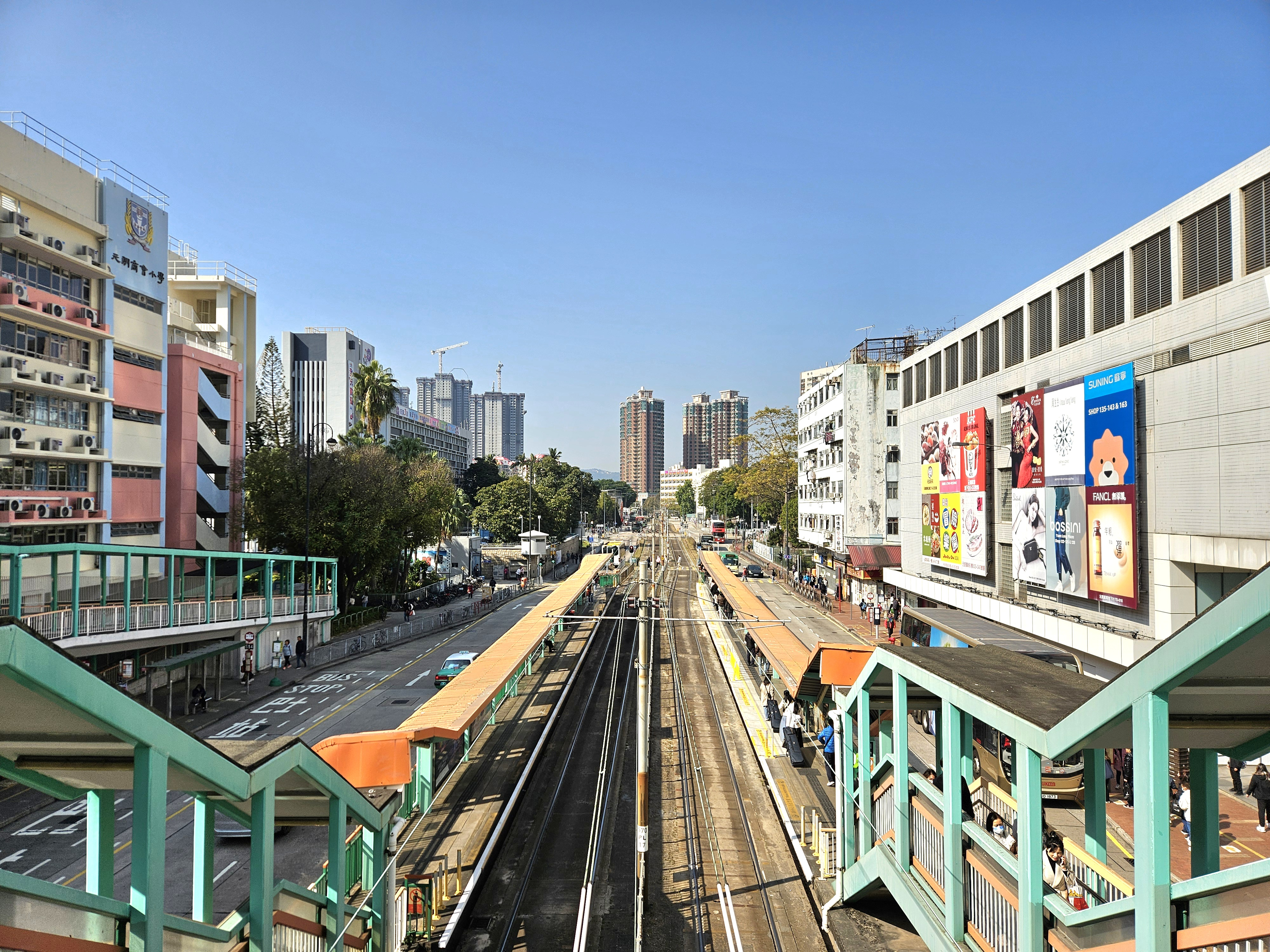
- Appearance of Fung Nin Road stop

General information
- Location: Fung Nin Road; Yuen Long District; Hong Kong
- System: MTR Light Rail stop
- Owner: KCR Corporation
- Operator: MTR Corporation
- Line: 610 614 615 761P
- Platforms: 2 side platforms
- Tracks: 2
- Connections: Bus, minibus

Construction
- Structure type: At-grade
- Accessible: yes

Other information
- Station code: FNR (English code); 570 (Digital code)
- Fare zone: 5

History
- Opened: 18 September 1988; 37 years ago

Services
Preceding stop	MTR Light Rail	Following stop
Shui Pin Wai towards Tuen Mun Ferry Pier	610	Hong Lok Road towards Yuen Long
Shui Pin Wai towards Tuen Mun Ferry Pier	614	Hong Lok Road towards Yuen Long
Shui Pin Wai towards Tuen Mun Ferry Pier	615	Hong Lok Road towards Yuen Long
Shui Pin Wai towards Tin Yat	761P	Hong Lok Road towards Yuen Long
Location
- Location within MTR

Fung Nin Road (Chinese: 豐年路), formerly Town Hall (Chinese: 大會堂), is an at-grade MTR Light Rail stop located at the junction of Castle Peak Road and Fung Nin Road in Yuen Long District. It began service on 18 September 1988 and belongs to Zone 5. It serves Fung Nin Road and Yuen Long Plaza.
