= Hong Lok Road stop =

MTR station in New Territories, Hong Kong

Coordinates: 22°26′40″N 114°01′38″E

Hong Lok Road 康樂路
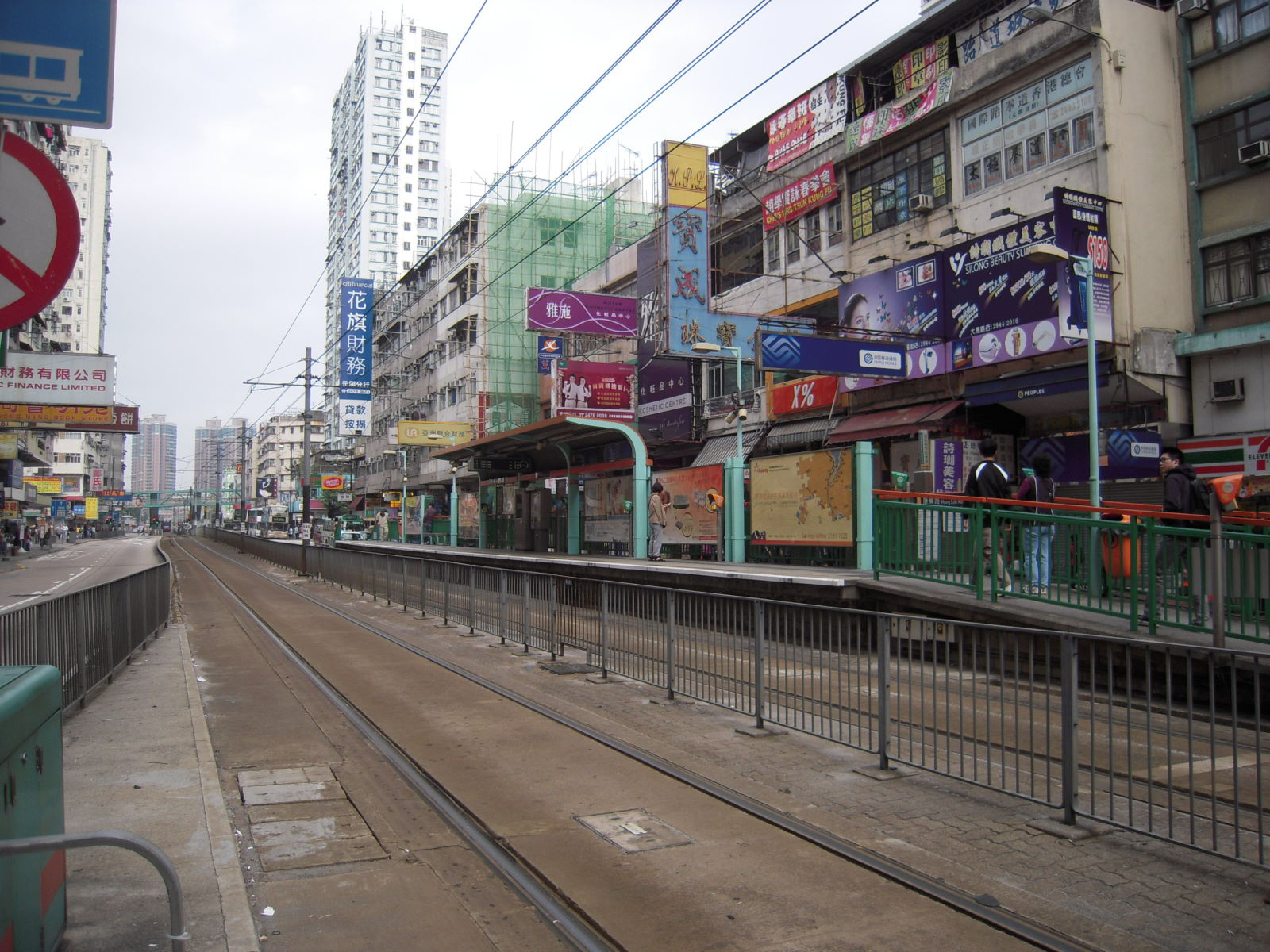
- Hong Lok Road stop platform 1

General information
- Location: Castle Peak Road – Yuen Long; Yuen Long District; Hong Kong
- System: MTR Light Rail stop
- Owner: KCR Corporation
- Operator: MTR Corporation
- Line: 610 614 615 761P
- Platforms: 2 side platforms
- Tracks: 2
- Connections: Bus, minibus

Construction
- Structure type: At-grade
- Accessible: yes

Other information
- Station code: HLR (English code); 580 (Digital code)
- Fare zone: 5

History
- Opened: 18 September 1988; 37 years ago

Services
Preceding stop	MTR Light Rail	Following stop
Fung Nin Road towards Tuen Mun Ferry Pier	610	Tai Tong Road towards Yuen Long
Fung Nin Road towards Tuen Mun Ferry Pier	614	Tai Tong Road towards Yuen Long
Fung Nin Road towards Tuen Mun Ferry Pier	615	Tai Tong Road towards Yuen Long
Fung Nin Road towards Tin Yat	761P	Tai Tong Road towards Yuen Long
Location
- Location within MTR

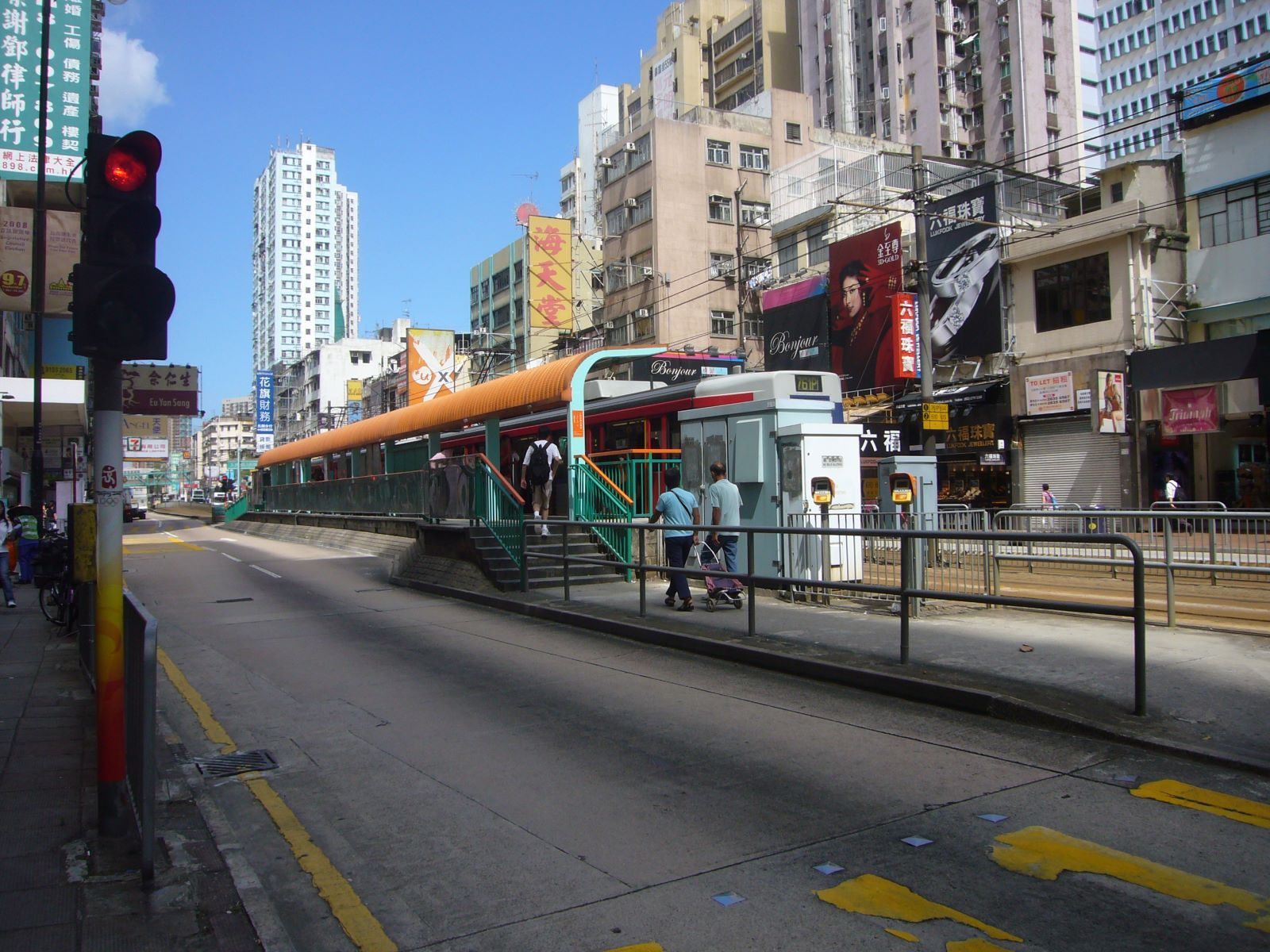
Hong Lok Road stop platform 2

Hong Lok Road (Chinese: 康樂路) is an at-grade MTR Light Rail stop located at the junction of Castle Peak Road and Hong Lok Road in Yuen Long District. It began service on 18 September 1988 and belongs to Zone 5.
