= Yuen Long station =

MTR station in the New Territories, Hong Kong

Yuen Long 元朗
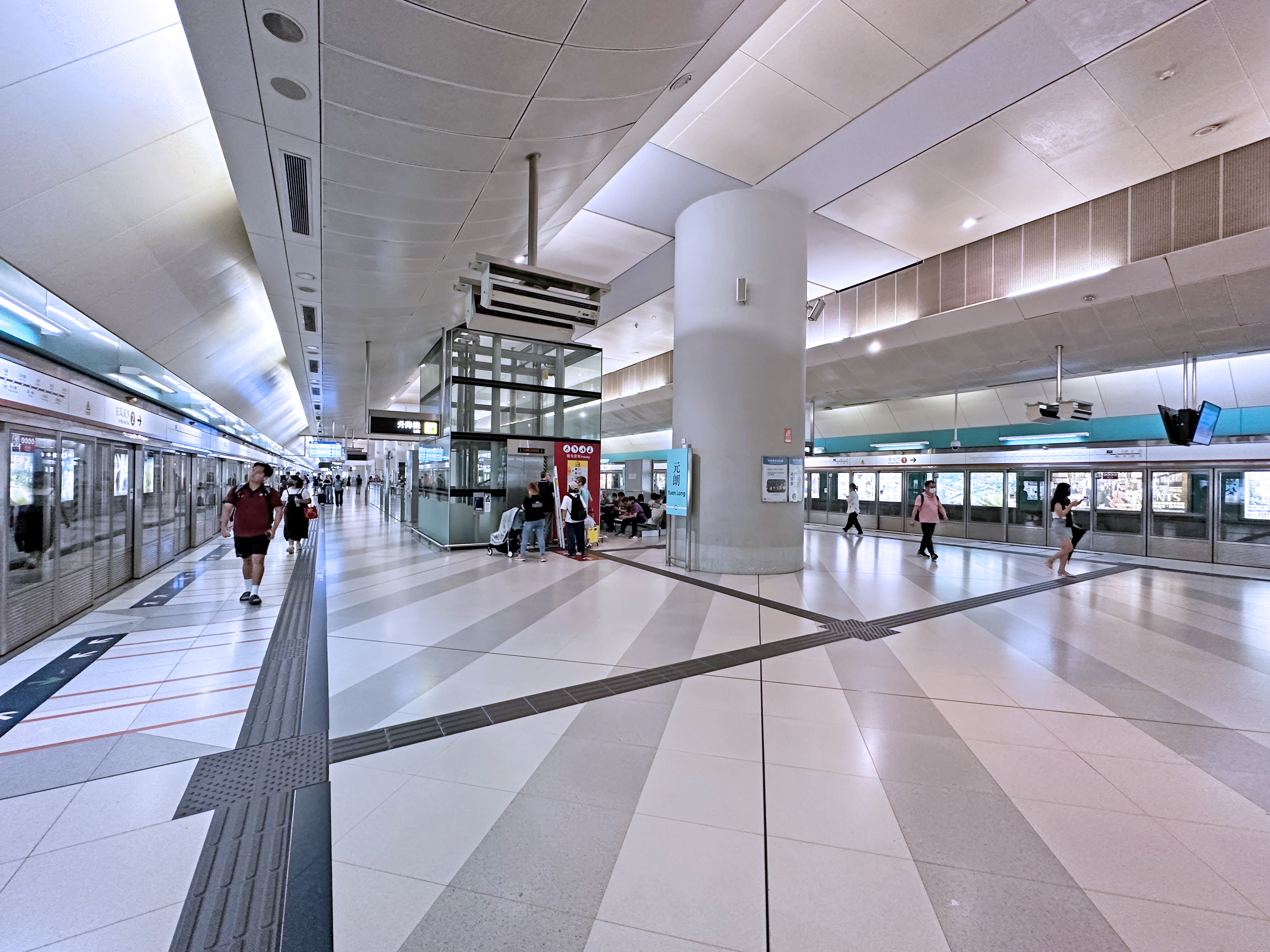
- Yuen Long station platform

Chinese name
- Chinese: 元朗
- Cantonese Yale: Yùnlóhng
- Literal meaning: Fertile Wetland
Transcriptions
Standard Mandarin
- Hanyu Pinyin: Yuánlǎng
Yue: Cantonese
- Yale Romanization: Yùnlóhng

General information
- Location: Long Yat Road × Long Ming Street, Yuen Long; Yuen Long District, Hong Kong
- Coordinates: 22°26′46″N 114°02′07″E
- System: MTR rapid transit station
- Owner: KCR Corporation
- Operator: MTR
- Line: Tuen Ma line
- Platforms: 2 (1 island platform)
- Tracks: 2
- Connections: Yuen Long stop: Routes: 610, 614, 615, 761P; Bus, public light bus

Construction
- Structure type: Elevated
- Accessible: Yes
- Architect: Rocco Design Architects

Other information
- Station code: YUL

History
- Opened: 20 December 2003; 22 years ago

Services
Preceding station	MTR	Following station
Long Ping towards Tuen Mun	Tuen Ma line	Kam Sheung Road towards Wu Kai Sha
Preceding stop	MTR Light Rail	Following stop
Tai Tong Road towards Tuen Mun Ferry Pier	610 transfer at Yuen Long	Terminus
Tai Tong Road towards Tuen Mun Ferry Pier	614 transfer at Yuen Long	Terminus
Tai Tong Road towards Tuen Mun Ferry Pier	615 transfer at Yuen Long	Terminus
Tai Tong Road towards Tin Yat	761P transfer at Yuen Long	Terminus
Track layout
Location
- Location within MTR

Yuen Long (Chinese: 元朗) is an MTR station in the north-eastern part of Yuen Long Town, New Territories, Hong Kong, on the Tuen Ma line between Kam Sheung Road and Long Ping. It is an interchange between the Tuen Ma line and Yuen Long stop of the Light Rail system. The station's livery is ice blue.

== History ==
Yuen Long and Long Ping station were built under a combined contract, numbered CC-202, which was awarded to the AMEC-Hong Kong Construction Joint Venture. The contract, worth HK$1.76 billion, commenced in September 1999. Piling was completed at Yuen Long station in November 2001, while the superstructure and civil works were completed by March 2002. A topping-out ceremony for both Yuen Long and Long Ping stations was held on 24 May 2002.

The station opened on 20 December 2003 with the inauguration of the West Rail.

A new station exit (Exit K), linking the station concourse to Yoho Mall, was opened on 31 May 2017.

On 27 June 2021, the West Rail line officially merged with the Ma On Shan line (which was already extended into the Tuen Ma line Phase 1 at the time) in East Kowloon to form the new Tuen Ma line, as part of the Shatin to Central link project. Hence, Yuen Long was included in the project and is now an intermediate station on the Tuen Ma line.

== 2019 Yuen Long attack (721 incident) ==
On the night of 21 July 2019, an armed mob of alleged triad members dressed in white indiscriminately attacked civilians on streets with steel rods and rattan canes and attacked passengers in the station including the elderly, children, black-clad protesters, journalists and lawmakers. At least 45 people were injured in the incident, including a pregnant woman. The incident and the alleged mishandling of the police prompted a series of protests around Yuen Long, expanding the extent of Hong Kong's anti-extradition bill protests.

== Station layout ==
P Platforms	Platform 2	Tuen Ma line towards Wu Kai Sha (Kam Sheung Road) →
P Platforms	Island platform, doors will open on the right
P Platforms	Platform 1	← Tuen Ma line towards Tuen Mun (Long Ping)
C	Concourse	Customer services, toilets
C	Concourse	MTRShops, ticket machines, ATMs
G	Light Rail stop	Exits, Light Rail Yuen Long stop, public transport interchange

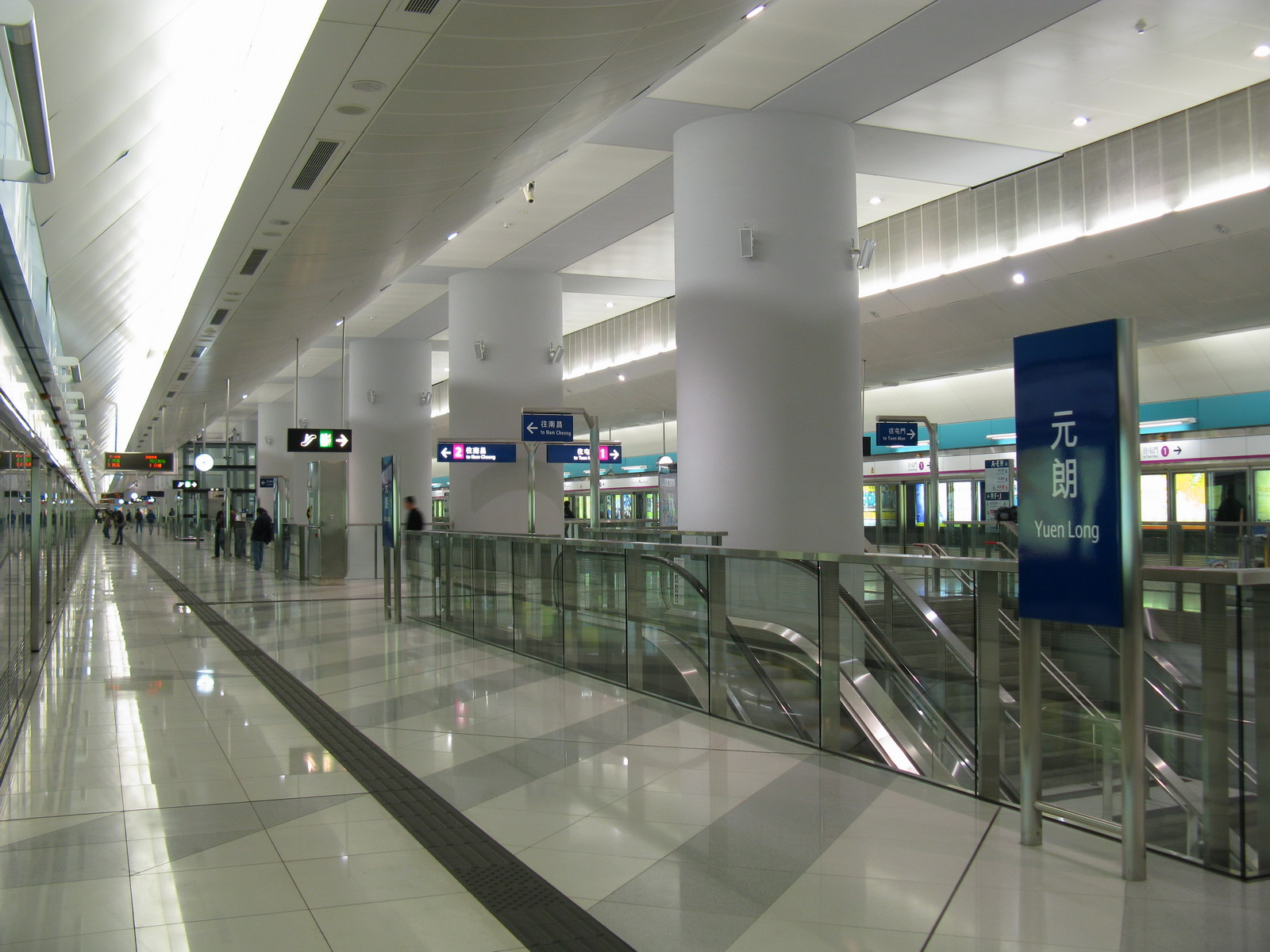
Yuen Long Station platform (December 2008)

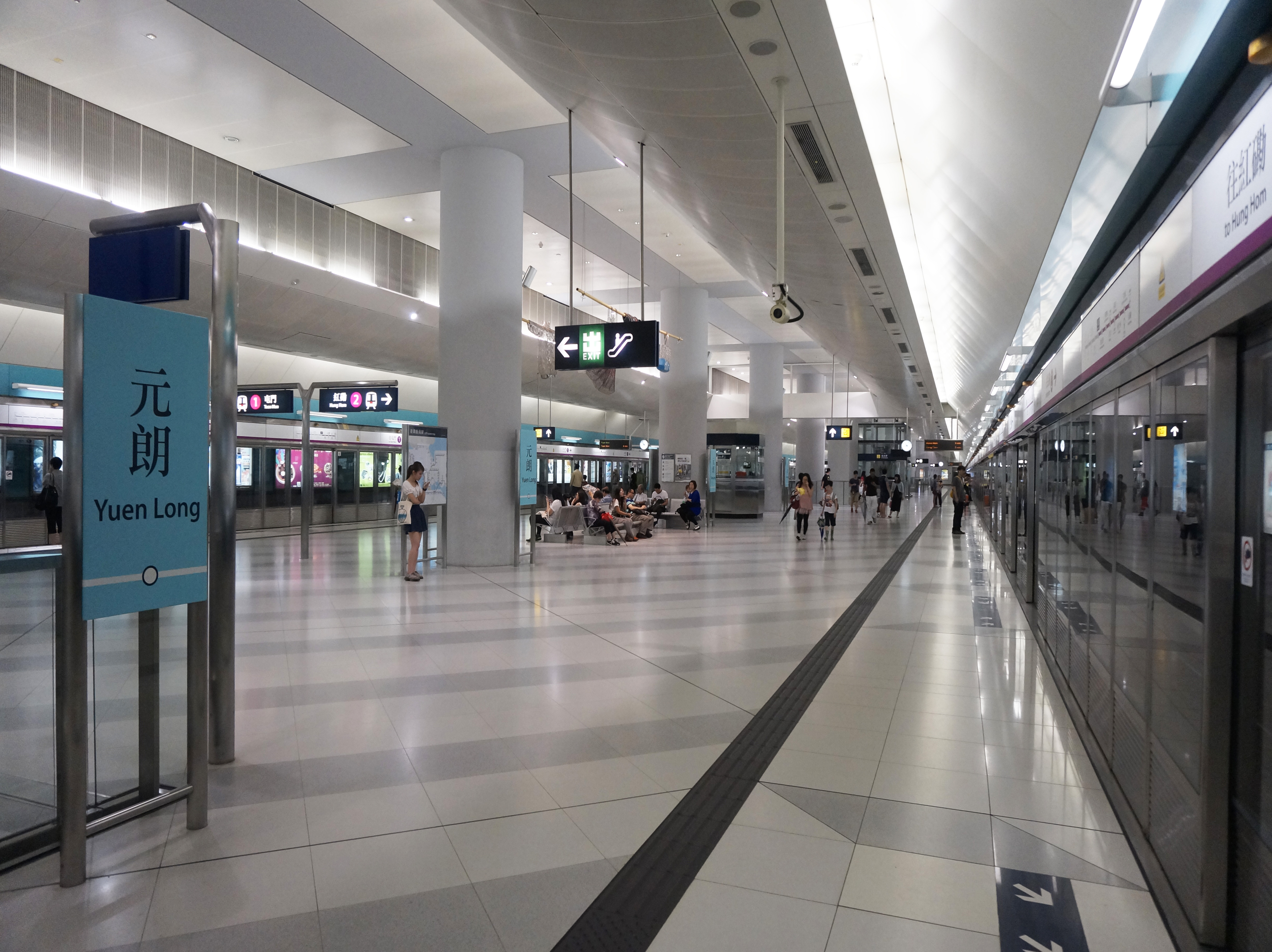
Yuen Long Station Platforms (August 2013)

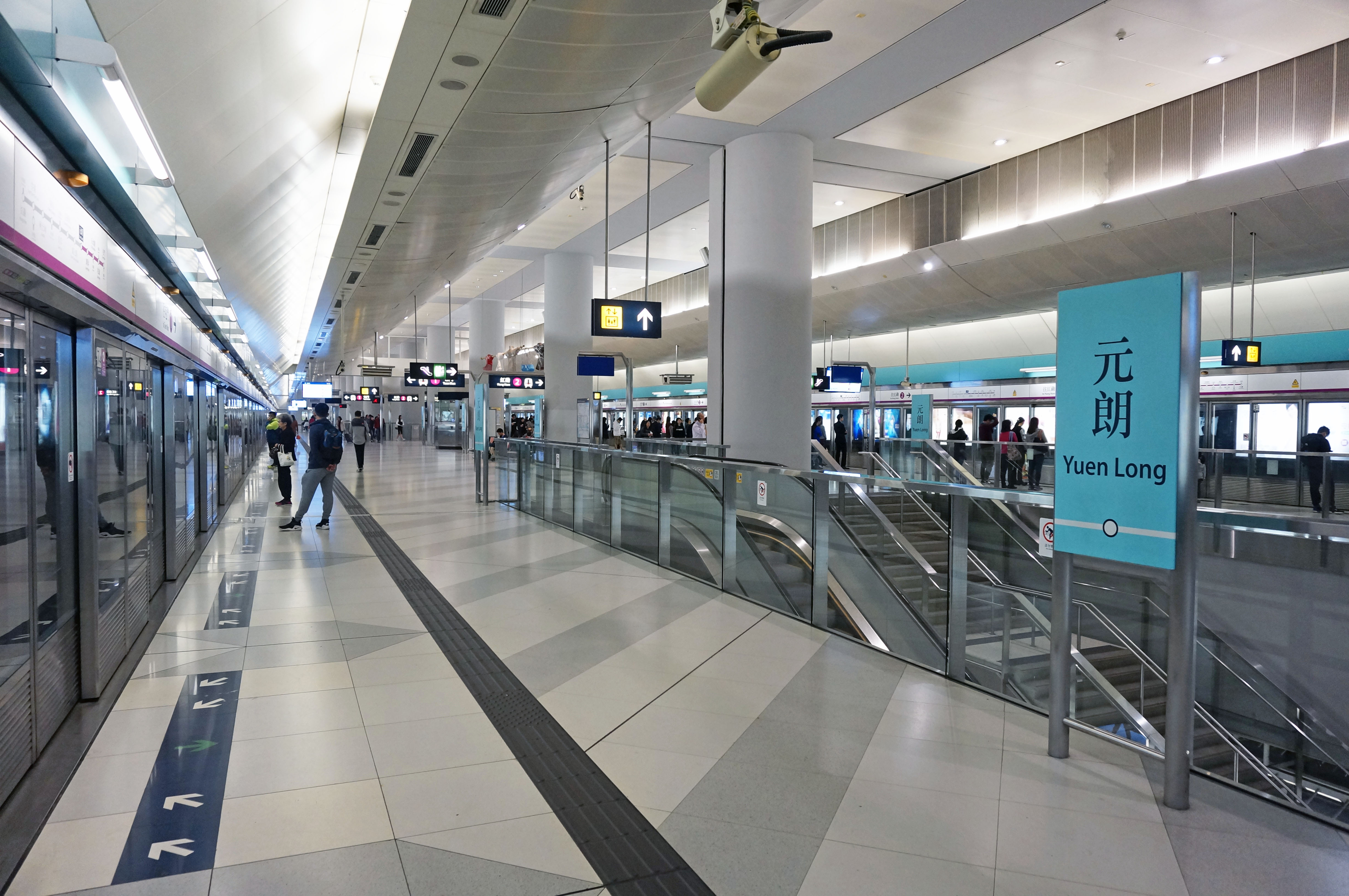
Yuen Long Station Platforms (December 2017)

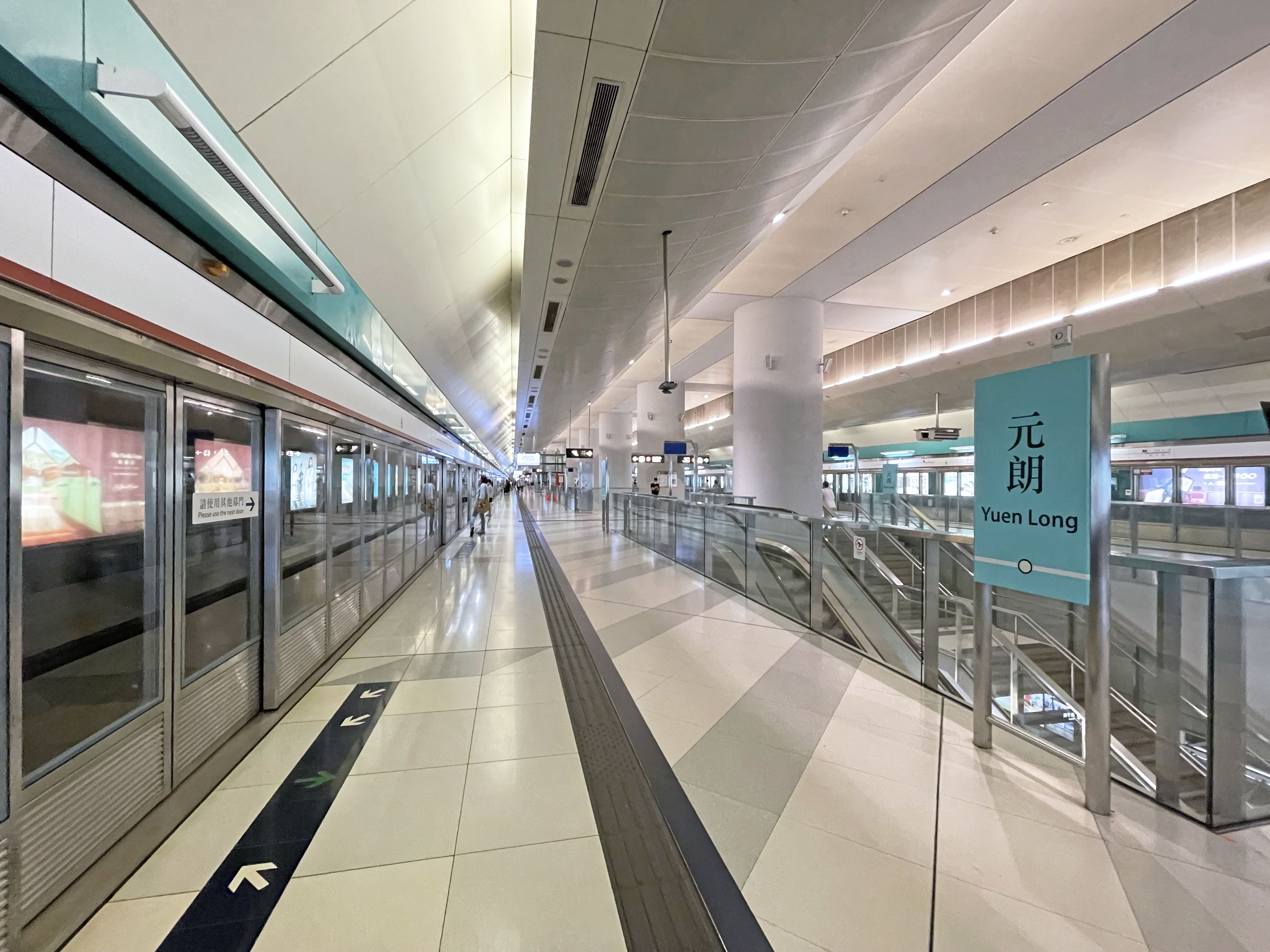
Yuen Long Station Platforms (July 2021)

It is an elevated through station with one island platform.

== Entrances/exits ==
- A: Long Yat Road
- B: Nam Pin Wai
- C: Yoho Mix
- E: Light Rail
- F: Yoho Mall II
- G1: Light Rail
- G2: Tung Tau Tsuen
- H: Pok Oi Hospital
- J: Ying Lung Wai
- K: Yoho Mall I

Exits C and D are reserved.

== Gallery ==
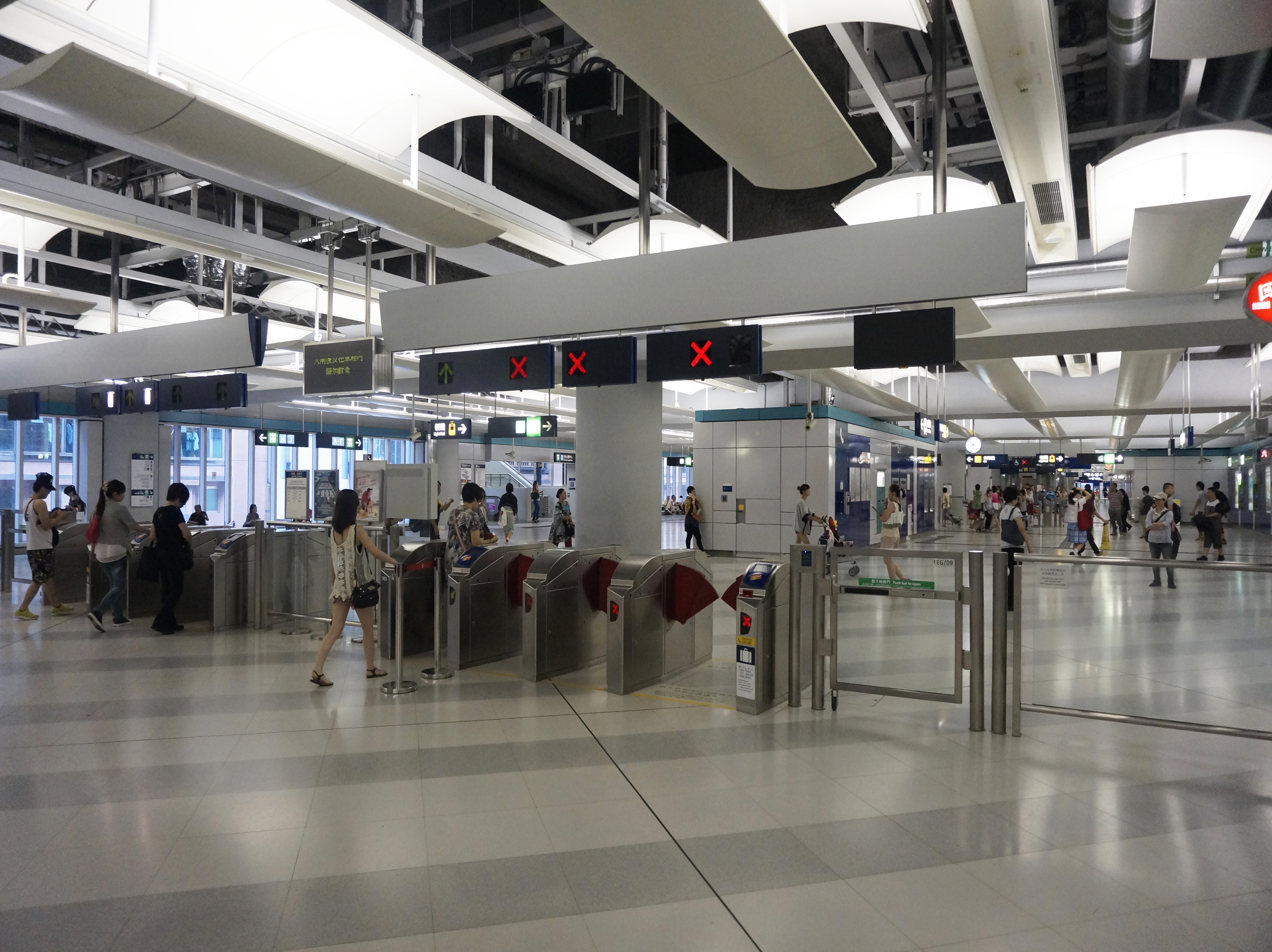
Yuen Long station concourse

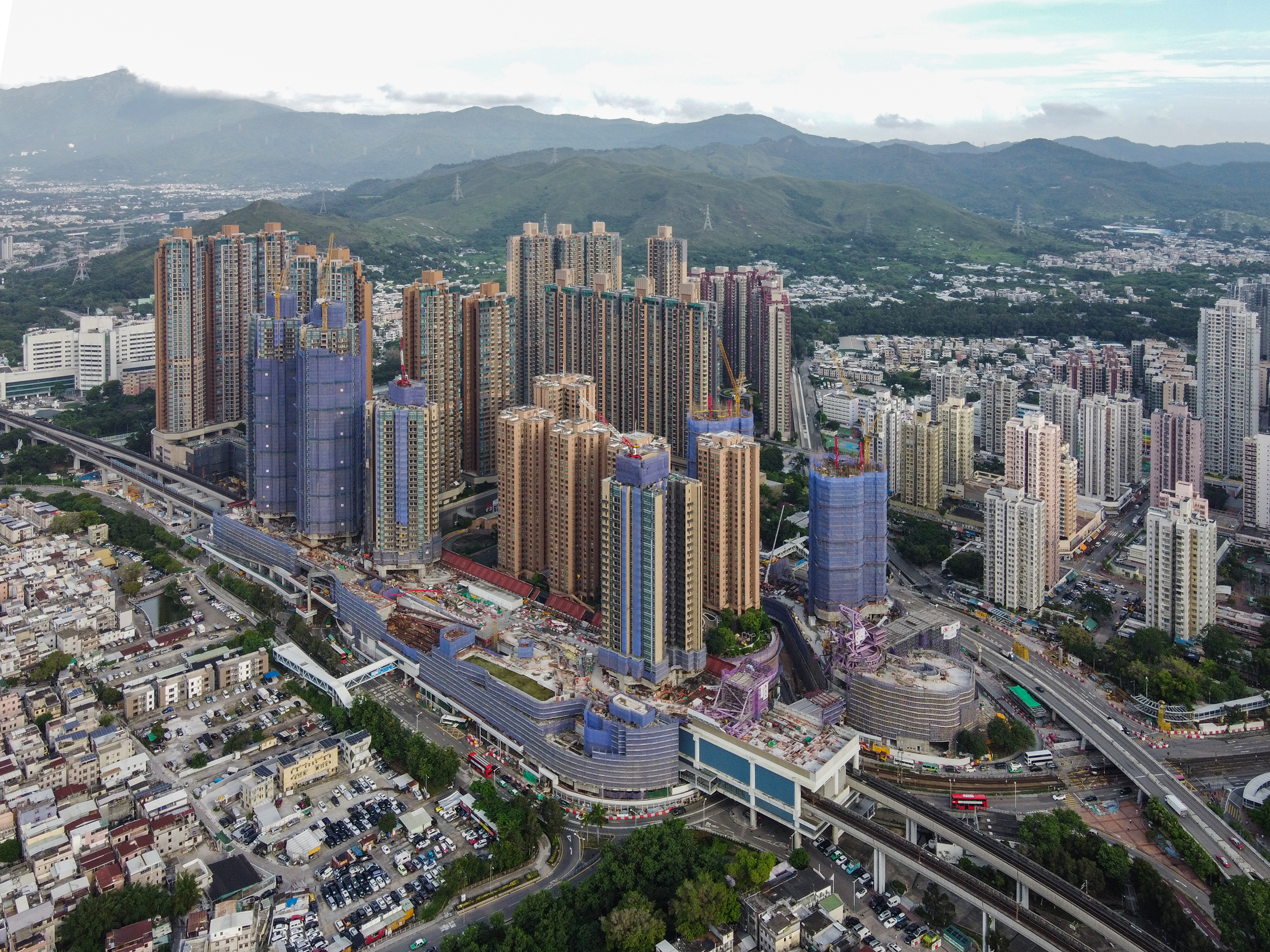
Yuen Long station property "YOHO Hub"

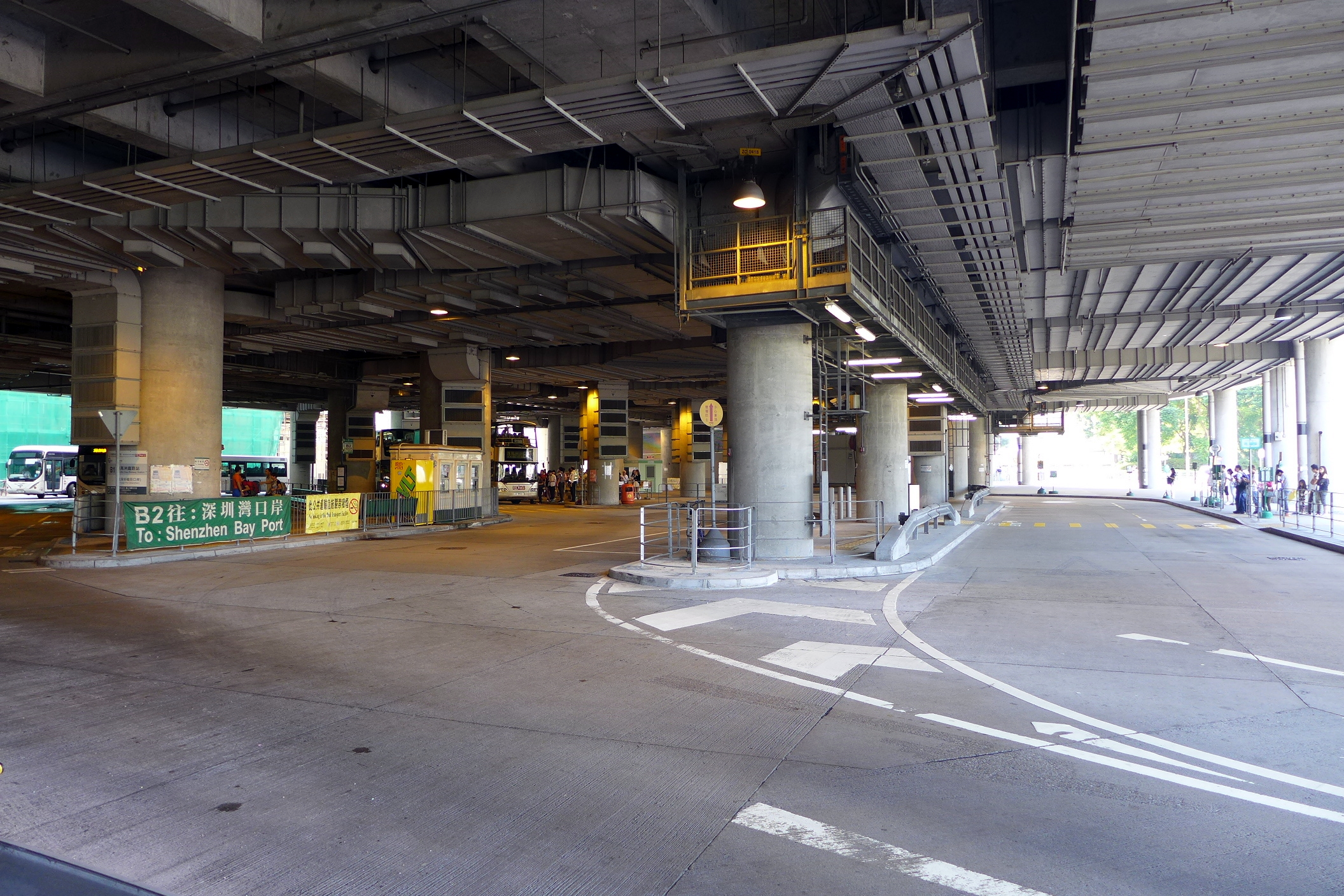
Yuen Long Station Public Transport Interchange

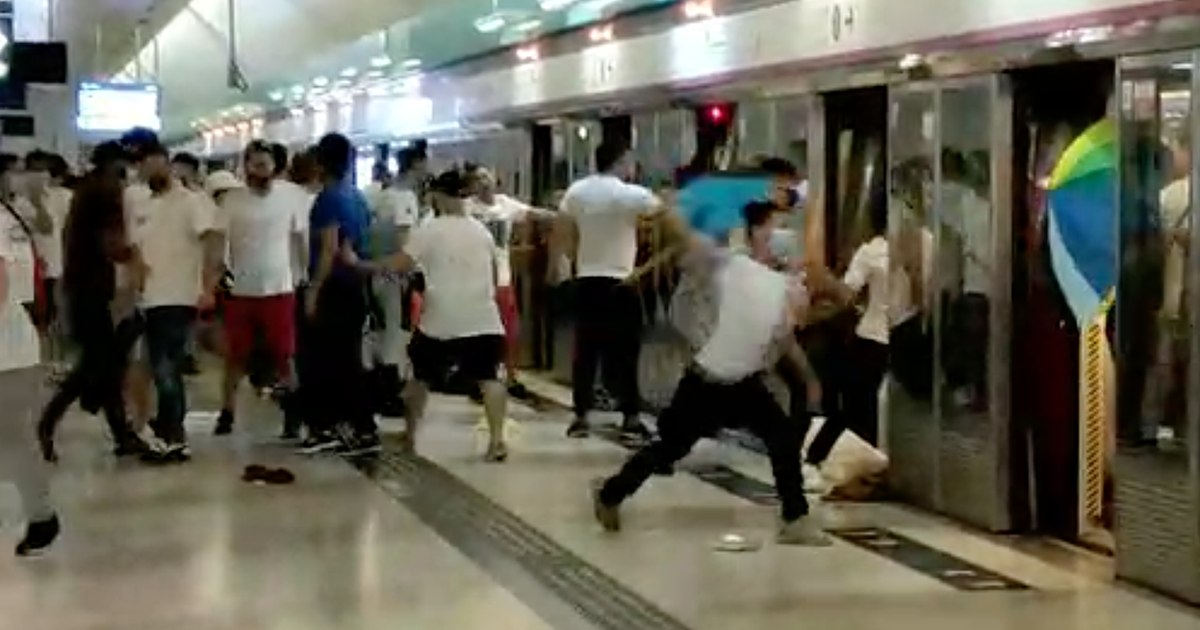
Mob dressed in white attacking passengers at Yuen Long station platform

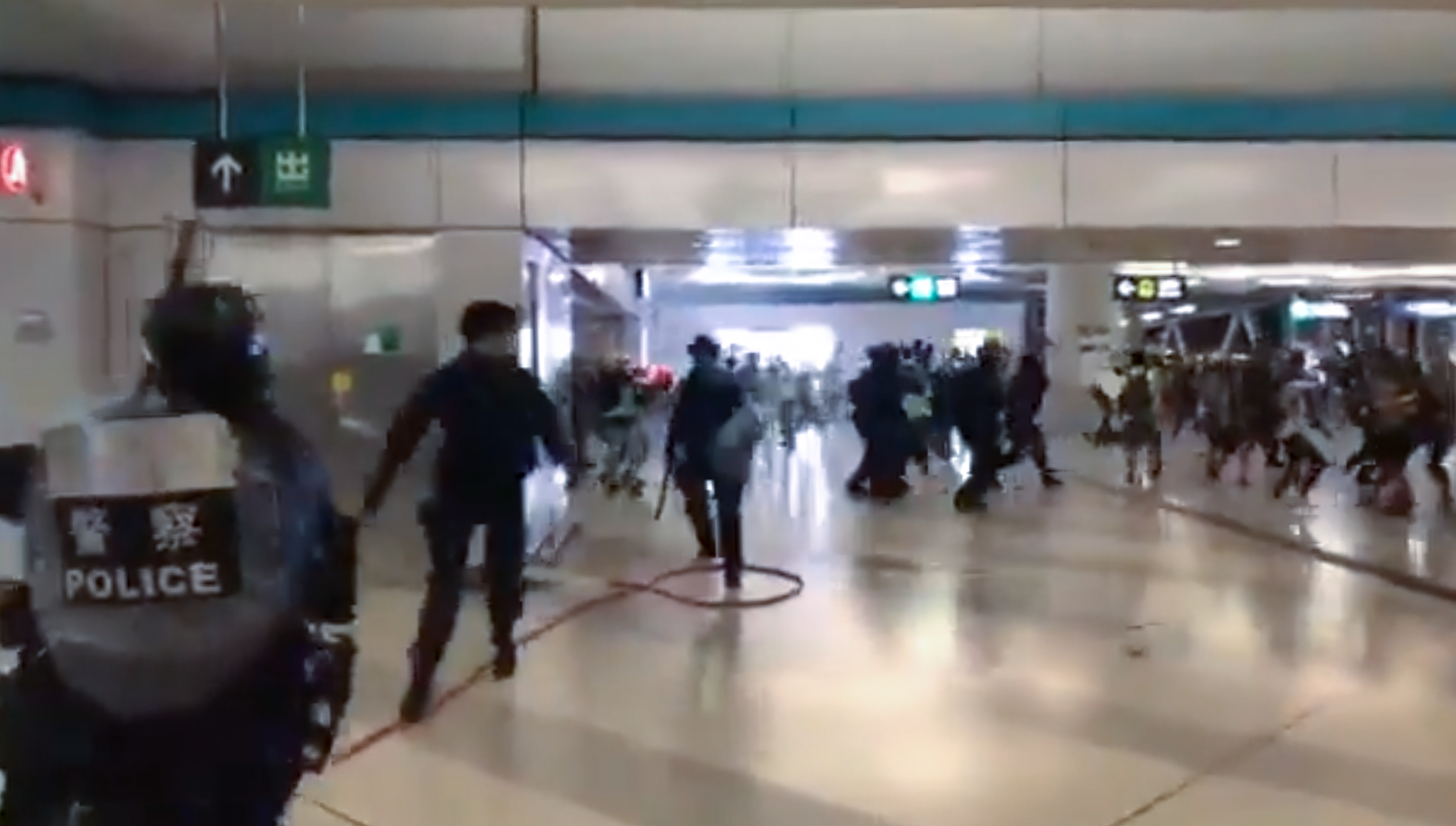
Special Tactical Squad run into Yuen Long Station concourse on July 27 2019

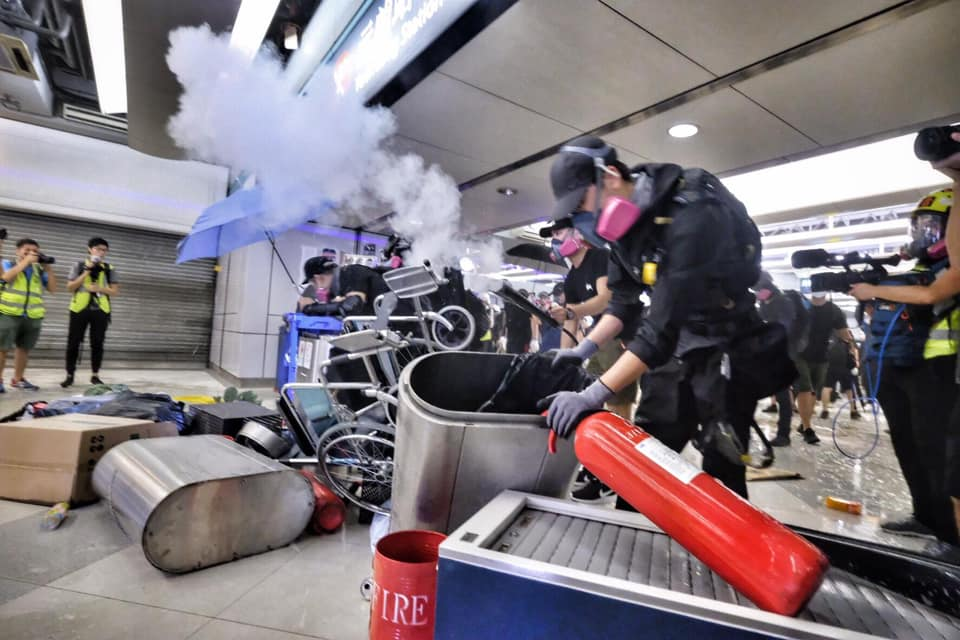
Protester make roadblock for 2019 Yuen Long attack one month anniversary
