= Yoho Mall =

Shopping centre in Yuen Long, Hong Kong

YOHO Mall 形點

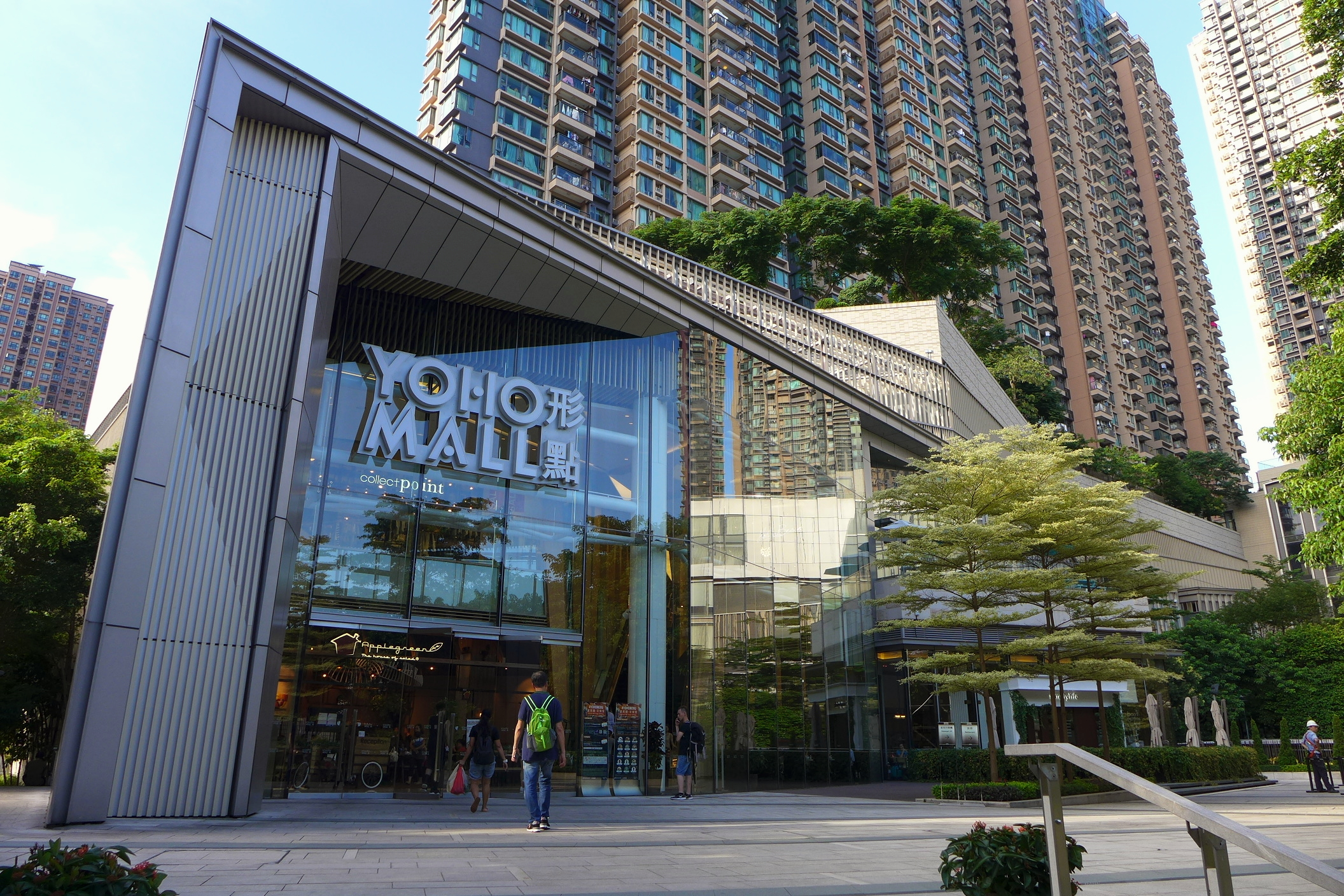
- YOHO Mall
- Location: 9 Long Yat Road (YOHO Mall 1); 8 Long Yat Road (YOHO Mall 2); Yuen Long, Hong Kong
- Coordinates: 22.44528°N 114.03721°E
- Opened: Sun Yuen Long Centre: 1994; 32 years ago YOHO Mall 1: 1 September 2015; 11 years ago YOHO Mall 1 extension: 21 July 2017; 9 years ago
- Developer: Sun Hung Kai Properties
- Manager: Kai Shing Management Services Limited
- Owner: Sun Hung Kai Properties
- Architect: AGC Design
- Num. of stores: 300
- Floor area: 1,100,000 sq ft (100,000 m^{2})
- Floors: 3 (G, L1, L2)
- Website: yohomall.hk

YOHO Mall is a shopping centre in Yuen Long, New Territories, Hong Kong, near Light Rail Yuen Long stop and MTR Yuen Long station. It is part of Sun Hung Kai Properties's "Yoho" housing development.

== History ==
The YOHO Midtown mall was finished in October 2010. It was planned to be opened in 2013. However, after the completion of the second phase of YOHO, the developers hope to enhance the attractiveness of the shopping malls through the renovation of the nearby Sun Yuen Long Centre. According to the Rating and Valuation Department, this will attract several extra hundred million dollars of revenue in terms of rent. Sun Hung Kai Properties announced that YOHO City Shopping Center will be combined with New Yuen Long Center Shopping Center to become a new YOHO development. The renovation of YOHO Midtown mall started on October 15, 2013.

== Design ==
The mall was designed by AGC Design. Part of its design was inspired by Tokyo Midtown as it uses similar materials such as grey mirrors and timber columns. Its atrium space includes four shops with an 8-metre-tall (26 ft) ceiling providing generous retail estate, however the shopping mall lacks seating areas for customers and visitors.

== Structure ==
=== Phase I ===
Phase 1's area is 60 million square feet and has around 200 shops. It was hoped that there will be 150000 visitors to Phase I each day. Phase I has 1,500 parking spaces in its parking lot. The parking lot has six entrances.

A cinema opened in Yoho Mall I in July 2017.

=== Phase II ===
Phase II was originally Sun Yuen Long Centre, completed in 1994. It has an area of 280,000 square feet and four floors (excluding basement). Phase II mainly has shops which sells fashion for women, cosmetics, accessories, sports equipment, and electronics as well as travel agencies.

== Public area and facilities ==
YOHO Midtown has a 50,000 square feet green area called Midtown Garden. The 1st floor of the mall has an access passage to phase 1 and 3 and it is open for 24 hours.

== Controversy ==
The external wall of YOHO MALL uses light-emitting diode which are turned on at night. Yuen Long residents have complained that this causes light pollution.

== Gallery ==
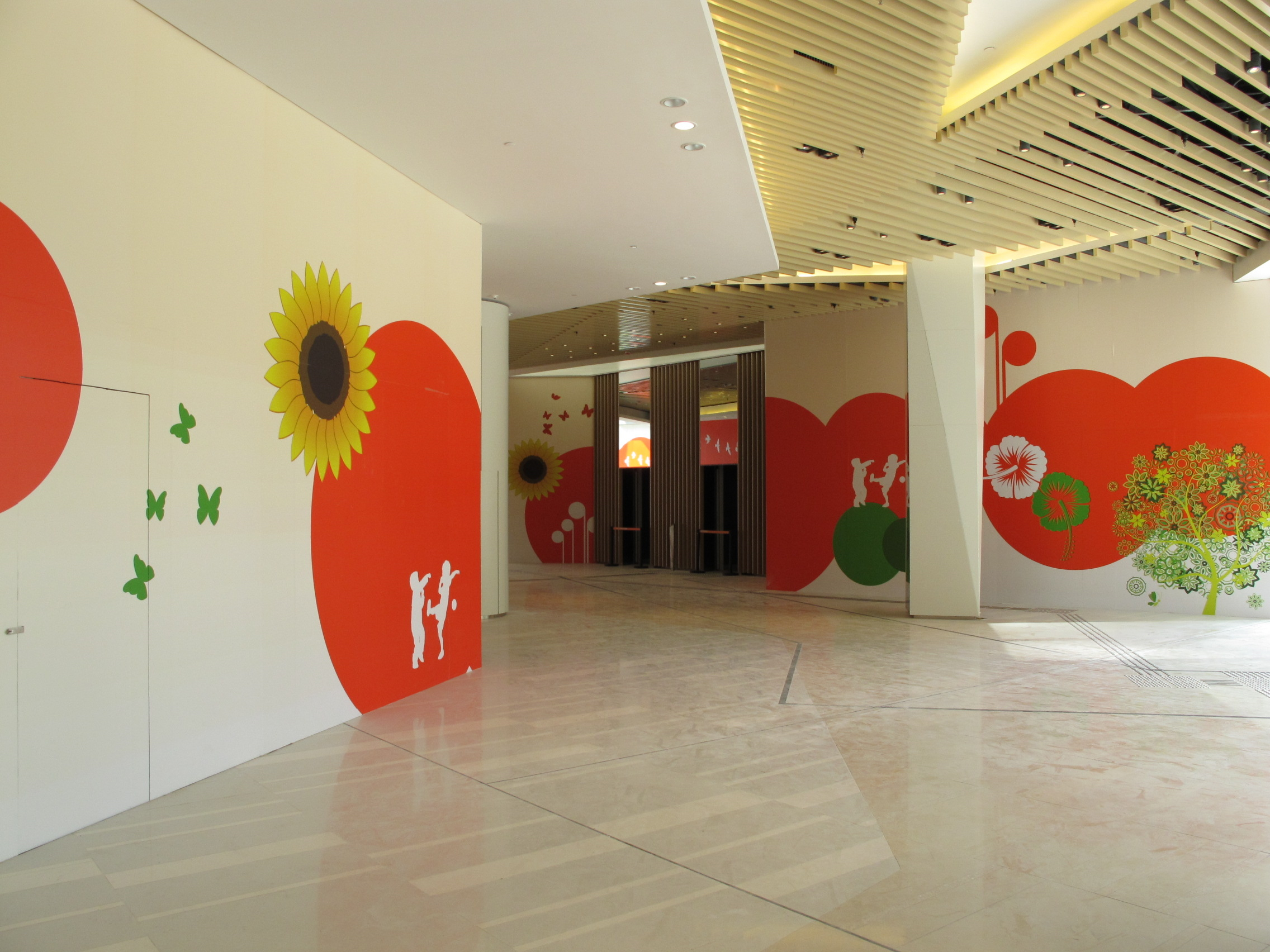
The restaurants on GF were still unopened in 2010.

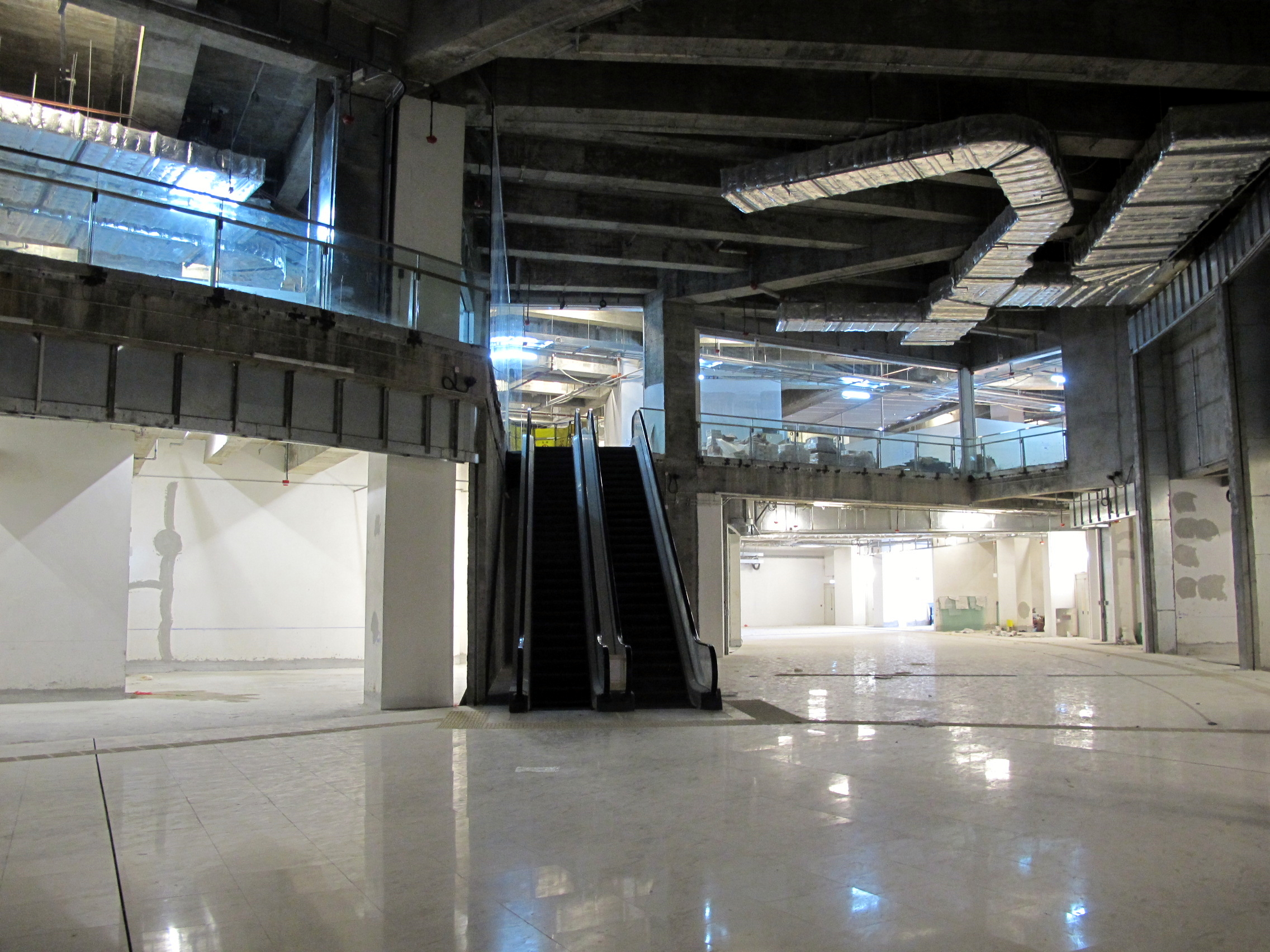
The atrium was under renovation in 2010.

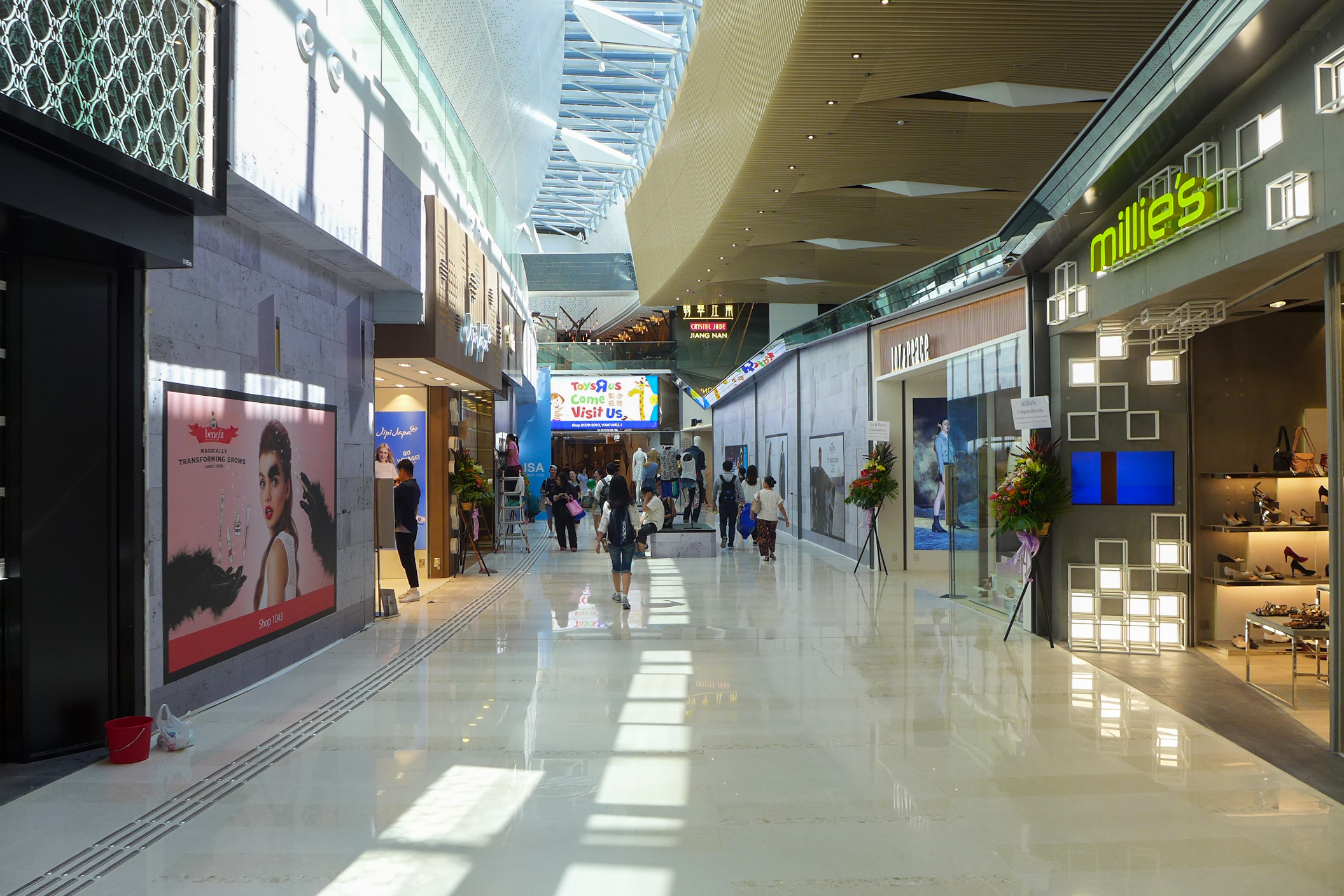
The shops on bridge

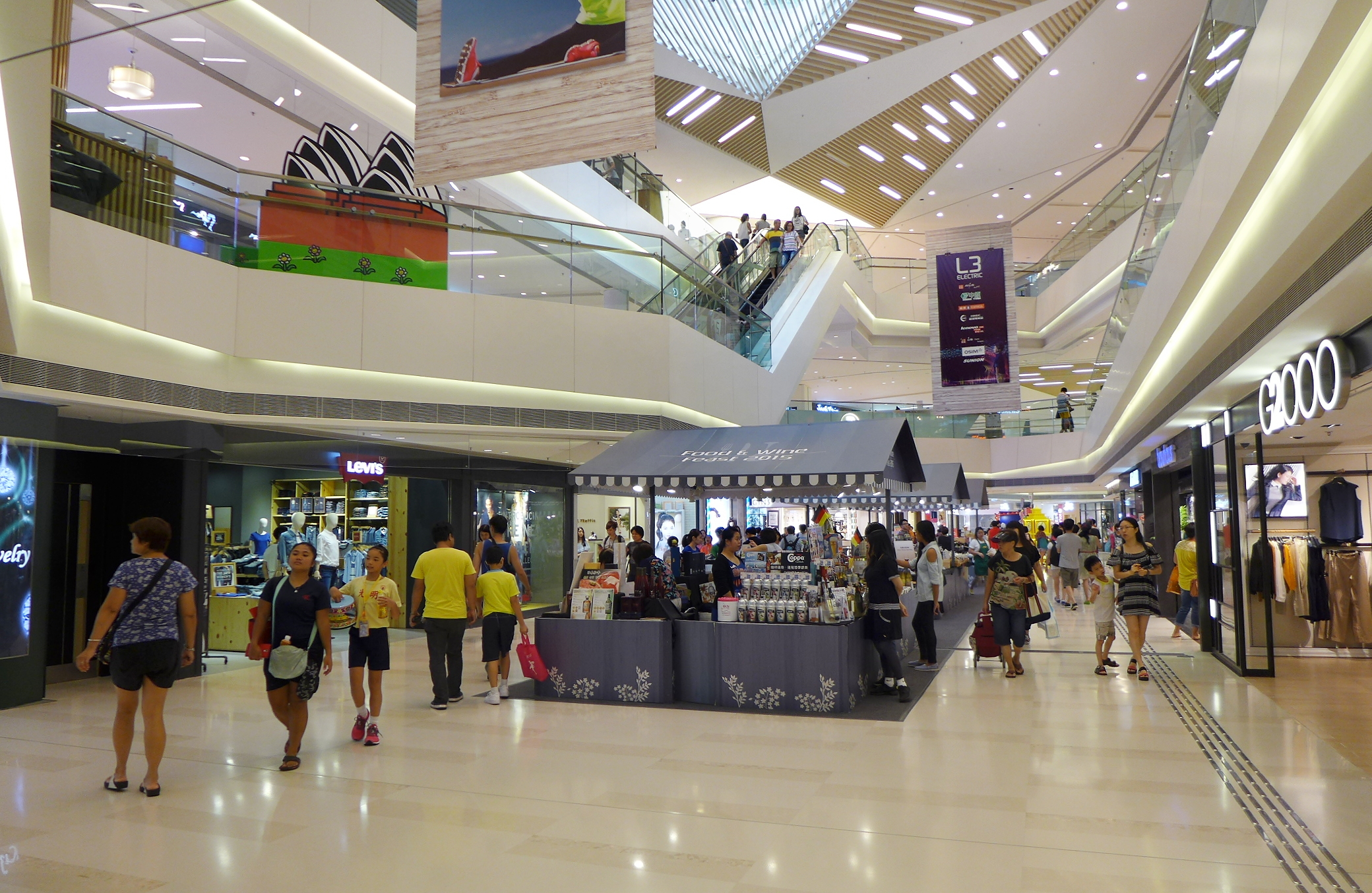
Yoho Mall II Atrium after renovation in 2015

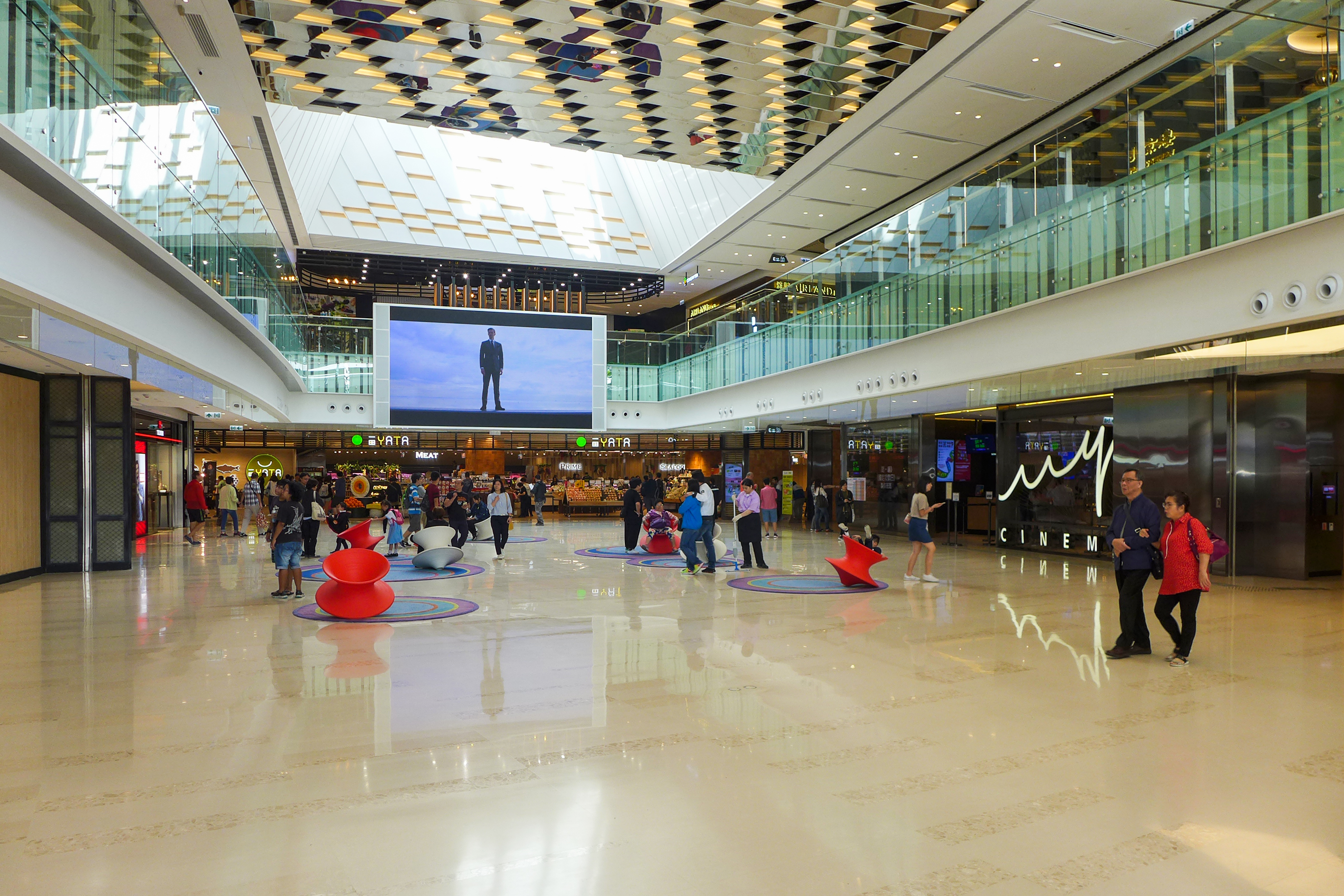
Atrium in Yoho Mall Extension

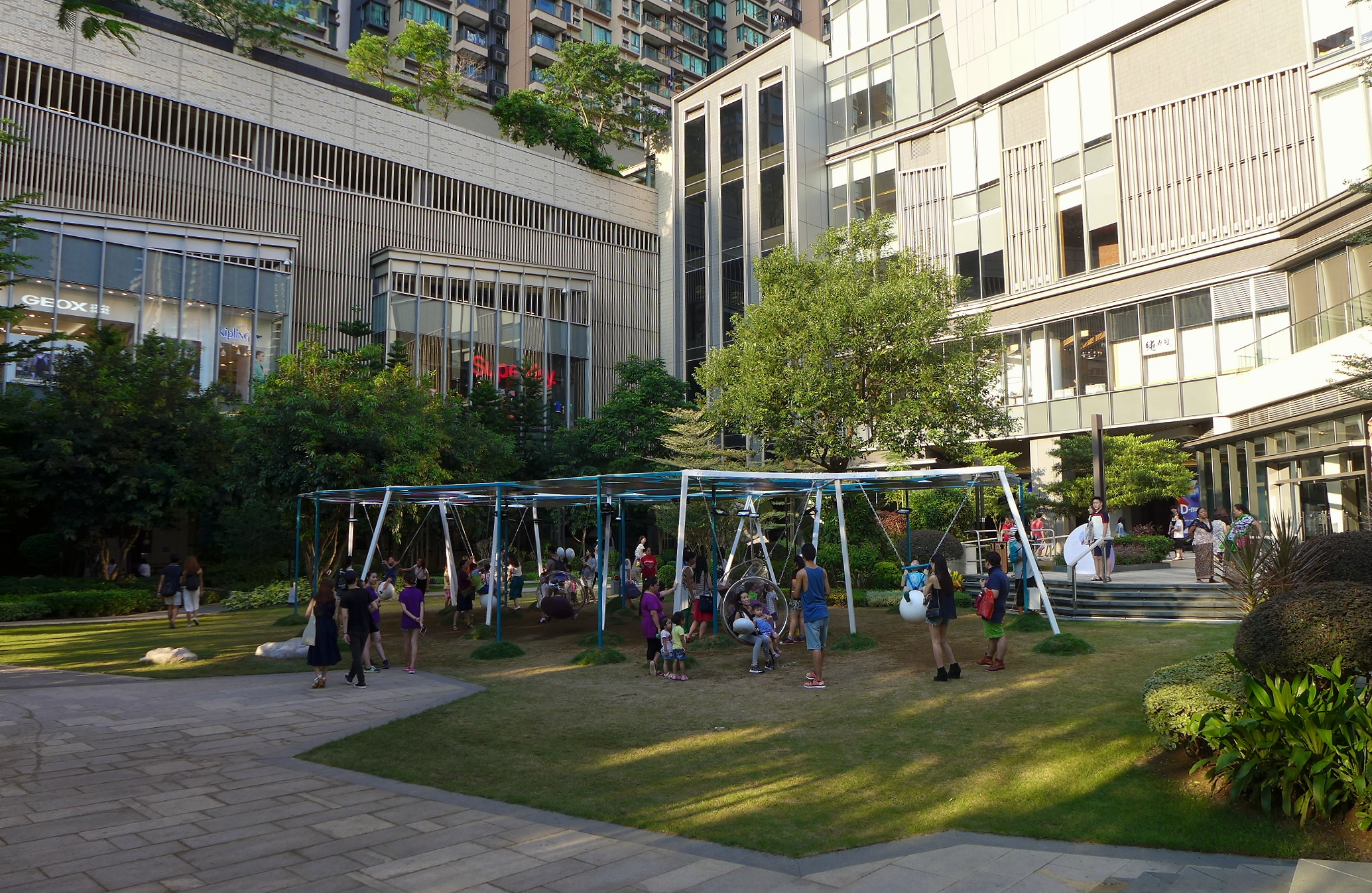
Mall Midtown Garden in 2015
