= Tai Tong Road stop =

MTR station in New Territories, Hong Kong

Coordinates: 22°26′40″N 114°01′48″E

Tai Tong Road 大棠路
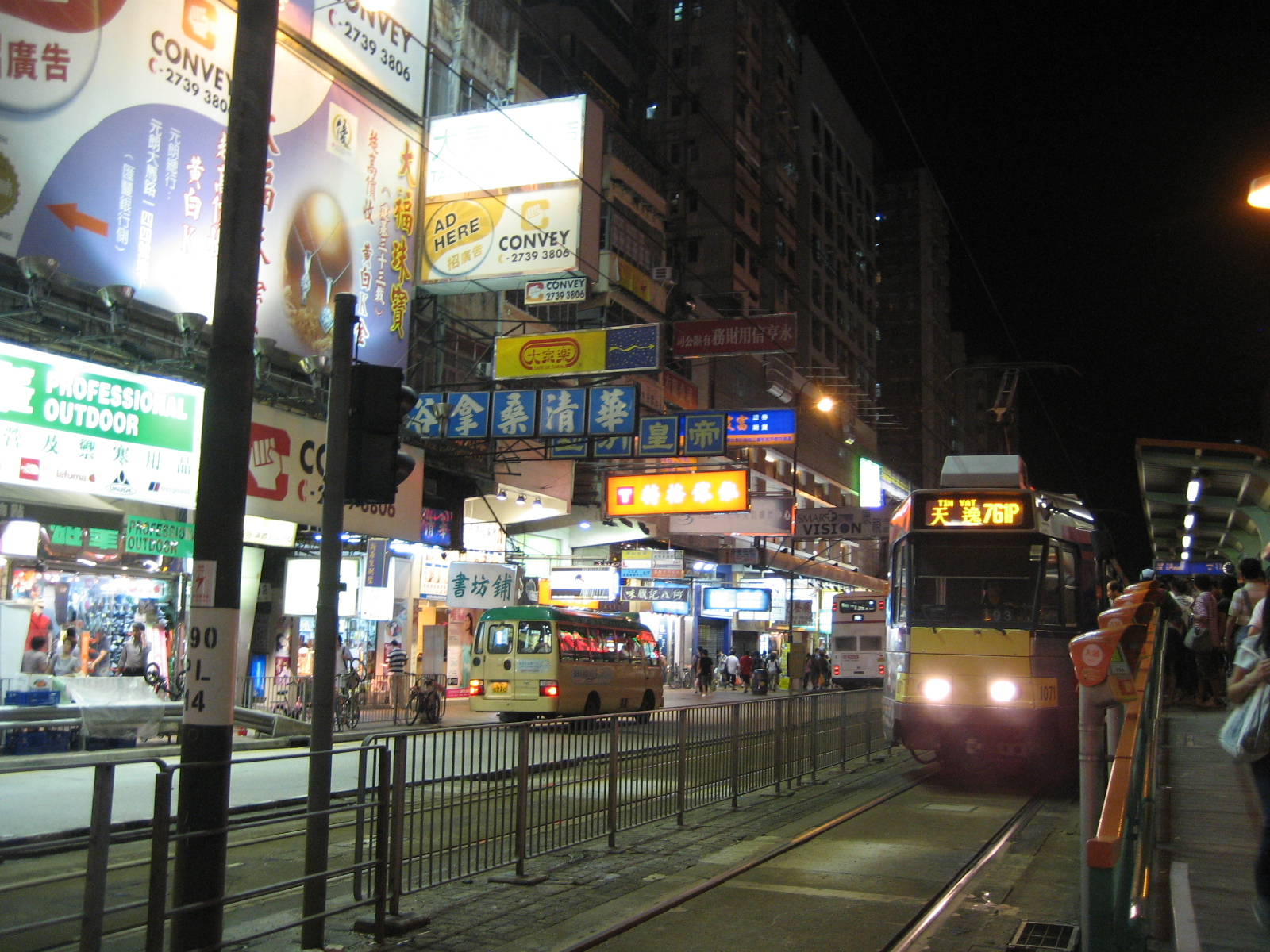
- Tai Tong Road stop at night

General information
- Location: Tai Tong Road; Yuen Long District; Hong Kong
- System: MTR Light Rail stop
- Owner: KCR Corporation
- Operator: MTR Corporation
- Line: 610 614 615 761P
- Platforms: 2 side platforms
- Tracks: 2
- Connections: Bus, minibus

Construction
- Structure type: At-grade
- Accessible: yes

Other information
- Station code: TTR (English code); 590 (Digital code)
- Fare zone: 5

History
- Opened: 18 September 1988; 37 years ago

Services
Preceding stop	MTR Light Rail	Following stop
Hong Lok Road towards Tuen Mun Ferry Pier	610	Yuen Long Terminus
Hong Lok Road towards Tuen Mun Ferry Pier	614	Yuen Long Terminus
Hong Lok Road towards Tuen Mun Ferry Pier	615	Yuen Long Terminus
Hong Lok Road towards Tin Yat	761P	Yuen Long Terminus
Location
- Location within MTR

Tai Tong Road (Chinese: 大棠路) is an at-grade MTR Light Rail stop located at the junction of Castle Peak Road and Tai Tong Road in Yuen Long District. It began service on 18 September 1988 and belongs to Zone 5. This stop used to be known as "大棠道" in Chinese but it was renamed to "大棠路" on 13 June 2010; its English name remains unchanged.

The stop has many shops and office buildings found here, giving the nickname Causeway Bay of the New Territories.
