= Long Ping station =

MTR station in the New Territories, Hong Kong

Long Ping 朗屏/朗屛
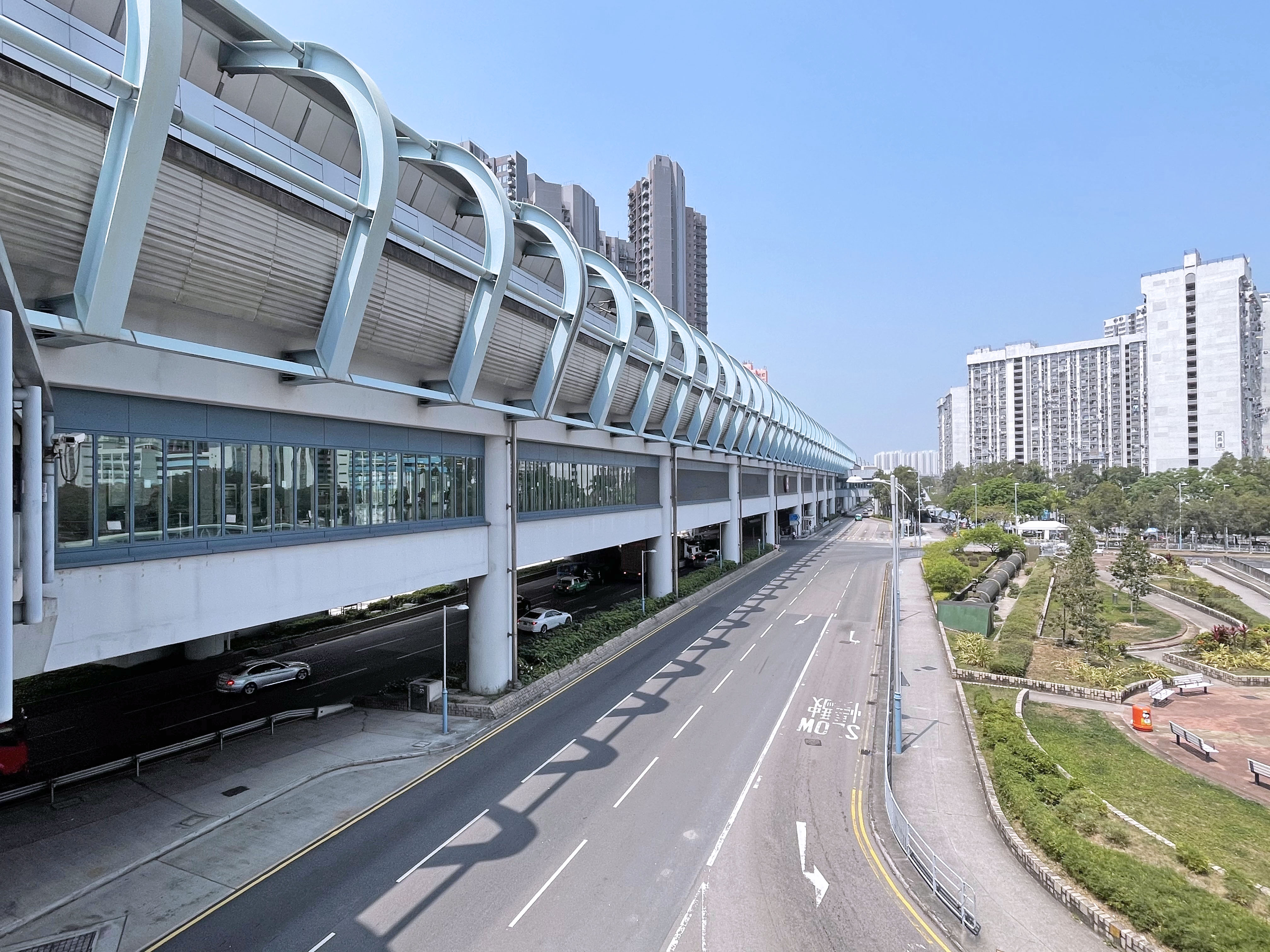
- Exterior of Long Ping station

Chinese name
- Chinese: 朗屏
- Literal meaning: Light discard(ing)
Transcriptions
Standard Mandarin
- Hanyu Pinyin: Lǎngpíng
Yue: Cantonese
- Yale Romanization: Lóhngpìng
- Jyutping: Long5ping4

General information
- Location: Wang Lok Street & Long Yip Street, Yuen Long; Yuen Long District, Hong Kong
- Coordinates: 22°26′52″N 114°01′31″E
- System: MTR rapid transit station
- Owner: KCR Corporation
- Operator: MTR Corporation
- Line: Tuen Ma line
- Platforms: 2 (1 island platform)
- Tracks: 2
- Connections: Bus, public light bus

Construction
- Structure type: Elevated
- Platform levels: 1
- Accessible: Yes
- Architect: Rocco Design Architects

Other information
- Station code: LOP

History
- Opened: 20 December 2003; 22 years ago

Services
Preceding station	MTR	Following station
Tin Shui Wai towards Tuen Mun	Tuen Ma line	Yuen Long towards Wu Kai Sha
Track layout
Location
- Location within MTR

Long Ping (Chinese: 朗屏) is an MTR Tuen Ma line station located in the northern part of Yuen Long Town to the southeast of Long Ping Estate, in the New Territories of Hong Kong. The station is elevated over Yuen Long Nullah.

There are two public transport interchanges on the northeast and south sides of the station. There is also cycle parking nearby. A network of footbridges connects the station to Long Ping Estate, Yuen Long Plaza and other nearby housing estates.

== History ==
Long Ping and Yuen Long stations were built under a combined contract, numbered CC-202, which was awarded to the AMEC-Hong Kong Construction Joint Venture. The contract, worth HK$1.76 billion, commenced in September 1999. A topping-out ceremony for both stations was held on 24 May 2002.

The station opened on 20 December 2003 with the inauguration of the West Rail.

On 27 June 2021, the KCR West Rail line officially merged with the Ma On Shan line (which was already extended into the Tuen Ma line Phase 1 at the time) in East Kowloon to form the new Tuen Ma line, as part of the Shatin to Central link project. Hence, Long Ping was included in the project and is now an intermediate station on the Tuen Ma line.

== Station layout ==
U2; Platforms	Platform 2	Tuen Ma line towards Wu Kai Sha (Yuen Long) →
U2; Platforms	Island platform, doors open on the right
U2; Platforms	Platform 1	← Tuen Ma line towards Tuen Mun (Tin Shui Wai)
C/U1	Concourse	Exits, footbridge
C/U1	Concourse	Customer services, toilets
C/U1	Concourse	MTR Shops, ticket machines, ATMs
G	Ground level	Exits, public transport interchanges

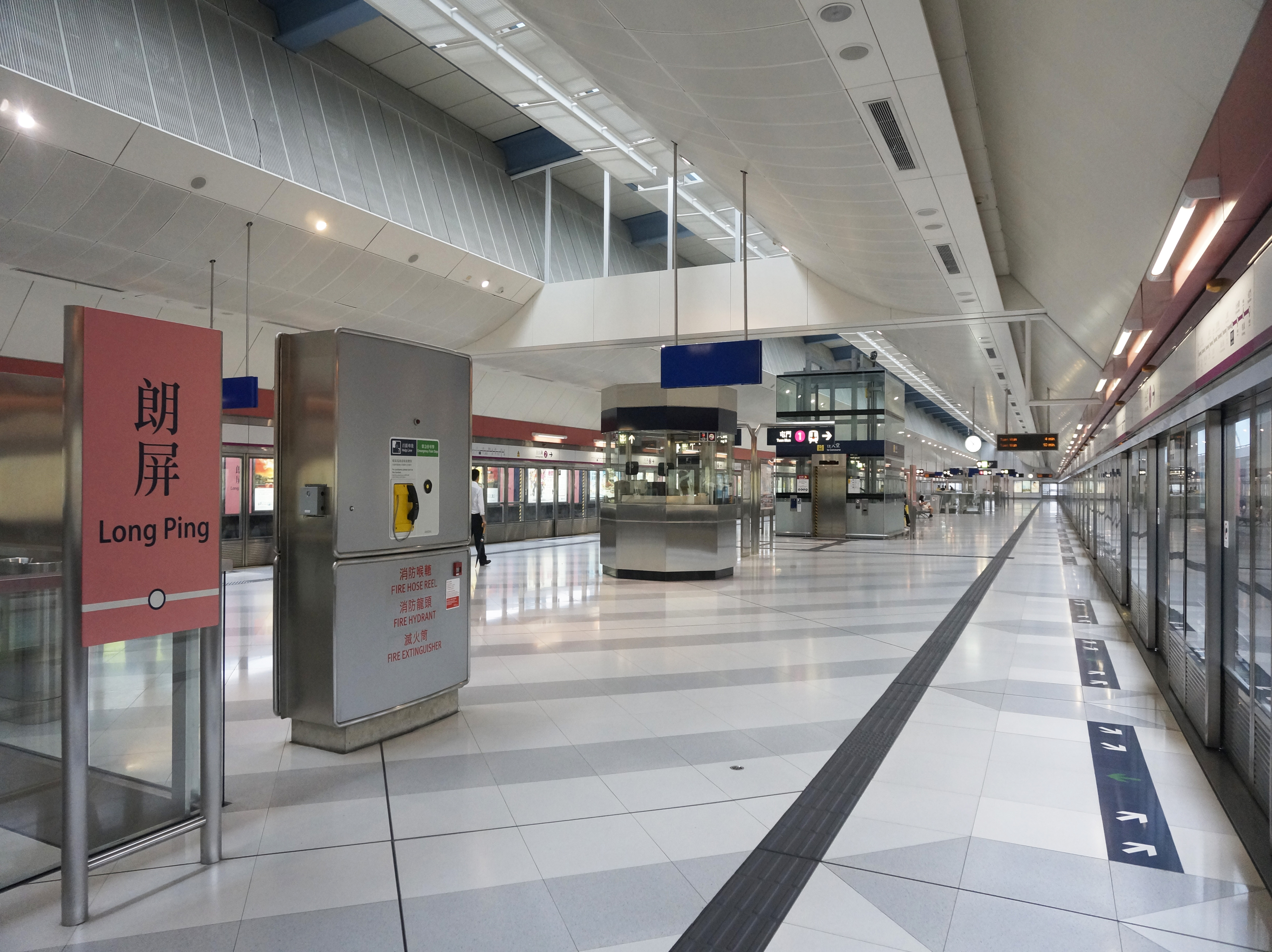
Long Ping Station platform (2013)

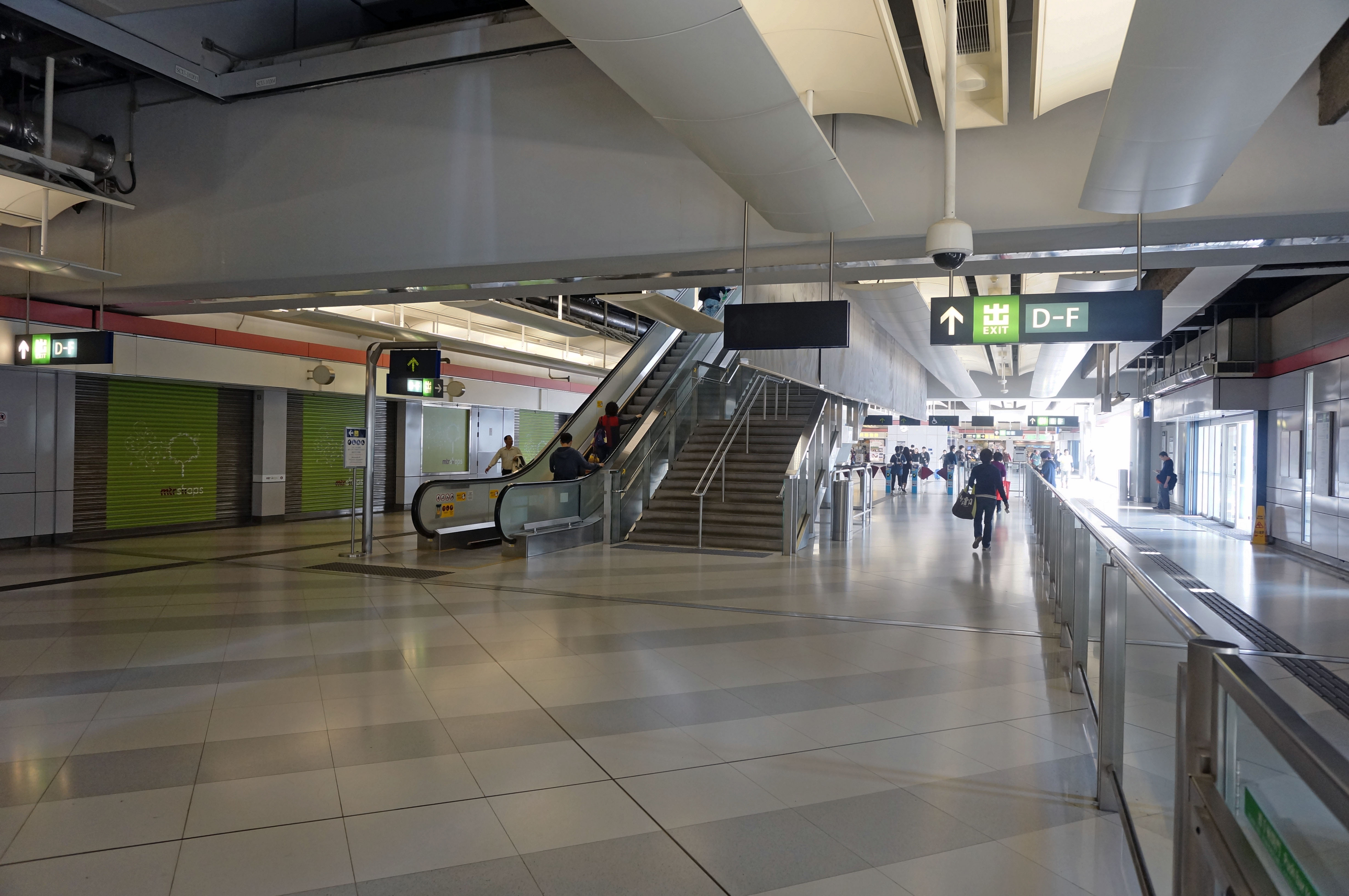
Long Ping Station Concourse (2017)

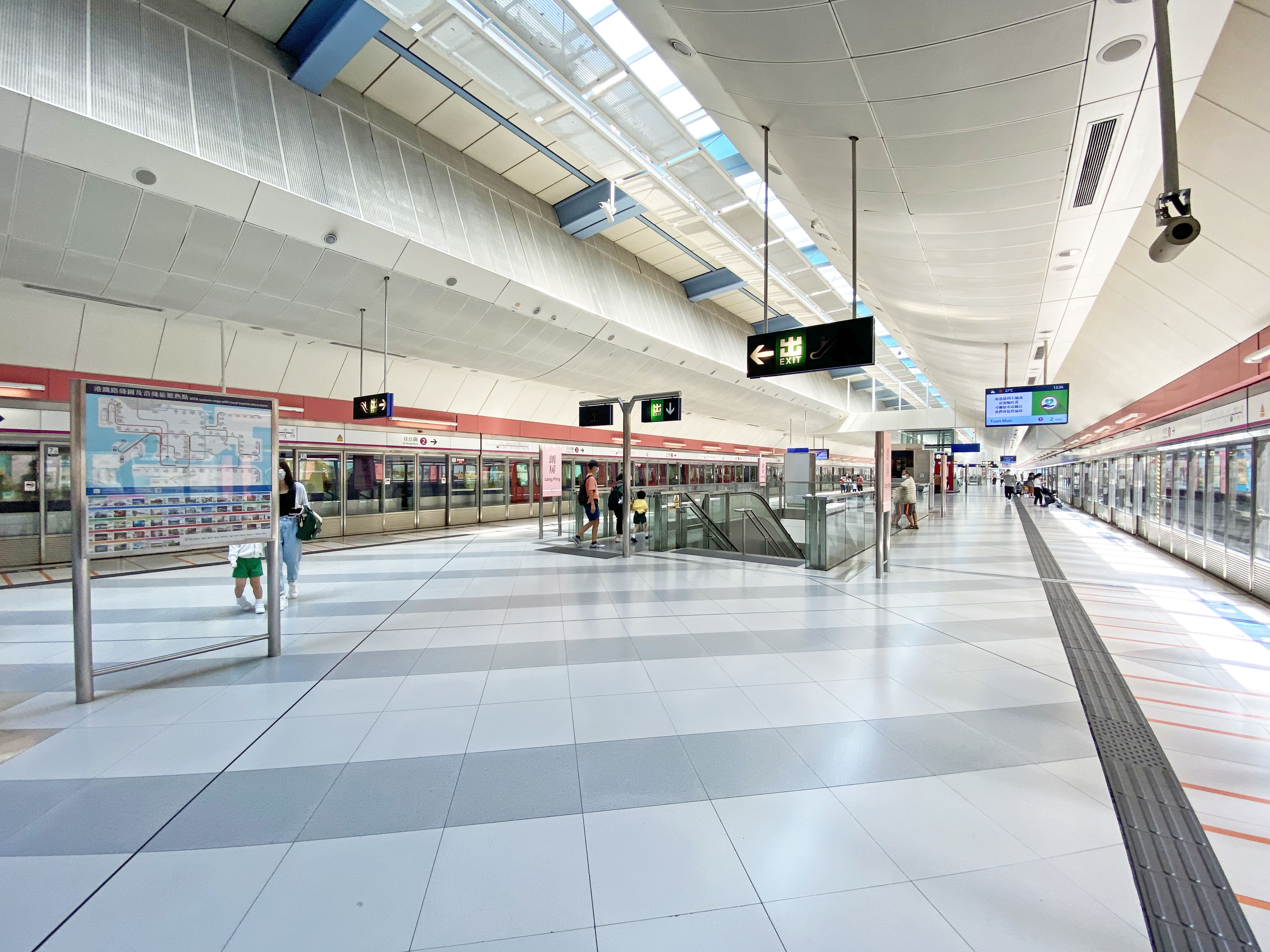
Station platforms (2020)

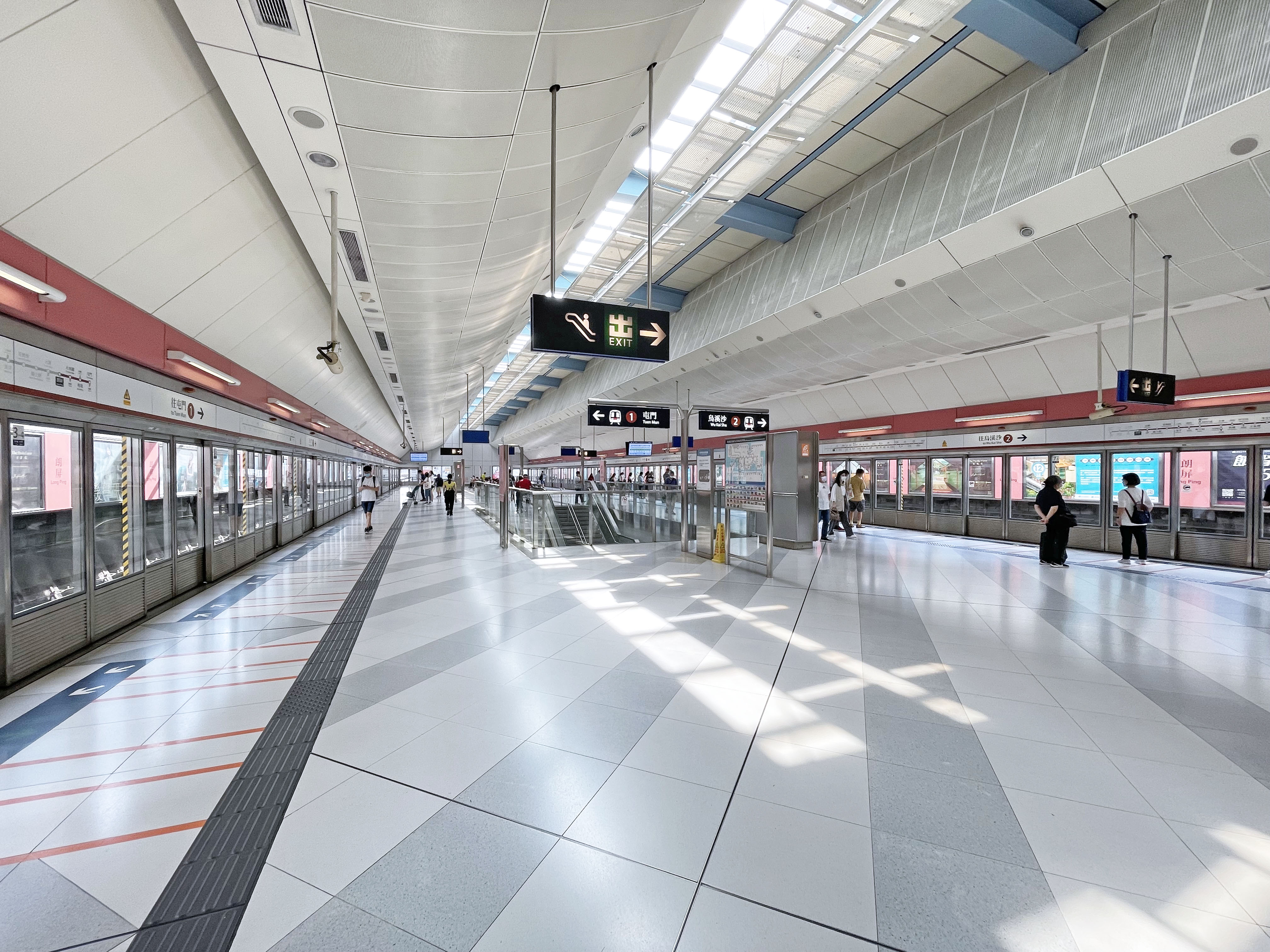
Station platforms (2021)

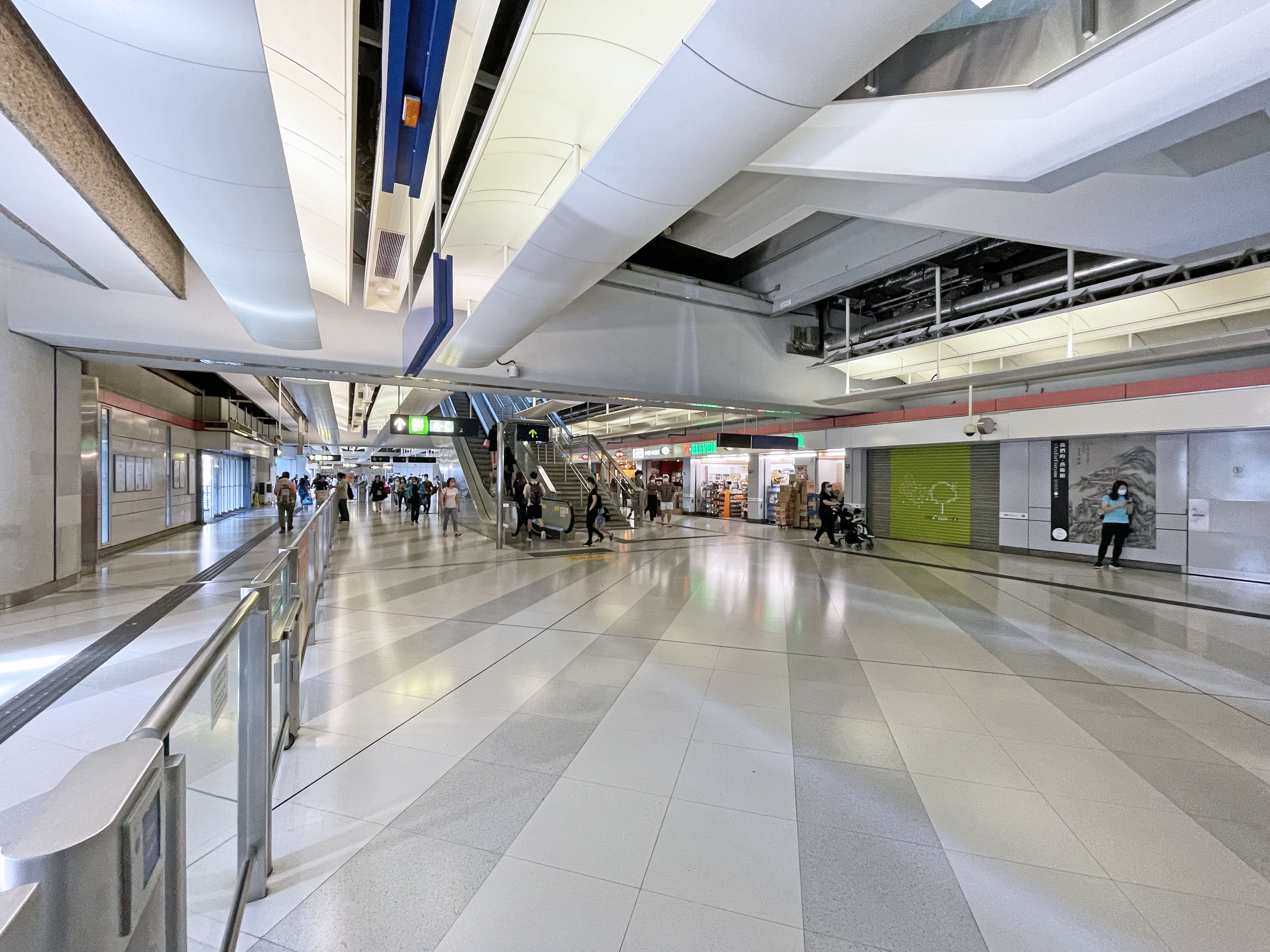
Concourse (2021)

Platforms 1 and 2 share the same island platform.

== Entrances/exits ==
- A: Wang Lok Street
- B1: Ping Shun Street
- B2: Long Ping Estate
- C: Po Lok Square
- D: Po Fai Path
- E: Tai Kiu Tsuen
- F: Tung Tau Industrial Area, Yue Fung Industrial Building
