= Yuen Long stop =

MTR Light Rail stop in Hong Kong

Coordinates: 22.446225°N 114.035913°E

Yuen Long 元朗
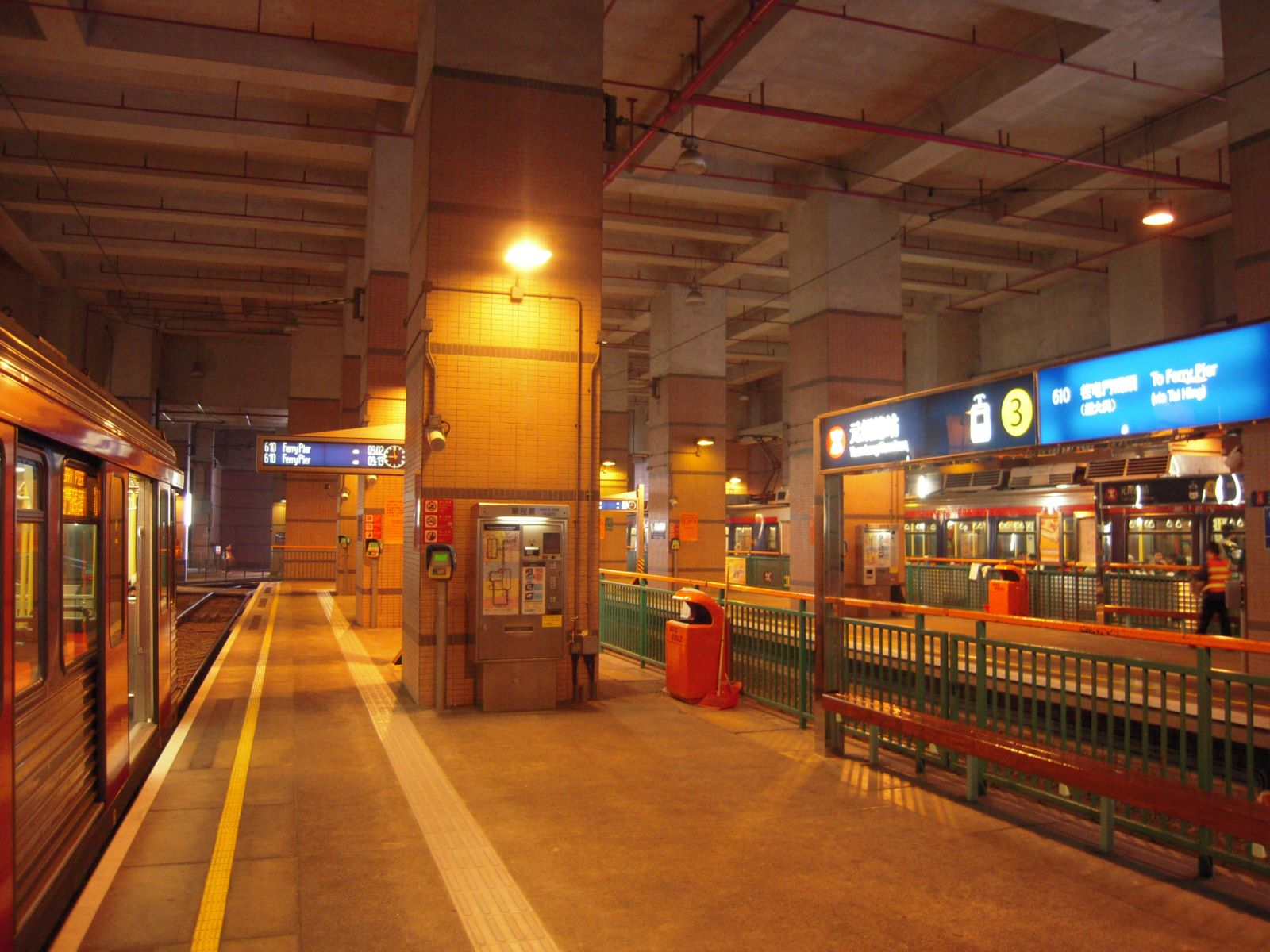
- Yuen Long stop platform

General information
- Location: Yuen Long Town; Yuen Long District; Hong Kong
- System: MTR Light Rail stop
- Owner: KCR Corporation
- Operator: MTR Corporation
- Line: 610 614 615 761P
- Platforms: 5 side platforms
- Tracks: 5
- Connections: Tuen Ma line ( Yuen Long); Bus, minibus

Construction
- Structure type: At-grade
- Accessible: yes

Other information
- Station code: YLL (English code); 600 (Digital code)
- Fare zone: Zone 5

History
- Opened: 18 September 1988; 37 years ago

Services
Preceding stop	MTR Light Rail	Following stop
Tai Tong Road towards Tuen Mun Ferry Pier	610	Terminus
Tai Tong Road towards Tuen Mun Ferry Pier	614	Terminus
Tai Tong Road towards Tuen Mun Ferry Pier	615	Terminus
Tai Tong Road towards Tin Yat	761P	Terminus
Preceding station	MTR	Following station
Long Ping towards Tuen Mun	Tuen Ma line	Kam Sheung Road towards Wu Kai Sha
Location
- Location within MTR

Yuen Long (Chinese: 元朗) is an MTR Light Rail stop in Hong Kong. It is located at ground level underneath Sun Yuen Long Centre in Yuen Long District of the New Territories, and is the northeasternmost Light Rail stop. It is connected to Yuen Long station on the Tuen Ma line.

== Station layout ==
-	Overlying Properties	Sun Yuen Long Centre
Platforms (Ground)	Exit	Tuen Ma line (Yuen Long Station), Light Rail Customer Service Centre
Platforms (Ground)	Exit	Yuen Long Station Public Transport Interchange, Yuen Long (East) Bus Terminus
Platforms (Ground)	Platform 1	Terminus for Routes: 610 614 615 761P
Platforms (Ground)	Platform 2	Route 610 towards Tuen Mun Ferry Pier
Platforms (Ground)	Platform 3	Route 614 towards Tuen Mun Ferry Pier
Platforms (Ground)	Platform 4	Route 615 towards Tuen Mun Ferry Pier
Platforms (Ground)	Platform 5	Route 761P towards Tin Yat
