= Results breakdown of the 2011 Hong Kong local elections =

2011 Hong Kong local elections
- 6 November 2011
- Turnout: 41.49% ▲
Party	Leader	Vote %	Seats	+/–
DAB	Tam Yiu-chung	23.89%	136	+16
Democratic	Albert Ho	17.42%	47	−3
ADPL	Bruce Liu	3.85%	15	−2
Civil Force	Ho Hau-cheung	2.98%	15	−3
FTU	Cheng Yiu-tong	3.10%	11	+7
Liberal	Miriam Lau	1.98%	9	+3
Neo Democrats	Gary Fan & others	2.15%	8	0
Civic	Alan Leong	4.03%	7	−5
NWSC	Leung Yiu-chung	1.22%	5	+2
NPP	Regina Ip	1.32%	4	+3
This lists parties that won seats. See the complete results below.

This is the results breakdown of the Hong Kong district council elections, 2011. The results are generated from the Registration and Electoral Office website and 1to 99.org.

== Result overview ==
=== Central and Western ===
Code	Constituency	Incumbent	Pro-democracy Candidate(s)	Pro-Beijing Candidate(s)	Other Candidate(s)	Results
A01	Chung Wan	Yuen Bun-keung (DP)	Hui Chi-fung (DP); So Ho (PP/PV)	Wai Pui-shuen (Ind)		Democratic hold
A02	Mid Levels East	Jackie Cheung Yick-hung (Ind)	Wilhelm Tang Wai-chung (DP)	Jackie Cheung Yick-hung (Ind)	Chan Pui-yi (Ind)	Independent hold
A03	Castle Road	Cheng Lai-king (DP)	Cheng Lai-king (DP)		Pak Fu-hung (Ind)	Democratic hold
A04	Peak	Tanya Chan (Civ)	Tanya Chan (Civ)	Joseph Chan Ho-lim (LP)		Liberal gain from Civic
A05	University	Chan Chit-kwai (Ind)	Tsui Kit-sang (LSD)	Chan Chit-kwai (Ind)		Independent hold
A06	Kennedy Town & Mount Davis	Chan Hok-fung (DAB)	Bonnie Ng Hoi-yan (DP)	Chan Hok-fung (DAB)		DAB hold
A07	Kwun Lung	Ip Kwok-him (DAB)	Leung Kwok-hung (LSD)	Ip Kwok-him (DAB)		DAB hold
A08	Sai Wan	Chan Tak-chor (Ind)	Winfield Chong Wing-fai (DP)	Cheung Kwok-kwan (DAB)		DAB gain from Independent
A09	Belcher	Yeung Sui-yin (DP)	Yeung Sui-yin (DP); William Wong Ka-lok (PP/PV)	Malcolm Lam Wai-wing (Ind)		Independent gain from Democratic
A10	Shek Tong Tsui	Chan Choi-hi (Ind)	Ching Ming-tat (Ind)	Chan Choi-hi (Ind)		Independent hold
A11	Sai Ying Pun	Lo Yee-hang (DAB)	Yong Chak-cheong (DP); Yuen Man-ho (PP/PV)	Lo Yee-hang (DAB)		DAB hold
A12	Sheung Wan	Kam Nai-wai (DP)	Kam Nai-wai (DP); Yim Tat-ming (PP/PV)		Chan Yin-ho (Ind)	Democratic hold
A13	Tung Wah	Frederick Ho Chun-ki (DP)	Frederick Ho Chun-ki (DP); Lee Siu-cheong (PP/PV)	Siu Ka-yi (DAB)		DAB gain from Democratic
A14	Centre Street	Sidney Lee Chi-hang (Ind)	Wong Ho-yin (LJL)	Sidney Lee Chi-hang (Ind)		Independent hold
A15	Water Street	Wong Kin-shing (DP)	Wong Kin-shing (DP); Leslie Spencer Tai Cheuk-yin (Ind)	Yeung Hok-ming (DAB)		Democratic hold

=== Wan Chai ===
Code	Constituency	Incumbent	Pro-democracy Candidate(s)	Pro-Beijing Candidate(s)	Other Candidate(s)	Results
B01	Hennessy	Cheng Ki-kin (Ind)	Cheng Ki-kin (Ind)		Catherine Wong Kit-ning (Ind)	Independent hold
B02	Oi Kwan	Anna Tang King-yung (DAB)	Li Kin-yin (DP)	Anna Tang King-yung (DAB)		DAB hold
B03	Canal Road	Jacqueline Chung Ka-man (DAB)		Jacqueline Chung Ka-man (DAB)		DAB uncontested
B04	Causeway Bay	Yolanda Ng Yuen-ting (Ind)	Fong Yik-lam (DP); Kong Kwok-chu (PP)	Yolanda Ng Yuen-ting (Ind)		Independent hold
B05	Tai Hang	Wong Chor-fung (NPP)	Sin Chung-kai (DP); Christopher Lau Gar-hung (PP/PV)	Wong Chor-fung (NPP)	Richard Shum See-hoi (Ind)	NPP hold
B06	Jardine's Lookout	David Lai (Ind)	David Lai (Ind)	Lee Ian-eon (LP)	Lee Chak-man (Ind)	Independent hold
B07	Broadwood	Michael Mak Kwok-fung (LSD)	Michael Mak Kwok-fung (LSD)		Pamela Peck Wan-kam (Ind)	Independent gain from LSD
B08	Happy Valley	Ng Kam-chun (Ind)	Tsang Kin-chiu (Civ)	Ng Kam-chun (Ind)		Independent hold
B09	Stubbs Road	Wong Wang-tai (Ind)	Ng Yin-keung (Civ)	Wong Wang-tai (Ind)		Independent hold
B10	Southorn	Lee Pik-yee (Ind)	Chung Chor-kit (PD)	Lee Pik-yee (Ind)		Independent hold
B11	Tai Fat Hau	Kenny Lee Kwun-yee (DAB)	Lo Kin-ming (PD)	Kenny Lee Kwun-yee (DAB)		DAB hold

=== Eastern ===
Code	Constituency	Incumbent	Pro-democracy Candidate(s)	Pro-Beijing Candidate(s)	Other Candidate(s)	Results
C01	Tai Koo Shing West	Andrew Chiu Ka-yin (DP)	Andrew Chiu Ka-yin (DP)	Ang Kai-teng (NPP)		Democratic hold
C02	Tai Koo Shing East	Tso Hon-kwong (Ind)	Tso Hon-kwong (Ind)	Tse Tsz-kei (NPP)		NPP gain from Independent
C03	Lei King Wan	Alexander Fu Yuen-cheung (Ind)	Yim Ka-ming (DP)	Alexander Fu Yuen-cheung (Ind)		Independent hold
C04	Aldrich Bay	Ngan Chun-lim (DAB)		Ngan Chun-lim (DAB)		DAB uncontested
C05	Shaukeiwan	Lo Tip-chun (DAB)	Chung Shek-yan (LSD)	Lo Tip-chun (DAB)		DAB hold
C06	A Kung Ngam	Daniel To Boon-man (Ind)			Daniel To Boon-man (Ind); Georage Lam Kei-tung (Ind); Cheng Hing (Ind)	Independent hold
C07	Heng Fa Chuen	Manuel Chan Tim-shing (Ind)	Manuel Chan Tim-shing (Ind)	Stanley Ho Ngai-kam (FTU)		FTU gain from Independent
C08	Tsui Wan	Ku Kwai-yiu (LSD)	Ku Kwai-yiu (LSD)	Kwan Shui-lung (DAB)		DAB gain from LSD
C09	Yan Lam	Wong Kin-hing (Ind)	Cupid Leung Chun-kin (DP)	Wong Kin-hing (Ind)		Independent hold
C10	Siu Sai Wan	Chan Oi-kwan (DAB/FTU)		Chan Oi-kwan (DAB/FTU)		DAB/FTU uncontested
C11	King Yee	David Leung Kwok-hung (DAB/FTU)	Chan Yiu-tak (DP)	David Leung Kwok-hung (DAB/FTU)	Yeung Hon-sing (Ind)	DAB/FTU hold
C12	Wan Tsui	Kung Pak-cheung (DAB)		Kung Pak-cheung (DAB)		DAB uncontested
C13	Fei Tsui	Joseph Lai Chi-keong (Civ)	Joseph Lai Chi-keong (Civ)	Chao Shing-kie (DAB)		Civic hold
C14	Mount Parker	Wong Kin-pan (DAB)		Wong Kin-pan (DAB)		DAB uncontested
C15	Braemar Hill	Shiu Ka-fai (LP)		Shiu Ka-fai (LP)		Liberal uncontested
C16	Tin Hau	Joey Lee Man-lung (Ind)	Chan Kin-kwok (DP)	Joey Lee Man-lung (Ind)		Independent hold
C17	Fortress Hill	Frankie Lo Wing-kwan (Ind)		Frankie Lo Wing-kwan (Ind)		Independent uncontested
C18	Victoria Park	Jennifer Chow Kit-bing (Ind)		Jennifer Chow Kit-bing (Ind)		Independent uncontested
C19	City Garden	Hui Ching-on (Ind)	Hung Pak-cheung (Civ)	Hui Ching-on (Ind)		Independent hold
C20	Provident	Kwok Wai-keung (FTU/DAB)		Kwok Wai-keung (FTU/DAB)		FTU/DAB uncontested
C21	Fort Street	Hung Lin-cham (DAB)		Hung Lin-cham (DAB)		DAB uncontested
C22	Kam Ping	Choy So-yuk (DAB)		Choy So-yuk (DAB)		DAB uncontested
C23	Tanner	Desmond Lee Yu-tai (Ind)	Desmond Lee Yu-tai (Ind)		Kay Yim Fung-chi (Ind); Wong Shing-kwong (Ind)	Independent hold
C24	Healthy Village	Cheng Chi-sing (DAB)		Cheng Chi-sing (DAB)		DAB uncontested
C25	Quarry Bay	Eddie Ting Kong-ho (DAB)		Eddie Ting Kong-ho (DAB)		DAB uncontested
C26	Nam Fung	Leung Suk-ching (DP)	Leung Suk-ching (DP); Fok Wing-yi (LSD)		Ng Lai-ching (Ind)	Democratic hold
C27	Kornhill	Chan Kai-yuen (Civ)	Chan Kai-yuen (Civ)	Wong King (Ind)		Civic hold
C28	Kornhill Garden	Leung Siu-sun (Civ)	Leung Siu-sun (Civ)	Rhoda Liu Mei-ling (Ind)	Hung Hin-tim (Ind)	Civic hold
C29	Hing Tung	Wong Yuet-mui (Ind)	Lai Pui-sang (LSD)	Hui Lam-hing (Ind); Wong Tak-shing (Ind); Wong Yuet-mui (Ind)	Hung Chi-kit (Ind)	Independent gain from Independent
C30	Sai Wan Ho	Kong Chack-ho (Ind)	John Chan Hin-chung (Ind)	Kong Chack-ho (Ind)		Independent hold
C31	Lower Yiu Tung	Hui Ka-hoo (DAB)	Ng Kam-wai (DP)	Hui Ka-hoo (DAB)		DAB hold
C32	Upper Yiu Tung	Chiu Chi-keong (FTU/DAB)		Chiu Chi-keong (FTU/DAB)		FTU/DAB uncontested
C33	Hing Man	Chao Shing-kie (DAB)	Ho Man-wing (LSD)	Lau Hing-yeung (DAB)		DAB hold
C34	Lok Hong	Tsang Kin-shing (LSD)	Tsang Kin-shing (LSD)	Li Chun-chau (Ind)	Lui Sin-yi (Ind)	Independent gain from LSD
C35	Tsui Tak	Lui Chi-man (Ind)	Lui Chi-man (Ind)	Lee Chun-keung (LP)		Liberal gain from Independent
C36	Yue Wan	Christopher Chung Shu-kun (DAB)		Christopher Chung Shu-kun (DAB)		DAB uncontested
C37	Kai Hiu	Lam Chui-lin (Ind)		Lam Chui-lin (Ind)	Ng Mei-yung (Ind); Joseph Lau Hao-king (Ind); Leung Chi-wai (Ind)	Independent hold

=== Southern ===
Code	Constituency	Incumbent	Pro-democracy Candidate(s)	Pro-Beijing Candidate(s)	Other Candidate(s)	Results
D01	Aberdeen	Vincent Wong Lin-sun (Ind)		Vincent Wong Lin-sun (Ind)		Independent uncontested
D02	Ap Lei Chau Estate	Lam Yuk-chun (Ind)		Lam Yuk-chun (Ind)		Independent uncontested
D03	Ap Lei Chau North	Cheung Sik-yung (Ind)		Cheung Sik-yung (Ind)	Cheung Wing-ho (Ind)	Independent hold
D04	Lei Tung I	Cheung Siu-keung (Ind)	Au Nok-hin (DP); Chan Fung-wah (PP)	Cheung Siu-keung (Ind)		Democratic gain from Independent
D05	Lei Tung II	Wong Che-ngai (Ind)	Lo Kin-hei (DP); Lo Chung-man (PP)	Wong Che-ngai (Ind)		Democratic gain from Independent
D06	South Horizons East	Lam Kai-fai (Ind)	Kwok Wing-hang (Civ)	Lam Kai-fai (Ind)		Independent hold
D07	South Horizons West	Fung Wai-kwong (DP)	Fung Wai-kwong (DP); Anthony Lam Yue-yeung (PP/PV); Kwai Sze-kit (Ind)	Sze Chun-fai (NPP)		Democratic hold
D08	Wah Kwai	Ada Mak Tse How-ling (DAB)	Yeung Siu-pik (DP)	Ada Mak Tse How-ling (DAB)		DAB hold
D09	Wah Fu I	Au Lap-sing (Ind)	Li Shee-lin (DP)	Au Lap-sing (Ind)	Wong Wing-lit (Ind)	Independent hold
D10	Wah Fu II	Chai Man-hon (DP)	Chai Man-hon (DP)	Wong Choi-lap (DAB)		Democratic hold
D11	Pokfulam	Paulus Johannes Zimmerman (Civ)	Paulus Johannes Zimmerman (Civ)		Yim Kin-ping (Ind)	Civic hold
D12	Chi Fu	Chu Ching-hong (Ind)		Chu Ching-hong (Ind)		Independent uncontested
D13	Tin Wan	Chan Fu-ming (Ind)		Chan Fu-ming (Ind)		Independent uncontested
D14	Shek Yue	Mar Yuet-har (Ind)		Chu Lap-wai (DAB)	Zico Man Ho-keung (Ind)	DAB gain from Independent
D15	Wong Chuk Hang	Tsui Yuen-wa (DP)	Tsui Yuen-wa (DP)	Yuen Chi-kwong (DAB/FTU)		Democratic hold
D16	Bays Area	Fergus Fung Se-goun (LP)	Albert Lai Kwong-tak (Civ)	Fergus Fung Se-goun (LP)		Liberal hold
D17	Stanley & Shek O	Lee Pui-ying (Ind)		Lee Pui-ying (Ind); Wong Kam-chuen (LP)		Independent hold

=== Yau Tsim Mong ===
Code	Constituency	Incumbent	Pro-democracy Candidate(s)	Pro-Beijing Candidate(s)	Other Candidate(s)	Results
E01	Tsim Sha Tsui West	Hung Chiu-wah (DAB)	David Yam Siu-wai (Ind)	Hung Chiu-wah (DAB)		DAB hold
E02	Jordan East	Chris Ip Ngo-tung (DAB)	Alexis Chan Kin-shing (DP)	Chris Ip Ngo-tung (DAB)	Li King-wah (Ind); Simon Ho Ka-kuen (HKAA)	DAB hold
E03	Jordan West	Chan Siu-tong (DAB)	Sarah Kumar Limbu (SDA)	Chan Siu-tong (DAB)	Lam Yi-lai (HKAA)	DAB hold
E04	Yau Ma Tei	Yeung Tsz-hei (DAB)	Austen Ng Po-shan (ADPL)	Yeung Tsz-hei (DAB)		DAB hold
E05	Charming	Chung Kong-mo (DAB)	Yeung Ke-cheong (LSD)	Chung Kong-mo (DAB)		DAB hold
E06	Mong Kok West	Hui Tak-leung (Ind)	Foo Pui-man (Ind)	Hui Tak-leung (Ind); Lam Chun-sing (Ind)		Independent hold
E07	Fu Pak	Chan Wai-keung (Ind)		Chan Wai-keung (Ind)		Independent uncontested
E08	Olympic	New Seat	James To Kun-sun (DP); Alaric Bazanio Chu King-leung (PP)	Vincent Lau Kai-kit (LP)		Democratic gain new seat
E09	Cherry	Lam Ho-yeung (DP)	Lam Ho-yeung (DP); Yam Wing-keung (PP)	John Wong-chung (Ind)		Independent gain from Democratic
E10	Tai Kok Tsui South	Benjamin Choi Siu-fung (DAB/FTU)	Lee Wai-fung (DP); Tsang Chun-ying (LSD)	Benjamin Choi Siu-fung (DAB/FTU)		DAB/FTU hold
E11	Tai Kok Tsui North	Henry Chan Man-yu (Ind)	Wong Ka-ying (Civ); Chun Fei-pang (Ind)	Lau Pak-kei (DAB/FTU)	Poon Chuk-hung (Ind)	DAB/FTU gain from Independent
E12	Tai Nan	Francis Chong Wing-charn (Ind)	Henry Chan Man-yu (Ind); Avery Ng Man-yuen (LSD)	Francis Chong Wing-charn (Ind); Tam Kam-lin (FLU)		Independent hold
E13	Mong Kok North	Rowena Wong Shu-ming (Ind)	Ip Shu-on (Civ)	Rowena Wong Shu-ming (Ind)		Independent hold
E14	Mong Kok East	Law Wing-cheung (Ind)	Lau Chun-yip (DP); Yuen Chiu-tat (PP/TF); James Lung Wai-man (SDA)	Wong Kin-san (Ind)		Independent gain from Independent
E15	Mong Kok South	Chow Chun-fai (Ind)	Yuen Hoi-man (DP)	Chow Chun-fai (Ind)		Independent hold
E16	King's Park	Edward Leung Wai-kuen (Ind)	Lam Kin-man (ADPL)	Edward Leung Wai-kuen (Ind)	Lee Kwok-keung (TUC); Wong Shu-kau (Ind)	Independent hold
E17	Tsim Sha Tsui East	Kwan Sau-ling (DAB)	Harminder Singh (Civ); Liu Siu-fai (PP)	Kwan Sau-ling (DAB)	Monesh Gopaldas Ahuja (Ind); Hiro Kishinchand Hathiramni (Ind)	DAB hold

=== Sham Shui Po ===
Code	Constituency	Incumbent	Pro-democracy Candidate(s)	Pro-Beijing Candidate(s)	Other Candidate(s)	Results
F01	Po Lai	Leung Yau-fong (ADPL)	Leung Yau-fong (ADPL); Lau Tit-wai (PP)	So Chun-man (Ind)		ADPL hold
F02	Cheung Sha Wan	Aaron Lam Ka-fai (Ind)		Aaron Lam Ka-fai (Ind)		Independent uncontested
F03	Nam Cheong North	Vincent Cheng Wing-shun (DAB)	Leung Lai (ADPL); Lo Wai-yin (PP)	Vincent Cheng Wing-shun (DAB)		DAB hold
F04	Shek Kip Mei & Nam Cheong East	Tam Kwok-kiu (ADPL)	Tsung Po-shan (ADPL); Tsang Ting-hin (PP)	Law Kam-yau (Ind)		ADPL hold
F05	Nam Cheong South	Wong Kam-kuen (FLU)	Gordon Fong Ka-keung (CYRSC)	Lee Wing-man (FLU)		FLU hold
F06	Nam Cheong Central	Lau Puk-yuk (DAB)	Mak Wai-ming (Ind)	Lau Puk-yuk (DAB)		DAB hold
F07	Nam Cheong West	Wai Woon-nam (ADPL)	Wai Woon-nam (ADPL)	Chan Kin-man (FTU/DAB)		ADPL hold
F08	Fu Cheong	Tracy Lai Wai-lin (ADPL)	Tracy Lai Wai-lin (ADPL); Ip Chee-tak (PP)	Leung Man-kwong (FCERA)		Fu Cheong Estate RA gain from ADPL
F09	Lai Kok	Frederick Fung Kin-kee (ADPL)	Frederick Fung Kin-kee (ADPL); Chiu Chik-tung (PP)	Fan Kwok-fai (FTU/DAB)	Chung Wing-yuen (Ind)	ADPL hold
F10	Fortune	Chum Tak-shing (ADPL)	Chum Tak-shing (ADPL)	Leung Ming-yin (DAB)		ADPL hold
F11	Lai Chi Kok South	Wong Chi-yung (ADPL)	Wong Chi-yung (ADPL)	Leung Un-shing (DAB)		ADPL hold
F12	Mei Foo South	Joe Wong Tak-chuen (Civ)	Joe Wong Tak-chuen (Civ)	Wong Tat-tung (DAB)	Ken Chan Kin-chun (Ind)	DAB gain from Civic
F13	Mei Foo Central	Shum Siu-hung (Ind)	Ng Yuet-lan (Civ); Judey Tzeng Li-wen (PP)	Shum Siu-hung (Ind)		Independent hold
F14	Mei Foo North	Ambrose Cheung Wing-sum (Ind)	Alpha Keung Chung-yin (Civ)	Ambrose Cheung Wing-sum (Ind)		Independent hold
F15	Lai Chi Kok North	Chong Chi-tat (DP)	Wong Leung-hi (DP); Tam Sai-kit	Bruce Li Ki-fung (Ind)	Leung Chiu-hung (Ind); Lai Chi-leung (Ind)	Independent gain from Democratic
F16	Un Chau & So Uk	Chan Wai-ming (DAB)	Sze Tak-loy (ADPL); Tang Mei-ching (LSD)	Chan Wai-ming (DAB)		DAB hold
F17	Lei Cheng Uk	Kwun Sai-leung (ADPL)	Kong Kwai-sang (ADPL); Chin Wai-lok (PP)	Chan Keng-chau (Ind)		Independent gain from ADPL
F18	Ha Pak Tin	Yan Kai-wing (Ind)	Yan Kai-wing (Ind); Yeung Yuk (ADPL)			Independent hold
F19	Yau Yat Tsuen	Kwok Chun-wah (Ind)	Lee Kin-kan (ADPL)	Kwok Chun-wah (Ind)		Independent hold
F20	Nam Shan, Tai Hang Tung & Tai Hang Sai	Wong Kwai-wan (ADPL)	Tam Kwok-kiu (ADPL)	Wai Hoi-ying (Ind); Louis Lui Man-fung (Ind)		Independent gain from ADPL
F21	Lung Ping & Sheung Pak Tin	Carman Ng Mei (ADPL)	Carman Ng Mei (ADPL); Cheung Pun-chiu (PP)	Chan Kin-yip (LP)		ADPL hold

=== Kowloon City ===
Code	Constituency	Incumbent	Pro-democracy Candidate(s)	Pro-Beijing Candidate(s)	Other Candidate(s)	Results
G01	Ma Tau Wai	Rosanda Mok Ka-han (ADPL)	Rosanda Mok Ka-han (ADPL)	Lam Sum-lim (DAB/FTU)		ADPL hold
G02	Ma Hang Chung	Wong Yun-cheong (DAB/FTU)	Yu Chung-yin (ADPL)	Wong Yun-cheong (DAB/FTU)	Yau Lau-chun (Ind)	DAB/FTU hold
G03	Ma Tau Kok	Li Lin (Ind)		Li Lin (Ind)	Leung Koon-wah (Ind)	Independent hold
G04	Lok Man	Yang Wing-kit (Ind)		Yang Wing-kit (Ind)		Independent uncontested
G05	Sheung Lok	Luk King-kwong (DAB)	Wong Wing-kit (ADPL)	Luk King-kwong (DAB)		DAB hold
G06	Ho Man Tin	Ng Ching-man (Civ)	Ng Ching-man (Civ)	Cheng Lee-ming (Ind)		Independent gain from Civic
G07	Kadoorie	Chan King-wong (Ind)	Siu Leong-sing (ADPL); Tsang Wai-hin (PP)	Chan King-wong (Ind)		ADPL gain from Independent
G08	Prince	Wong Yee-him (Ind)	Tang Chi-ying (Civ)	Wong Yee-him (Ind)		Independent hold
G09	Kowloon Tong	Ho Hin-ming (LP)		Ho Hin-ming (LP)		Liberal uncontested
G10	Lung Shing	Ng Po-keung (DAB/FTU)	Chan Tsun-kiu (PP)	Ng Po-keung (DAB/FTU)		DAB/FTU hold
G11	Kai Tak	Liu Sing-lee (ADPL)	Yeung Chun-yu (ADPL); Lee Hon-sam (PP)	Alexander Ip Chi-wai (ES); Cheung Fan-lan (DAB/FTU)		ADPL hold
G12	Hoi Sham	Pun Kwok-wah (DAB)		Pun Kwok-wah (DAB)	Edwin Town Man-hoi (Ind)	DAB hold
G13	To Kwa Wan North	Starry Lee Wai-king (DAB)	Cody Wong Tze-hei (DP)	Starry Lee Wai-king (DAB)		DAB hold
G14	To Kwa Wan South	Pun Chi-man (DP)	Pun Chi-man (DP)	Ng Yuen-tat (Ind)		Democratic hold
G15	Hok Yuen Laguna Verde	Siu Yuen-sheung (DAB)	Ip Kwan-ho (Civ)	Siu Yuen-sheung (DAB)		DAB hold
G16	Whampoa East	Leung Mei-fun (Ind)	Wong Pik-wan (DP); Jeff Au Yeung Ying-kit (PP/PV)	Leung Mei-fun (Ind)		Independent hold
G17	Whampoa West	Lau Wai-wing (Ind)	Lo Chun-kit (DP)	Lau Wai-wing (Ind)		Independent hold
G18	Hung Hom Bay	Cheung Yan-hong (Ind)	Foo Wai-lok (PP)	Cheung Yan-hong (Ind)		Independent hold
G19	Hung Hom	Pius Yum Kwok-tung (ADPL)	Pius Yum Kwok-tung (ADPL); Wong Chi-keung (CYRSC)	Chan Chung-cheung (DAB)		ADPL hold
G20	Ka Wai	Lo Chiu-kit (Ind)	Tsang Chiu-wai (PP)	Lo Chiu-kit (Ind)	Lee Chi-ching (HHSCO)	Independent hold
G21	Oi Man	Chan Lai-kwan (DP)	Chan Lai-kwan (DP)	Ng Fan-kam (DAB)		DAB gain from Democratic
G22	Oi Chun	Cho Wui-hung (Ind)	Chan Yau-cheong (Civ)	Cho Wui-hung (Ind)	Chan Yin-ling (Ind)	Independent hold

=== Wong Tai Sin ===
Code	Constituency	Incumbent	Pro-democracy Candidate(s)	Pro-Beijing Candidate(s)	Other Candidate(s)	Results
H01	Lung Tsui	Wong Kam-chi (Ind)		Wong Kam-chi (Ind)		Independent uncontested
H02	Lung Ha	Kwok Sau-ying (Ind)	Kwok Sau-ying (Ind)	Lee Tung-kong (DAB)		Independent hold
H03	Lung Sheung	Lam Man-fai (DAB)	Lam Wai-kei (DP); Edward Yum Liang-hsien (PP)	Chan Yuen-han (FTU)		FTU gain from DAB
H04	Fung Wong	Joe Chan Yim-kwong (Ind)	Joe Chan Yim-kwong (Ind); Wong Hin-wai (LSD)	Cheung Chi-wang (LP)		Independent hold
H05	Fung Tak	Kan Chi-ho (DAB)		Kan Chi-ho (DAB)	Wong Kwok-keung (Ind); Ferdinand Fu Moon-fong (Ind)	DAB hold
H06	Lung Sing	Choi Luk-sing (Ind)	Tam Heung-man (Ind)	Choi Luk-sing (Ind)	Simon Chan Wai-sun (Ind)	Independent gain from Independent
H07	San Po Kong	Lee Tat-yan (Ind)	Paul Leung Yat-ming (LSD)	Lee Tat-yan (Ind); Wat Ki-on (NPP)		Independent hold
H08	Tung Tau	Li Tak-hong (DAB)		Li Tak-hong (DAB)		DAB uncontested
H09	Tung Mei	Mok Ying-fan (ADPL)	Mok Ying-fan (ADPL)	Lam Man-fai (DAB)		ADPL hold
H10	Lok Fu	Andie Chan Wai-kwan (Ind)		Andie Chan Wai-kwan (Ind)		Independent uncontested
H11	Wang Tau Hom	Joe Lai Wing-ho (DAB)	Wong Shun-yin (Civ)	Joe Lai Wing-ho (DAB)		DAB hold
H12	Tin Keung	Chan On-tai (LP)	Wong Hok-ming (Civ)	Chan On-tai (LP)		Liberal hold
H13	Tsui Chuk & Pang Ching	So Sik-kin (Ind)		So Sik-kin (Ind)		Independent uncontested
H14	Chuk Yuen South	Hui Kam-shing (ADPL)	Hui Kam-shing (ADPL)	Chong Chak-choi (FTU)		ADPL hold
H15	Chuk Yuen North	Andrew To Kwan-hang (LSD)	Andrew To Kwan-hang (LSD)	Roy Ting Chi-wai (Ind)	Chan Ka-wai (Ind)	Independent gain from LSD
H16	Tsz Wan West	Yuen Kwok-keung (DAB)	Lui Wing-kei (DP)	Yuen Kwok-keung (DAB)		DAB hold
H17	Ching Oi	Maggie Chan Man-ki (DAB)		Maggie Chan Man-ki (DAB)		DAB uncontested
H18	Ching On	Wong Yat-yuk (Ind)	Wong Yat-yuk (Ind)	Chan Chak-sum (FTU)		Independent hold
H19	Tsz Wan East	Ho Hon-man (DAB/FTU)		Ho Hon-man (DAB/FTU)		DAB/FTU uncontested
H20	King Fu	Wu Chi-wai (DP)	Wu Chi-wai (DP)	Guo Shan-zhen (Ind)		Democratic hold
H21	Choi Wan East	Wong Kwok-tung (DP)	Wong Kwok-tung (DP)	Timothy Choy Tsz-kin (DAB)	Lok Wai-chuen (Ind)	Democratic hold
H22	Choi Wan South	Chan Lee-shing (DP)	Sum Wan-wa (DP)	Cheung Sze-chun (DAB)		Democratic hold
H23	Choi Wan West	Chui Pak-tai (DP)	Chui Pak-tai (DP)	Tam Mei-po (DAB/FTU)	Leung Chun-wah (Ind)	DAB/FTU gain from Democratic
H24	Chi Choi	Ho Yin-fai (DAB/FTU)	Chui Ka-chun (DP)	Ho Yin-fai (DAB/FTU)		DAB/FTU hold
H25	Choi Hung	Mok Kin-wing (FTU/DAB)	Tsoi Chi-yin (CHESSA)	Mok Kin-wing (FTU/DAB)		FTU/DAB hold

=== Kwun Tong ===
Code	Constituency	Incumbent	Pro-democracy Candidate(s)	Pro-Beijing Candidate(s)	Other Candidate(s)	Results
J01	Kwun Tong Central	Nelson Chan Wah-yu (Ind)	Lai Yuen-pan (Ind)	Nelson Chan Wah-yu (Ind)	Ricky Tsui Wing-chuen (Ind)	Independent hold
J02	Kowloon Bay	Winnie Poon Yam Wai-chun (Ind)	Winnie Poon Yam Wai-chun (Ind)		Alex Tou Tat-lung (Ind)	Independent hold
J03	Kai Yip	Sze Lun-hung (DAB)		Sze Lun-hung (DAB)		DAB uncontested
J04	Lai Ching	Poon Chun-yuen (DAB)	Sunny Chan Tsz-kit (Civ)	Poon Chun-yuen (DAB)		DAB hold
J05	Ping Shek	Bernard Chan Pak-li (DAB)	Lam Sum-shing (LSD)	Bernard Chan Pak-li (DAB)		DAB hold
J06	Sheung Choi	New Seat	Ying Wing-ho (DP); Wong Ka-lok (LSD)	Tam Siu-cheuk (DAB)		DAB gain new seat
J07	Jordan Valley	Wong Wai-tag (DP)	Wong Wai-tag (DP)	Ngan Man-yu (DAB)		DAB gain from Democratic
J08	Shun Tin	Kwok Bit-chun (DAB/FTU)		Kwok Bit-chun (DAB/FTU)		DAB/FTU uncontested
J09	Sheung Shun	Fu Pik-chun (Ind)		Fu Pik-chun (Ind)		Independent uncontested
J10	On Lee	Choy Chak-hung (Ind)	Choy Chak-hung (Ind)			Independent uncontested
J11	Po Tat	Hung Kam-in (DAB)		Hung Kam-in (DAB)		DAB uncontested
J12	Sau Mau Ping North	Ng Siu-cheung (Ind)	Kai Ming-wah (DP)	Wong Chun-ping (Ind)		Independent gain from Independent
J13	Hiu Lai	So Lai-chun (Ind)		So Lai-chun (Ind)	Li Kong-sang (Ind)	Independent hold
J14	Sau Mau Ping South	Mak Fu-ling (DAB)	Li Yiu-kee (DP)	Mak Fu-ling (DAB)		DAB hold
J15	Hing Tin	Chan Man-kin (DP)	Chan Man-kin (DP); Timothy Chan Tin-tsan (PP/PV)	Yu Shing-hei (FTU/DAB)	Sun Hung-wa (Ind)	Democratic hold
J16	Lam Tin	Kan Ming-tung (DAB/FTU)	Lee Kai-man (Civ)	Kan Ming-tung (DAB/FTU)		DAB/FTU hold
J17	Kwong Tak	Wilson Or Chong-shing (DAB/FTU)		Wilson Or Chong-shing (DAB/FTU)		DAB/FTU uncontested
J18	Ping Tin	Yiu Pak-leung (Ind)		Yiu Pak-leung (Ind)		Independent uncontested
J19	Pak Nga	Francis Tang Chi-ho (Ind)	Francis Tang Chi-ho (Ind)	Ho Kai-ming (FTU)		FTU gain from Independent
J20	Yau Tong East	Fan Wai-kwong (Ind)	Kam Cheung-cheung (DP); Aristy Tam Shu-fan (LSD)	Cheung Ki-tang (DAB)		DAB gain from Independent
J21	Yau Lai	New Seat	Mok Kin-shing (DP); Au Yun-fo (LSD)	Patrick Lai Shu-ho (Ind)		Independent gain new seat
J22	Chui Cheung	New Seat	Tse Suk-chun (Ind); Julius Anothony Leung (PP/TF); Lee Fung-nin (LSD)	Liu Kit-ming (NPP); Frederick Lau Chong-him (FTU)		Independent gain new seat
J23	Yau Tong West	Lui Tung-hai (Ind)	Hon Ka-ming (DP)	Lui Tung-hai (Ind)		Independent hold
J24	Laguna City	Tang Wing-chun (Ind)		Tang Wing-chun (Ind)		Independent uncontested
J25	King Tin	Cheung Shun-wah (Ind)	Remzi Wu Hing-yin (LSD)	Cheung Shun-wah (Ind)		Independent hold
J26	Tsui Ping	New Seat	Lam Ka-keung (Ind)	Fung Mei-wan (Ind)		Independent gain new seat
J27	Po Lok	Lau Ting-on (Ind)	Luk Tai-hang (LSD)	Lau Ting-on (Ind)		Independent hold
J28	Yuet Wah	Hsu Hoi-shan (Ind)		Hsu Hoi-shan (Ind)	Lam Chi-yau (Ind)	Independent hold
J29	Hip Hong	Leung Fu-Wing (Ind)	David Kan Sun-wa (LSD)	Bunny Chan Chung-bun (Ind)		Independent gain from Independent
J30	Hong Lok	Ma Yat-chiu (Ind)	Lau Wai-chung (LSD)	Ma Yat-chiu (Ind)	Wu Kin-wa (Ind)	Independent hold
J31	Ting On	Wong Kai-ming (DP)	Wong Kai-ming (DP)	Kam Kin (Ind)		Democratic hold
J32	Ngau Tau Kok	Ben Chan Kok-wah (DAB)		Ben Chan Kok-wah (DAB)		DAB uncontested
J33	To Tai	Yip Hing-kwok (Ind)			Yip Hing-kwok (Ind)	Independent uncontested
J34	Lok Wah North	Fung Kam-yuen (Ind)	Yeung Kwok-hung (LSD)	Fung Kam-yuen (Ind)		Independent hold
J35	Lok Wah South	Kevin So Koon-chung (Ind)	Kevin So Koon-chung (Ind)	Amy Hui Wai-fung (FTU/DAB)		Independent hold

=== Tsuen Wan ===
Code	Constituency	Incumbent	Pro-democracy Candidate(s)	Pro-Beijing Candidate(s)	Other Candidate(s)	Results
K01	Tak Wah	Lo Siu-kit (Ind)	Lai King-wai (DP)	Lo Siu-kit (Ind)		Independent hold
K02	Yeung Uk Road	Chan Han-pan (DAB)	Yip Sui-lun (Civ)	Chan Han-pan (DAB)		DAB hold
K03	Hoi Bun	Chow Ping-tim (Ind)	Lee Wai-yee (PP)	Chow Ping-tim (Ind)	Cheng Pak-keung (Ind)	Independent hold
K04	Clague Garden	Chan Kam-lam (DAB)	Eddy lam Kwong-yiu (PP)	Chan Kam-lam (DAB)		DAB hold
K05	Fuk Loi	Kot Siu-yuen (FTU)	Mui Yee-ling (DP)	Kot Siu-yuen (FTU)		FTU hold
K06	Discovery Park	Louis Wong Yui-tak (DP)	Louis Wong Yui-tak (DP)	Michael Tien Puk-sun (NPP)		NPP gain from Democratic
K07	Tsuen Wan Centre	Cheung Ho-ming (DAB)	Li Hung-por (DP)	Tsang Tai (DAB)		Democratic gain from DAB
K08	Allway	Sarena Young Fuk-ki (Ind)		Lam Yuen-pun (Ind)		Independent gain from Independent
K09	Lai To	Wong Wai-kit (Ind)	Everest Kwok Chi-kin (PP)	Wong Wai-kit (Ind)		Independent hold
K10	Lai Hing	Albert Chan Wai-yip (PP)	Jacqueline Chan So-ling (PP)	Nixie Lam Lam (DAB); Au Ming-sze (LP)		DAB gain from PP
K11	Tsuen wan Rural West	Choi Shing-for (Ind)	Justin Tseng Wen-tien (Ind)	Moses Lee (NPP)	Katherine Wong Young Mo-lin (Ind)	Independent gain from Independent
K12	Tsuen Wan Rural East	Chan Wai-ming (Ind)		Chan Wai-ming (Ind)		Independent uncontested
K13	Luk Yeung	Lam Faat-kang (Ind)	So Yiu-kwan (Civ)	Lam Faat-kang (Ind)		Independent hold
K14	Lei Muk Shue East	Sumly Chan Yuen-sum (Civ)	Sumly Chan Yuen-sum (Civ)	Lui Dik-ming (DAB)	Chau Wai-yee (Ind)	Civic hold
K15	Lei Muk Shue West	Wong Ka-wa (Civ)	Wong Ka-wa (Civ)	Wong Tak-chi (FTU)		Civic hold
K16	Shek Wai Kok	Man Yu-ming (NTAS)		Man Yu-ming (NTAS)		NTAS uncontested
K17	Cheung Shek	Choy Tsz-man (DP)	Choy Tsz-man (DP); Aden Wong Chi-shun (PP/TF)	Chan Chun-chung (DAB)		DAB gain from Democratic

=== Tuen Mun ===
Code	Constituency	Incumbent	Pro-democracy Candidate(s)	Pro-Beijing Candidate(s)	Other Candidate(s)	Results
L01	Tuen Mun Town Centre	Au Chi-yuen (Ind)	Chan Ka-kin (DP)	Au Chi-yuen (Ind); Yeung Man-tat (NPP)	Lau Ka-lun (Ind)	Independent hold
L02	Siu Chi	Lam Chung-hoi (DP)	Lam Chung-hoi (DP)	Law Yiu-chuen (Ind)	Wong Ka-leung (Ind)	Democratic hold
L03	Siu Tsui	Lo Man-hon (DP)	Lo Man-hon (DP); Ho Wing-tung (PP)	Yip Man-pan (DAB)		Democratic hold
L04	On Ting	Kong Fung-yi (ADPL)	Kong Fung-yi (ADPL)	Leung Chi-ho (FTU/DAB)		ADPL hold
L05	Yau Oi South	Cheung Yuet-lan (DP)	Cheung Yuet-lan (DP); Lai Ka-long (PP/PV)	Tsang Hin-hong (DAB)		DAB gain from Democratic
L06	Yau Oi North	Chan Wan-sang (DAB)	Lam Lap (DP)	Chan Wan-sang (DAB)		DAB hold
L07	Tsui Hing	Chu Yiu-wah (Ind)	Ng Siu-hong (DP)	Chu Yiu-wah (Ind)		Independent hold
L08	Shan King	Ng Koon-hung (Ind)		Ng Koon-hung (Ind)	Leung Man-pun (Ind)	Independent hold
L09	King Hing	Chan Yau-hoi (FTU/DAB)		Chan Yau-hoi (FTU/DAB)		FTU/DAB uncontested
L10	Hing Tsak	Tsui Fan (FTU/DAB)	Seto Chun-pong (DP)	Tsui Fan (FTU/DAB)		FTU/DAB hold
L11	San Hui	Kwu Hon-keung (Ind)	Ma Yuk-mui (DP)	Kwu Hon-keung (Ind)		Independent hold
L12	Sam Shing	So Shiu-shing (Ind)		So Shiu-shing (Ind)	Yung Sai-ming (Ind)	Independent hold
L13	Hanford	Li Kwai-fong (Ind)	Beatrice Chu Shun-nga (DP)	Keung Kai-pong (Ind)	Li Kwai-fong (Ind)	Democratic gain from Independent
L14	Fu Sun	Lung Kang-san (Ind)		Lung Kang-san (Ind)	Ho Pui-han (Ind); Elsa Li Shuk-san (Ind)	Independent hold
L15	Yuet Wu	Cheung Hang-fai (DAB)	Natalie Yip Lai-mei (PD)	Cheung Hang-fai (DAB)	Kwun Tung-wing (Ind)	DAB hold
L16	Siu Hei	Yim Ting-sang (ADPL)	Yim Ting-sang (ADPL)	Hau Kwok-tung (DAB)		ADPL hold
L17	Wu King	Leung Kin-man (DAB)		Leung Kin-man (DAB)		DAB hold
L18	Butterfly	So Oi-kwan (DAB)	Wan Sui-kei (PP)	So Oi-kwan (DAB)	Tai Yin-chiu (Ind)	DAB hold
L19	Lok Tsui	Ho Chun-yan (DP)	Ho Chun-yan (DP); Albert Chan Wai-yip (PP)	Shum Kam-tim (Ind)		Democratic hold
L20	Lung Mun	Lung Shui-hing (DAB)	Fung Cheuk-ki (DP); Chan Kin-cheung (PP)	Lung Shui-hing (DAB)		DAB hold
L21	San King	Catherine Wong Lai-sheung (DP)	Catherine Wong Lai-sheung (DP)	Lee Fung-sim (DAB)		Democratic hold
L22	Leung King	Ching Chi-hung (DAB)	Tang Wai-keung (DP)	Ching Chi-hung (DAB)		DAB hold
L23	Tin King	Lothar Lee Hung-sham (DAB)	Tsang Chun-hing (PD)	Lothar Lee Hung-sham (DAB)		DAB hold
L24	Po Tin	So Ka-man (Ind); Chan Sau-wan (DAB)		Chan Sau-wan (DAB)	Chung Yiu-yee (Ind); Kong Wan-ching (Ind)	Independent gain from DAB
L25	Kin Sang	Chan Man-wah (DAB)	Lee Kam-tim (Civ)	Chan Man-wah (DAB)		DAB hold
L26	Siu Hong	Josephine Chan Shu-ying (DP)	Josephine Chan Shu-ying (DP); Man Chi-kit (PP)	Mo Shing-fung (DAB)		Democratic hold
L27	Prime View	Ho Hang-mui (DP)	Ho Hang-mui (DP); Raymond Lai (PP)	Chui Kwan-ngai (LP)		Democratic hold
L28	Fu Tai	Manwell Chan (FTU/DAB)	Fong Lai-man (DP)	Manwell Chan (FTU/DAB)		FTU/DAB hold
L29	Tuen Mun Rural	To Sheck-yuen (Ind)		To Sheck-yuen (Ind)		Independent uncontested

=== Yuen Long ===
Code	Constituency	Incumbent	Pro-democracy Candidate(s)	Pro-Beijing Candidate(s)	Other Candidate(s)	Results
M01	Fung Nin	Lui Kin (DAB)	Lee Ka-wah (PP)	Lui Kin (DAB)		DAB hold
M02	Shui Pin	Yuen Man-yee (Ind)		Yuen Man-yee (Ind); Wong Kin-wing (Ind)		Independent hold
M03	Nam Ping	Zachary Wong Wai-yin (DP)	Zachary Wong Wai-yin (DP)	Yau Ka-keung (DAB)		Democratic hold
M04	Pek Long	Kwong Chun-yu (DP)	Kwong Chun-yu (DP)	Chan Chi-wai (DAB)		Democratic hold
M05	Yuen Long Centre	Siu Long-ming (DAB)	Hui Chiu-fan (PP)	Siu Long-ming (DAB)		DAB hold
M06	Fung Cheung	Mak Ip-sing (PP)	Mak Ip-sing (PP)	Yu Chung-leung (DAB)		People Power hold
M07	Shap Pat Heung North	Shum Ho-kit (Ind)		Shum Ho-kit (Ind)		Independent uncontested
M08	Shap Pat Heung South	Lam Tim-fook (Ind)		Ching Chan-ming (Ind); Leung Ming-kin (Ind)		Independent gain from Independent
M09	Ping Shan South	Wong Shing-tong (Ind)		Cheung Muk-lam (NTAS); Wong Shing-tong (Ind)		NTAS gain from Independent
M10	Ping Shan North	Tang Hing-ip (Ind)		Tang Hing-ip (Ind)		Independent uncontested
M11	Ha Tsuen	Tang Ka-leung (Ind)		Tang Ka-leung (Ind)		Independent uncontested
M12	Tin Shing	Chan Wai-ching (Ind)		Chan Sze-ching (LP); Chan Wai-ching (Ind)		Liberal gain from Independent
M13	Shui Oi	Kwok Keung (DAB)		Kwok Keung (DAB)		DAB hold
M14	Shui Wah	Chow Wing-kan (LP)	Lau Kwun-hang (Civ)	Chow Wing-kan (LP); Ko Chun-kit (Ind)		Liberal hold
M15	Chung Wah	Fung Choi-yuk (DAB)	Liu Yam (PP)	Wong Wai-ling (DAB)		DAB hold
M16	Yuet Yan	Chiu Sau-han (Ind)	Keung Kwok-wai (CTU)	Chiu Sau-han (Ind)		Independent hold
M17	Fu Yan	Vacant	Lee Cheuk-yan (CTU)	Lau Kwai-yung (FTU)		FTU gain
M18	Yat Chak	Wong Yu-choi (Ind)	Kwok Hing-ping (DP)	Wong Yu-choi (Ind)		Democratic gain from Independent
M19	Tin Heng	Luk Chung-hung (DAB/FTU)		Luk Chung-hung (DAB/FTU)		DAB/FTU uncontested
M20	Wang Yat	Yiu Kwok-wai (FTU/DAB)	Ng Yuk-ying (DP)	Yiu Kwok-wai (FTU/DAB)	Ho Ka-hong (Ind)	FTU/DAB hold
M21	Ching King	New Seat	Michael Wong Chun-tat (NWSC)	Tang Cheuk-him (FTU); Lai Suet-wing (Ind)		FTU gain new seat
M22	Kingswood North	Lee Yuet-man (Ind)	Chu Siu-hung (PP)	Lee Yuet-man (Ind)		Independent hold
M23	Tsz Yau	Chan Mei-lin (Ind)	Chan Mei-lin (Ind)	Ma Shuk-yin (Ind)		Independent hold
M24	Tin Yiu	Leung Che-cheung (DAB)		Leung Che-cheung (DAB)		DAB uncontested
M25	Kingswood South	Cham Ka-hung (Ind)		Cham Ka-hung (Ind)		Independent uncontested
M26	Chung Pak	New Seat	Victor Yeung Sai-cheong (DP)	Wong Cheuk-kin (NPP); Tse Kui-sing (Ind); Chan Wai-man (LP); Thomas Li Tsz-keung (Ind)		NPP gain new seat
M27	Fairview Park	Yau Tai-tai (Ind)		Yau Tai-tai (Ind)		Independent uncontested
M28	San Tin	Man Luk-sing (Ind)	Chau Chun-kun (LJL)	Man Kwong-ming (Ind)		Independent gain from Independent
M29	Kam Tin	Tang Cheuk-yin (Ind)		Tang Cheuk-yin (Ind)		Independent uncontested
M30	Pat Heung North	Tang Kwai-yau (Ind)	Eddie Chu Hoi-dick (LJL)	Tang Kwai-yau (Ind); Ronnie Tang Yung-yiu (Ind)		Independent hold
M31	Pat Heung South	Lai Wai-hung (Ind)	Fancy Fung Yu-chuk (LJL)	Lai Wai-hung (Ind)		Independent hold

=== North ===
Code	Constituency	Incumbent	Pro-democracy Candidate(s)	Pro-Beijing Candidate(s)	Other Candidate(s)	Results
N01	Luen Wo Hui	Law Sai-yan (DP)	Law Sai-yan (DP)	Tsang Hing-lung (DAB)		Democratic hold
N02	Fanling Town	Ip Mei-ho (Ind)	Cheung Wai-yip (Ind); Gary Leung Ka-yue (DP); Ip Mei-ho (Ind)	George Pang Chun-sing (DAB)		DAB gain from Independent
N03	Cheung Wah	Chris Yip Yiu-shing (Ind)	Mok Siu-lun (Ind)	Chris Yip Yiu-shing (Ind)		Independent hold
N04	Wah Do	Poon Chung-yuen (DP)	Li Wing-shing (DP); Li Kai-hang (PP)	Yiu Ming (DAB)		DAB gain from Democratic
N05	Wah Ming	Lai Sum (DAB)	Almustafa Lee Lap-hong (DP)	Lai Sum (DAB)		DAB hold
N06	Yan Shing	Lau Kwok-fan (DAB)	Alexander Yan Wing-lok (DP)	Lau Kwok-fan (DAB)		DAB hold
N07	Shing Fuk	Warwick Wan Wo-tat (DAB)	Eric Wong Ho-chuen (DP)	Warwick Wan Wo-tat (DAB)		DAB hold
N08	Sheung Shui Rural	Hau Kam-lam (DAB)		Hau Kam-lam (DAB); Simon Hau Fuk-tat (Ind)		DAB hold
N09	Ching Ho	New Seat	Tim So Chin-lung (DP)	Larm Wai-leung (DAB)	Alexander Tsui Ka-kit (Ind)	DAB gain new seat
N10	Yu Tai	Larm Wai-leung (DAB)	Tsang Sheung-chi (DP)	Kent Tsang King-chung (FTU/DAB)		FTU/DAB gain from DAB
N11	Choi Yuen	So Sai-chi (DAB)	Wong Sing-chi (DP); Au Wai-kong (PP/TF)	So Sai-chi (DAB)		DAB hold
N12	Shek Wu Hui	Wong Sing-chi (DP)	Joseph Chow Kam-siu (DP); Cheung Suk-man (PP/TF)	Simon Wong Yun-keung (DAB); Alvan Hau Wing-kong (LP)		DAB gain from Democratic
N13	Tin Ping West	Wong Wang-to (FTU/DAB)	Yim Chi-hang (DP)	Wong Wang-to (FTU/DAB)		FTU/DAB hold
N14	Fung Tsui	Liu Kwok-wah (Ind)		Liu Kwok-wah (Ind); Liu Hing-hung (Ind); Liu Chiu-wah (Ind)		Independent hold
N15	Sha Ta	Wan Wo-fai (DAB)		Wan Wo-fai (DAB); Tsang Yuk-on (Ind)		DAB hold
N16	Tin Ping East	Paul Yu Chi-shing (Ind)	Leung Yuk-cheung (DP)	Windy Or Sin-yi (DAB); Paul Yu Chi-shing (Ind)	Simon Mok Fu-wah (Ind)	DAB gain from Independent
N17	Queen's Hill	Tony Tang Kun-nin (DAB)		Tony Tang Kun-nin (DAB); Li Kwong-ming (Ind)		DAB hold

=== Tai Po ===
Code	Constituency	Incumbent	Pro-democracy Candidate(s)	Pro-Beijing Candidate(s)	Other Candidate(s)	Results
P01	Tai Po Hui	Li Kwok-ying (DAB)	Alvin Yeung Ngok-kiu (Civ)	Li Kwok-ying (DAB)		DAB hold
P02	Tai Po Central	Andrew Cheng Kar-foo (Ind)	Au Chun-wah (DP)	Thomas Cheung Chi-wai (LP); Cheng Mei-lam (Ind)		Democratic gain from Independent
P03	Chung Ting	Eric Tam Wing-fun (DAB)		Eric Tam Wing-fun (DAB)		DAB uncontested
P04	Tai Yuen	Cheng Chun-ping (DAB)		Cheng Chun-ping (DAB); So Ma-tsun (Ind)		DAB hold
P05	Fu Heng	Wong Chau-pak (DAB)	Yam Man-chuen (DP)	Wong Chau-pak (DAB)		DAB hold
P06	Yee Fu	Yam Kai-bong (ND)	Yam Kai-bong (ND)	Clement Woo Kin-man (DAB)		Neo Democrats hold
P07	Fu Ming Sun	Kwan Wing-yip (ND)	Kwan Wing-yip (ND)	Wong Yuen-sang (DAB)		Neo Democrats hold
P08	Kwong Fuk & Plover Cove	Lam Chuen (DAB)		Lam Chuen (DAB)		DAB uncontested
P09	Wang Fuk	Wong Pik-kiu (DAB)		Wong Pik-kiu (DAB)		DAB uncontested
P10	Tai Po Kau	Chan Siu-kuen (Ind)		Chan Siu-kuen (Ind)		Independent uncontested
P11	Wan Tau Tong	Yu Chi-wing (Ind)	Edward Lee Chi-shing (DP)	Yu Chi-wing (Ind)	Chan Hon-hung (Ind)	Independent hold
P12	San Fu	Lo Sou-chour (Ind)		Lo Sou-chour (Ind); Donald Chung Yuk-fai (Ind)	Lam Ching-lun (Ind)	Independent hold
P13	Lam Tsuen Valley	Chan Cho-leung (Ind)		Chan Cho-leung (Ind)	Cheung Kwok-yiu (Ind)	Independent hold
P14	Po Nga	Wong Yung-kan (DAB)	Kenneth Cheung Kam-hung (CR)	Wong Yung-kan (DAB)		DAB hold
P15	Tai Wo	Cheng Chun-wo (Ind)		Cheng Chun-wo (Ind)	Lily Lee Lai-lai (Ind)	Independent hold
P16	Old Market & Serenity	Wong Chun-wai (ND)	Edmund Lee Kin-man (DP); Yik Kin-hing (TPNDL)	Cheung Kwok-wai (DAB)	Leung Ming-kwong (Ind)	DAB gain from Neo Democrats
P17	Hong Lok Yuen	Tang Yau-fat (Ind)		Tang Yau-fat (Ind)		Independent uncontested
P18	Shuen Wan	Lo Sam-shing (Ind)		Lau Chee-sing (Ind); Lo Sam-shing (Ind); Raymond Wong Wai-tong		Independent gain from Independent
P19	Sai Kung North	David Ho Tai-wai (Ind)		David Ho Tai-wai (Ind); Li Yiu-ban (Ind)		Independent hold

=== Sai Kung ===
Code	Constituency	Incumbent	Pro-democracy Candidate(s)	Pro-Beijing Candidate(s)	Other Candidate(s)	Results
Q01	Sai Kung Central	Ng Sze-fuk (DAB)		Ng Sze-fuk (DAB)		DAB uncontested
Q02	Pak Sha Wan	Hiew Moo-siew (DAB)		Hiew Moo-siew (DAB)		DAB uncontested
Q03	Sai Kung Islands	Wan Yuet-kau (DAB)		Philip Li Ka-leung (DAB); Cheung Kwok-hung (Ind)		DAB hold
Q04	Hang Hau East	Peter Lau Wai-cheung (Ind)		Peter Lau Wai-cheung (Ind)		Independent uncontested
Q05	Hang Hau West	Yau Yuk-lun (DAB)		Yau Yuk-lun (DAB)		DAB uncontested
Q06	Po Kwan	Ng Shuet-shan (FTU)	Tse Ching-fung (DP); Yu Hon-lun (Ind)	Ng Shuet-shan (FTU)		FTU hold
Q07	Wai Do	Chan Kai-wai (Ind)			Chan Kai-wai (Ind)	Independent uncontested
Q08	Kin Shin	Leung Li (ND)	Leung Li (ND)	Lee Chun-ho (CF)	Adam Wong Ping-hung (Ind); Wong Yan-ket (Ind)	Neo Democrats hold
Q09	Choi Kin	Raymond Ho Man-kit (Ind)	Raymond Ho Man-kit (Ind)	Yu Kai-chun (FTU)		Independent hold
Q10	O Tong	Cheung Kwok-keung (ND)	Cheung Kwok-keung (ND)	Tim Lo Man-him (NPP)		Neo Democrats hold
Q11	Fu Kwan	Luk Ping-choi (Ind)	Luk Ping-choi (Ind)	Lam Chun-ka (LP)	Lui Kim-ho (Ind)	Independent hold
Q12	Nam On	Francis Chau Yin-ming (Ind)	Francis Chau Yin-ming (Ind)	Timothy Chan Shu-kuen (LP)		Independent hold
Q13	Hong King	Frankie Lam Siu-chung (DP)	Frankie Lam Siu-chung (DP)	Leung Lok-sum (CF)		Democratic hold
Q14	Tsui Lam	Lanny Tam (CF)	Shek Chi-keung (Ind)	Lanny Tam (CF)		Civil Force hold
Q15	Po Lam	Alfred Au Ning-fat (CF)	Chan Ping-hang (DP)	Alfred Au Ning-fat (CF)		Civil Force hold
Q16	Yan Ying	Ng Ping-yiu (DAB)	Chung Kam-lun (ND)	Sunny Wong Man-kit (Ind)	Cheung Man-kit (Ind)	Neo Democrats gain from DAB
Q17	Wan Hang	Gary Fan Kwok-wai (ND)	Gary Fan Kwok-wai (ND)	Hau Lai-ying (DAB)		Neo Democrats hold
Q18	King Lam	Ki Lai-mei (DAB)	Lam Wing-yin (DP)	Ki Lai-mei (DAB)		Democratic gain from DAB
Q19	Hau Tak	Ling Man-hoi (DAB)	Chung En-shiuh (DP)	Ling Man-hoi (DAB)		DAB hold
Q20	Fu Nam	Chan Kwok-kai (DAB)		Chan Kwok-kai (DAB)		DAB uncontested
Q21	Tak Ming	Wan Yuet-cheung (CF)	Jersey Cheung Bo-hop (Ind)	Wan Yuet-cheung (CF)		Civil Force hold
Q22	Sheung Tak	Luk Wai-man (DAB)	Mak Tsz-hei (ND)	Kan Siu-kei (FTU); Luk Man-wai (DAB)	Yip Chun-keung (Ind); Wong Fai (Ind); Tsui Chung-chi (Ind)	FTU gain from DAB
Q23	Kwong Ming	Ricky Or Yiu-lam (DP)	Ricky Or Yiu-lam (DP); Virginia Yue (PP/PV); Chan Yin-chu (Ind)	Chong Yuen-tung (DAB)	Simon Shi Hau-kit (Ind); Chan Tong-wing (Ind)	DAB gain from Democratic
Q24	Wan Po	New Seat	Cheung Chi-tung (DP)	Christine Fong Kwok-shan (Ind); Terry Tsui Yun-yung (LP)		Independent gain new seat

=== Sha Tin ===
Code	Constituency	Incumbent	Pro-democracy Candidate(s)	Pro-Beijing Candidate(s)	Other Candidate(s)	Results
R01	Sha Tin Town Centre	Wai Hing-cheung (Ind)	Wai Hing-cheung (Ind)	Ken Tsang Kam-cheun (DAB)		Independent hold
R02	Lek Yuen	Tony Kan Chung-nin (Ind)	Wong Ho-ming (LSD)	Wong Yue-hon (CF)		Civil Force gain from Independent
R03	Wo Che Estate	Anna Yue Shin-man (DAB)		Anna Yue Shin-man (DAB)		DAB uncontested
R04	City One	Wong Ka-wing (Ind)	Ronny Tong Ka-wah (Civ)	Wong Ka-wing (Ind)		Independent hold
R05	Yue Shing	Leung Ka-fai (CF)	Chin Wai-kin (Civ)	Leung Ka-fai (CF); Lau Tai-sang (ES)		Civil Force hold
R06	Wong Uk	Leung Chi-wai (LP)		Leung Chi-wai (LP)		Liberal uncontested
R07	Sha Kok	Yeung Sin-hung (CF)	Cheung Tak-wing (Ind)	Yeung Sin-hung (CF)		Civil Force hold
R08	Pok Hong	Chan Kwok-tim (CF)	Pang Siu-ying (DP)	Chan Kwok-tim (CF)		Civil Force hold
R09	Jat Min	Lam Hong-wah (CF)	Yau Man-chun (ND)	Lam Hong-wah (CF)		Neo Democrats gain from Civil Force
R10	Chun Fung	Leung Chi-kin (CF)	Chan Nok-hang (DP)	Leung Chi-kin (CF)		Democratic gain from Civil Force
R11	Sun Tin Wai	Ching Cheung-ying (DP)	Ching Cheung-ying (DP)	Cheung Kwok-wo (FTU)		Democratic hold
R12	Chui Tin	Philip Wong Chak-piu (CF)	Ma Yu-sang (PP)	Philip Wong Chak-piu (CF)		Civil Force hold
R13	Hin Ka	Lam Chung-yan (CF)	Mok Wai-hung (DP)	Lam Chung-yan (CF)		Civil Force hold
R14	Lower Shing Mun	Ho Hau-cheung (CF)		Ho Hau-cheung (CF)		Civil Force uncontested
R15	Keng Hau	Wai Kwok-hung (CF)	Ng Kam-hung (DP)	Wong Ka-sek (CF)		Democratic gain from Civil Force
R16	Tin Sum	Pun Kwok-shan (CF)		Lau Kong-wah (DAB/CF)	Suen Tsan-pui (Ind)	DAB/Civil Force gain from Civil Force
R17	Chui Ka	New Seat	Li Sai-hung (Ind)	Lee Kam-ming (CF)		Civil Force gain new seat
R18	Tai Wai	Leung Wing-hung (ND)	Leung Wing-hung (ND)	Tung Kin-lei (DAB)		DAB gain from Neo Democrats
R19	Chung Tin	Tang Wing-cheong (CF)		Tang Wing-cheong (CF)	Lee Yuen-kam (Ind)	Civil Force hold
R20	Sui Wo	Thomas Pang Cheung-wai (DAB)	Pang Yuk-ying (Civ)	Thomas Pang Cheung-wai (DAB)	Li Sui-ha (Ind)	DAB hold
R21	Fo Tan	Scarlett Pong Oi-lan (Ind)	Chan Tak-cheung (CR)	Scarlett Pong Oi-lan (Ind)	Porinda Liu Huan-yee (Ind)	Independent hold
R22	Chun Ma	Siu Hin-hong (Ind)			Siu Hin-hong (Ind)	Independent uncontested
R23	Chung On	Elizabeth Quat (DAB)	Lau Ka-yee (PD)	Elizabeth Quat (DAB)		DAB hold
R24	Kam To	Yeung Man-yui (DAB)	Donna Yau Yuet-wah (DP)	Yeung Man-yui (DAB)	Tam Hin-chung (Ind)	DAB hold
R25	Ma On Shan Town Centre	Alvin Lee Chi-wing (Ind)	Richard Tsoi Yiu-cheong (DP)	Alvin Lee Chi-wing (Ind)		Independent hold
R26	Lee On	Tsoi Ah-chung (Ind)	Mak Yun-pui (DP)	Ada Lo Tai-suen (DAB)		Democratic gain from Independent
R27	Fu Lung	Law Kwong-keung (CF)		Law Kwong-keung (CF)		Civil Force uncontested
R28	Kam Ying	Tong Po-chun (Ind)		Tong Po-chun (Ind)	Wong Kwok-hung (Ind)	Independent hold
R29	Yiu On	Wong Mo-tai (DAB)	Ting Tsz-yuen (DP); Shirley Ho Suk-ping (Ind); Wilson Chu Kin-kong (PP/TF)	Li Sai-wing (DAB)		DAB hold
R30	Heng On	Cheng Tsuk-man (DP)	Cheng Tsuk-man (DP)	Leung Yiu-choi (DAB/FTU)		Democratic hold
R31	On Tai	Yeung Cheung-li (DAB)	Chow Wai-tung (DP); So Tat-leung (PP/TF)	Yeung Cheung-li (DAB)		DAB hold
R32	Tai Shui Hang	Michael Yung Ming-chau (ND)	Michael Yung Ming-chau (ND)	Cheung Chi-yin (DAB)	Law Yuet-wah (Ind)	Neo Democrats hold
R33	Yu Yan	Yiu Ka-chun (CF)	Chow Yiu-hong (Civ)	Yiu Ka-chun (CF)		Civil Force hold
R34	Bik Woo	Law Wai-lun (Ind)	Law Wai-lun (Ind); Eliza Tsang Man-yee (Civ)	Wong Ping-fan (DAB)		Independent hold
R35	Kwong Hong	Cheng Cho-kwong (DAB)	Ng Wai-ling (CTU)	Cheng Cho-kwong (DAB)		DAB hold
R36	Kwong Yuen	Chan Man-kuen (CF)		Chan Man-kuen (CF)		Civil Force uncontested

=== Kwai Tsing ===
Code	Constituency	Incumbent	Pro-democracy Candidate(s)	Pro-Beijing Candidate(s)	Other Candidate(s)	Results
S01	Kwai Hing	Leung Chi-shing (NWSC)	Leung Chi-shing (NWSC)	Chan Chi-hang (FTU)		NWSC hold
S02	Kwai Shing East Estate	Lai Fan-fong (DAB)	Rayman Chow Wai-hung (NWSC)	Lai Fan-fong (DAB)		NWSC gain from DAB
S03	Upper Tai Wo Hau	Hui Kei-cheung (DP)	Hui Kei-cheung (DP)	Loong Fei-wan (FTU)		Democratic hold
S04	Lower Tai Wo Hau	Wong Bing-kuen (DP)	Wong Bing-kuen (DP)	Tsui Siu-fai (FTU)		Democratic hold
S05	Kwai Chung Estate North	New Seat	Leung Kam-wai (NWSC)	Wong Siu-kwan (DAB)	Ng Hai-ming (Ind)	NWSC gain new seat
S06	Kwai Chung Estate Central	New Seat	Wong Yun-tat (NWSC)	Benny Ng Yam-fung (DAB)	Wong Fung-chun (Ind)	NWSC gain new seat
S07	Shek Yam	Andrew Wan Siu-kin (DP)	Andrew Wan Siu-kin (DP)	Wong Ho-yan (DAB)		Democratic hold
S08	On Yam	Dennis Leung Tsz-wing (FTU/DAB)	Leung Wing-kuen (DP)	Dennis Leung Tsz-wing (FTU/DAB)		FTU/DAB hold
S09	Shek Lei Extension	Leung Kwok-wah (DP)	Leung Kwok-wah (DP); Chan Ka-lok (PP)	Dominic Lee Tsz-king (LP)		Democratic hold
S10	Shek Lei	Lam Siu-fai (DP)	Lam Siu-fai (DP); Law Ka-kei (PP)	Liu Ming-kin (LP)		Democratic hold
S11	Tai Pak Tin	Sammy Tsui Sang-hung (DP)	Sammy Tsui Sang-hung (DP); Tsang Hang-mong (PP)	Lui Hok-nang (DAB)		Democratic hold
S12	Kwai Fong	Leung Yiu-chung (NWSC)	Leung Yiu-chung (NWSC)		Eddie Chan Wing-lai (GPHK)	NWSC hold
S13	Wah Lai	Wong Yiu-chung (Ind)		Wong Yiu-chung (Ind)		Independent uncontested
S14	Lai Wah	Lee Wing-tat (DP)	Lee Wing-tat (DP); Raymond Chan Chi-chuen (PP/PV)	Chu Lai-ling (DAB)		DAB gain from Democratic
S15	Cho Yiu	Lo Wai-lan (Ind)			Lo Wai-lan (Ind); Abby Lai Ming-wai (Ind)	Independent hold
S16	Hing Fong	Ng Kim-sing (DP)	Ng Kim-sing (DP)	Leung Kar-ming (DAB)		Democratic hold
S17	Lai King	Chow Yick-hay (DP)	Chow Yick-hay (DP)			Democratic uncontested
S18	Kwai Shing West Estate	Leung Yuk-fung (Civ)	Leung Yuk-fung (Civ)	Lau Mei-lo (FTU)		FTU gain from Civic
S19	On Ho	Tam Wai-chun (Ind)	Ho Chi-wai (DP)	Tam Wai-chun (Ind)		Independent hold
S20	Wai Ying	Alice Mak Mei-kuen (FTU)	Koo Man-hon (Civ)	Alice Mak Mei-kuen (FTU)		FTU hold
S21	Tsing Yi Estate	Simon Chan Siu-man (Ind)	Simon Chan Siu-man (Ind)	Poon Chi-nam (FTU/DAB)		Independent hold
S22	Greenfield	Wong Suet-ying (DP)	Wong Suet-ying (DP)	Clarice Cheung Wai-ching (Ind)		Independent gain from Democratic
S23	Cheung Ching	Alan Lee Chi-keung (Ind)		Alan Lee Chi-keung (Ind); Ting Yin-wah (Ind)		Independent hold
S24	Cheung Hong	Tsui Hiu-kit (Ind)		Tsui Hiu-kit (Ind)	Li May-ying (Ind)	Independent hold
S25	Shing Hong	Leung Wai-man (DAB)	Tsoi Yu-lung (DP)	Leung Wai-man (DAB)		DAB hold
S26	Tsing Yi South	Poon Chi-shing (DAB)		Poon Chi-shing (DAB)		DAB uncontested
S27	Cheung Hang	Lui Ko-wai (Ind)	Lam Lap-chi (DP); Lau Po-kwan (PP)	Lui Ko-wai (Ind)	Ha Lung-wan (Ind)	Democratic gain from Independent
S28	Ching Fat	Nancy Poon Siu-ping (Ind)	Lau Chi-kit (DP); Chan Yue-man (PP)	Nancy Poon Siu-ping (Ind)		Independent hold
S29	Cheung On	Law King-shing (DAB)		Law King-shing (DAB)		DAB uncontested

=== Islands ===
Code	Constituency	Incumbent	Pro-democracy Candidate(s)	Pro-Beijing Candidate(s)	Other Candidate(s)	Results
T01	Lantau	Wong Fuk-kan (Ind)		Wong Fuk-kan (Ind)	Ma Suet-fan (Ind)	Independent hold
T02	Yat Tung Estate North	Tang Ka-piu (FTU)	Kwok Ping (DP)	Tang Ka-piu (FTU)		FTU hold
T03	Yat Tung Estate South	Andy Lo Kwong-shing (DAB)	Tsui Ching-kuen (Ind)	Andy Lo Kwong-shing (DAB)		DAB hold
T04	Tung Chung North	Lam Yau-han (Civ)	Jeremy Jansen Tam Man-ho (Civ)	Lam Yuet (Ind)		Independent gain from Civic
T05	Tung Chung South	Chau Chuen-heung (DAB)	Cheng Lai-yee (Civ)	Chau Chuen-heung (DAB)		DAB hold
T06	Discovery Bay	Amy Yung Wing-sheung (Civ)	Amy Yung Wing-sheung (Civ)	Peter Lau Ching-wai (NPP)		Civic hold
T07	Peng Chau & Hei Ling Chau	Ma Chun-tim (Ind)	Chan Chi-lin (Ind)	Ma Chun-tim (Ind); On Hing-ying (Ind)		Independent gain from Independent
T08	Lamma & Po Toi	Yu Lai-fan (DAB)	Wong Chun-pong (LSD/LJL)	Yu Lai-fan (DAB)	Paul Lau (Ind)	DAB hold
T09	Cheung Chau South	Kwong Kwok-wai (Ind)	Kwok Cheuk-kin (DP)	Kwok Koon-wan (ES); Rico Lo Wan-kai (Ind); Anil Kwong Sai-loi; Stephen Sze Hou-ming (Ind)		Economic Synergy gain from Independent
T10	Cheung Chau North	Lee Kwai-chun (DAB)		Lee Kwai-chun (DAB)		DAB uncontested

== See also ==
- 2011 Hong Kong local elections
