= Pauline Ng (politician) =

Pauline Ng Chow May-Lin JP
- 伍周美蓮

Member of the Legislative Council
- In office 27 September 1983 – 25 August 1988
- Appointed by: Sir Edward Youde

Personal details
- Born: 1947 (age 78–79) Hong Kong
- Education: University of London
- Occupation: Teacher

Pauline Ng Chow May-Lin JP (born 1947, in Hong Kong) is a former member of the Legislative Council of Hong Kong.

After graduating from the University of London, she worked as a teacher in the Kit Sam Middle School. She ran for the first District Board election in 1982 in a Wang Tau Hom constituency for the Wong Tai Sin District Board. She continued to serve until 1991. She was subsequently appointed by Governor Edward Youde to the Legislative Council in 1983 and served until 1988.
