= Sai Kung Islands (constituency) =

Constituency of the Sai Kung District Council of Hong Kong

- Elected constituency for the Sai Kung District Council
- Boundary of Sai Kung Islands in Sai Kung District
- District: Sai Kung
- Legislative Council constituency: New Territories South East
- Population: 12,894 (2019)
- Electorate: 5,657 (2019)

Current constituency
- Created: 1982
- Number of members: One
- Member(s): Vacant

Sai Kung Islands (Chinese: 西貢離島) is one of the 29 constituencies in the Sai Kung District.

The constituency returns one district councillor to the Sai Kung District Council, with an election every four years.

Sai Kung Islands constituency is loosely based on part of Sai Kung Peninsula and outer islands with estimated population of 12,894.

== Councillors represented ==
Election	Member	Party
1982	Wan Yuet-kau	Nonpartisan
199?	Wan Yuet-kau	DAB
2011	Philip Li Ka-leung	DAB
2019	Debby Chan Ka-lam→Vacant	Sai Kung Commons

== Election results ==
=== 2010s ===
Sai Kung District Council Election, 2019: Sai Kung Islands
Party	Candidate	Votes	%	±%
Sai Kung Commons (PfD)	Debby Chan Ka-lam	2,127	57.81	
DAB	Philip Li Ka-leung	1,552	42.19	
Majority		575	15.62	
Turnout		3,689	65.26	
Sai Kung Commons gain from DAB		Swing		
