= Wang Tau Hom (constituency) =

- 橫頭磡
- Elected constituency for the Wong Tai Sin District Council
- Boundary of Wang Tau Hom in Wong Tai Sin District
- District: Wong Tai Sin
- Legislative Council constituency: Kowloon Central
- Population: 16,981 (2019)
- Electorate: 11,213 (2019)

Current constituency
- Created: 1982 (first time); 1994 (second time)
- Number of members: One
- Member: Vacant

Wang Tau Hom
- Traditional Chinese: 橫頭磡
Transcriptions
Yue: Cantonese
- Yale Romanization: Wàahng tàuh ham
- Jyutping: Waang4 tau4 ham3

Wang Tau Hom is one of the 25 constituencies in the Wong Tai Sin District in Hong Kong. The constituency returns one district councillor to the Wong Tai Sin District Council, with an election every four years.

The constituency has an estimated population of 16,981.

== Councillors represented ==
=== 1982 to 1985 ===
Election	Member	Party
1982	Pauline Ng Chow Mei-lin	Nonpartisan

=== 1985 to 1991 ===
Election	First Member	First Party	Second Member	Second Party
1985	Liu Sing-lee	PCPHP→ADPL	Pauline Ng Chow Mei-lin	Nonpartisan
1988	Liu Sing-lee	ADPL	Pauline Ng Chow Mei-lin	Nonpartisan

=== 1994 to present ===
Election	Member	Party
1994	Wong Yuk-fun	Independent
1999	Joe Lai Wing-ho	DAB
2003	Joe Lai Wing-ho	DAB
2007	Joe Lai Wing-ho	DAB
2011	Joe Lai Wing-ho	DAB
2015	Joe Lai Wing-ho	DAB
2019	Carmen Lau Ka-man→Vacant	Civic

== Election results ==
=== 2010s ===
Wong Tai Sin District Council Election, 2019: Wang Tau Hom
Party	Candidate	Votes	%	±%
Civic	Carmen Lau Ka-man	4,518	57.05	
DAB	Joe Lai Wing-ho	3,401	42.95	
Majority		1,117	14.10	
Turnout		7,942	70.90	
Civic gain from DAB		Swing		
