= Allway (constituency) =

Constituency of the Tsuen Wan District Council of Hong Kong

- Elected constituency for the Tsuen Wan District Council
- Boundary of Allway in Tsuen Wan District
- District: Tsuen Wan
- Legislative Council constituency: New Territories South West
- Population: 19,191 (2019)
- Electorate: 10,523 (2019)

Current constituency
- Created: 1994
- Number of members: One
- Member: Vacant

Allway (Chinese: 荃威) is one of the 19 constituencies in the Tsuen Wan District.

The constituency returns one district councillor to the Tsuen Wan District Council, with an election every four years.

Allway constituency has estimated population of 18,273.

== Councillors represented ==
Election	Member	Party
1982	Yip Chun-keung	UFSP
199?	Yip Chun-keung	Liberal
2003	Yeung Fuk-kei	Liberal
2011	Phyllis Lam Yuen-pun	Independent
2019	Chiu Yan-loy→Vacant	Labour

== Election results ==
=== 2010s ===
Tsuen Wan District Council Election, 2019: Allway
Party	Candidate	Votes	%	±%
Labour	Chiu Yan-loy	4,444	56.32	
Nonpartisan	Phyllis Lam Yuen-pun	3,446	43.68	
Majority		998	12.64	
Turnout		7,930	75.36	
Labour gain from Nonpartisan		Swing		
