= Sai Wan Ho (constituency) =

Hong Kong constituency

- Elected constituency for the Eastern District Council
- Boundary of Sai Wan Ho in Eastern District
- District: Eastern
- Legislative Council constituency: Hong Kong Island East
- Population: 20,013 (2019)
- Electorate: 9,277 (2019)

Current constituency
- Created: 1982
- Number of members: 1
- Member: Vacant

Sai Wan Ho is one of 35 constituencies in the Eastern District of Hong Kong.

The constituency elects one district councillor to the Eastern District Council every four years. It was created in the first District Board election in 1982 and was last held by Mak Tak-ching of the Labour Party.

Sai Wan Ho constituency is loosely based on the central area of Sai Wan Ho, with an estimated population of 20,013.

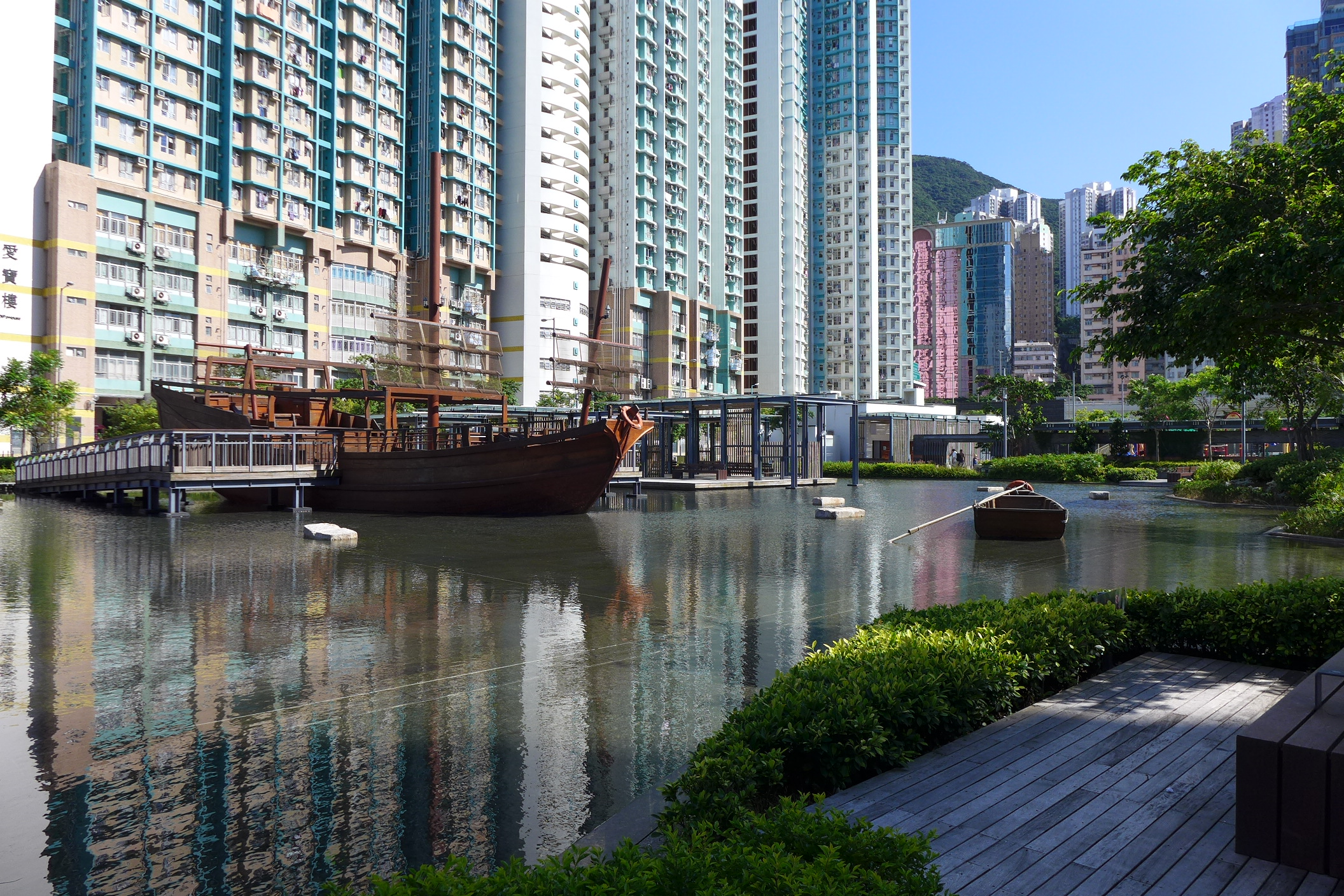
Aldrich Bay Park, Sai Wan Ho constituency

== Councillors represented ==
Election	Member	Party	%
1982	Cheung Kin-chung	Civic Association	60.84
1985	Cheung Kin-chung	Civic Association	71.77
1988	Alexander Fu Yuen-cheung	Independent	54.06
1991	Alexander Fu Yuen-cheung	Independent	67.55
1994	Kong Chack-ho	Independent	48.19
1999	Kong Chack-ho	Independent	N/A
2003	Kong Chack-ho	Independent	N/A
2007	Kong Chack-ho	Independent	N/A
2011	Kong Chack-ho	Independent	55.32
2015	Mak Tak-ching→Vacant (Note: Resigned on 9 July 2021.)	Labour	53.18
2019	Mak Tak-ching→Vacant	Labour	63.08

== Election results ==
=== 2010s ===
Eastern District Council Election, 2019: Sai Wan Ho
Party	Candidate	Votes	%	±%
Labour	Mak Tak-ching	4,323	63.08	+9.88
NPP	Victor Lam Tsz-hung	2,530	36.92	
Majority		1,793	26.16	
Turnout		6,879	74.15	
Labour hold		Swing		

Eastern District Council Election, 2015: Sai Wan Ho
Party	Candidate	Votes	%	±%
Labour	Mak Tak-ching	2,222	53.2	+8.5
Independent	Kong Chack-ho	1,956	46.8	–8.5
Majority		266	6.4	–4.2
Turnout		4,178	48.1	+10.2
Labour gain from Independent		Swing	+8.5	

Eastern District Council Election, 2011: Sai Wan Ho
Party	Candidate	Votes	%	±%
Independent	Kong Chack-ho	1,826	55.3	
Democratic Coalition	John Chan Hin-chung	1,475	44.7	
Majority		351	10.6	
Turnout		3,301	37.9	
Independent hold		Swing		

=== 2000s ===
Eastern District Council Election, 2007: Sai Wan Ho
Party	Candidate	Votes	%	±%
Independent	Kong Chack-ho	uncontested		
Independent hold		Swing		

Eastern District Council Election, 2003: Sai Wan Ho
Party	Candidate	Votes	%	±%
Independent	Kong Chack-ho	uncontested		
Independent hold		Swing		

=== 1990s ===
Eastern District Council Election, 1999: Sai Wan Ho
Party	Candidate	Votes	%	±%
Independent	Kong Chack-ho	uncontested		
Independent hold		Swing		

Eastern District Board Election, 1994: Sai Wan Ho
Party	Candidate	Votes	%	±%
Independent	Kong Chack-ho	863	48.2	
Independent	Yiu Lan-ying	480	26.8	
Independent	Yiu Suet-fat	448	25.0	
Independent gain from Independent		Swing		

Eastern District Board Election, 1991: Sai Wan Ho
Party	Candidate	Votes	%	±%
Independent	Alexander Fu Yuen-cheung	1,686	67.5	+13.4
LDF	Chan Kai-wing	810	32.5	
Independent hold		Swing		

=== 1980s ===
Eastern District Board Election, 1988: Sai Wan Ho
Party	Candidate	Votes	%	±%
Independent	Alexander Fu Yuen-cheung	586	54.1	
Independent	Cheung Kin-chung	498	45.9	–25.9
Independent gain from Independent		Swing		

Eastern District Board Election, 1985: Sai Wan Ho
Party	Candidate	Votes	%	±%
Civic	Cheung Kin-chung	2,435	71.8	+11.0
Reform	Lee King-wah	958	28.2	
Civic hold		Swing		

Eastern District Board Election, 1982: Sai Wan Ho
Party	Candidate	Votes	%	±%
Civic	Cheung Kin-chung	1,238	60.8	
Independent	Chiu Chi-fai	565	27.8	
Independent	Ng Ping-sun	232	11.4	
Civic win (new seat)				
