= Tseung Kwan O Pioneers =

Tseung Kwan O Pioneers 將軍澳青年力量
- Convenor: Chan Wai-lit
- Founded: 10 March 2016
- Ideology: Hong Kong localism Liberalism (Hong Kong)
- Regional affiliation: Pro-democracy camp
- Colours: Red
- Legislative Council: 0 / 90
- Sai Kung District Council: 0 / 32

Tseung Kwan O Pioneers (Chinese: 將軍澳青年力量) is a local political group based in Tseung Kwan O founded in 2016. In a historic pro-democracy landslide in the 2019 District Council election, the group won two seats in the Sai Kung District Council.

== History ==
Tseung Kwan O Pioneers was founded in March 2016 by three young Tseung Kwan O residents, Chan Wai-lit, Cheung Fung-kiu and Cheung Wai-chiu, who, inspired by the Umbrella Revolution, aimed to provide community services in Choi Kin, Fu Nam and King Lam, respectively.

The Pioneers clashed with other pro-democracy parties in those districts. While Cheung Fung-kiu did not run eventually, Chan Wai-lit and Cheung Wai-chiu failed to coordinate with other pro-democratic candidates which resulted in more than one pro-democrat running in those constituencies. However, both Chan and Cheung were elected with the majority of votes in Choi Kin and King Lam.

== Performance in elections ==
=== Sai Kung District Council elections ===
Election	Number of popular votes	% of popular votes	Total elected seats	+/−
2019	8,989	4.51	2 / 29	2▲
