= Kin Ming Estate =

Public housing estate in Tseung Kwan O, Hong Kong

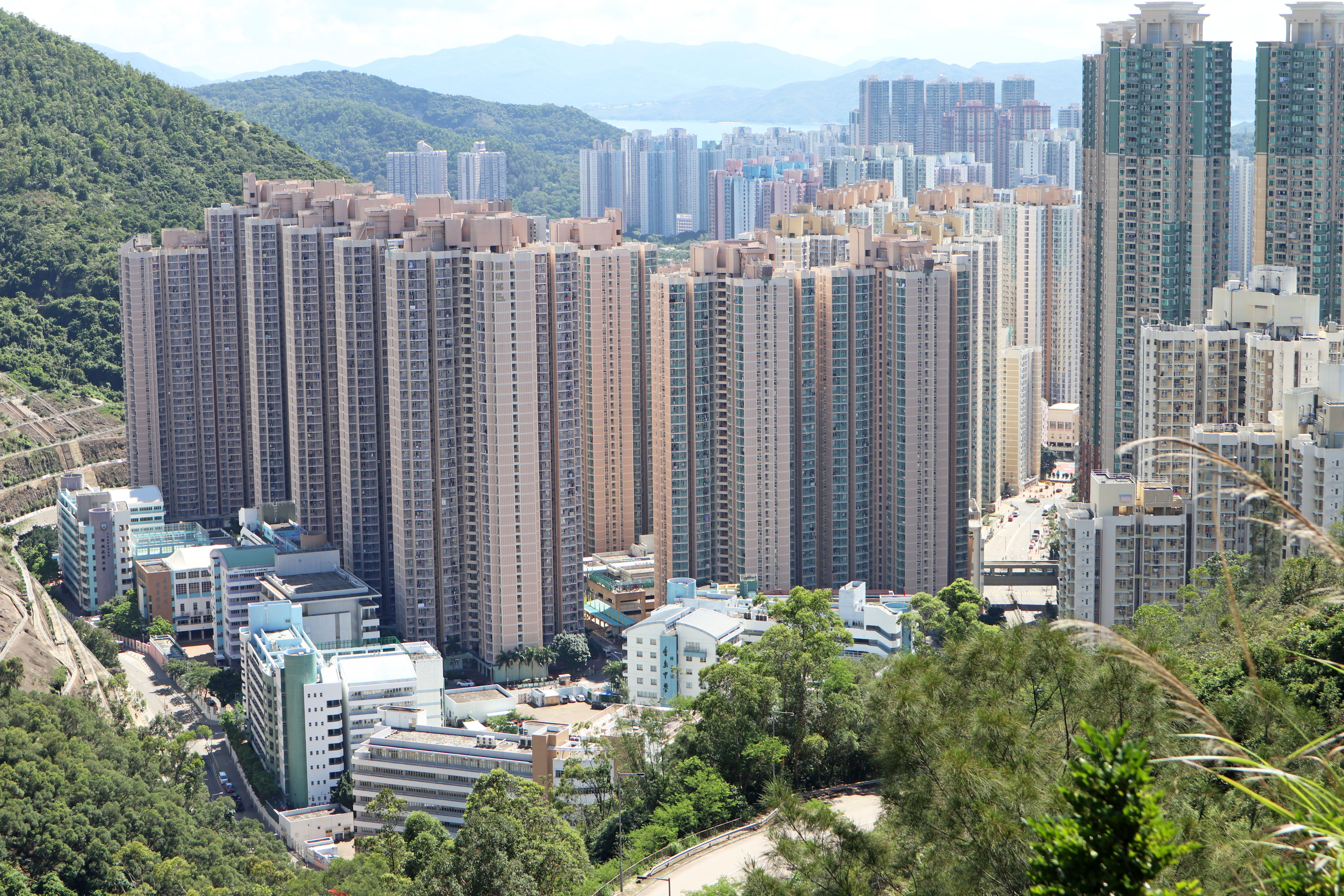
- Interactive map of Kin Ming Estate

General information
- Location: 7, 9, 15, 17, Ling Kwong Street; 3, 5, 7, 9, 10, 12 Kan Hok Lane; Tseung Kwan O New Territories, Hong Kong
- Coordinates: 22.3064052°N 114.2502442°E
- Status: Completed
- Category: Public rental housing
- Population: 19,889 (2016)
- No. of blocks: 10
- No. of units: 7,018

Construction
- Constructed: 2003; 23 years ago
- Authority: Hong Kong Housing Authority

Kin Ming Estate (Chinese: 健明邨) is a public housing estate in Tiu Keng Leng, Tseung Kwan O, New Territories, Hong Kong, near MTR Tiu Keng Leng station. It is the eighth public housing estate in Tseung Kwan O and consists of ten housing blocks completed in 2003.

== Background ==
Kin Ming Estate was formerly the site of Tiu Keng Leng Cottage Area, an area settled by Kuomintang Army in Hong Kong after Chinese Civil War ended in 1949. After the area was demolished in 1997, a massive clearance, reclamation and redevelopment programme was carried out. The Tiu Keng Leng slope was flattened into two huge platforms to construct Kin Ming Estate and Choi Ming Court on the reclaimed land afterwards.

Kin Ming Estate was originally a HOS court called Kin Ming Court (健明苑), but it was changed to rental housing finally and renamed to the current name.

== Houses ==
Name	Chinese name	Building type	Completed
Kin Ching House	健晴樓	New Harmony I Option 7	2003
Kin Wa House	健華樓	New Harmony I Option 7	2003
Kin Hei House	健曦樓	New Harmony I Option 7	2003
Kin Fai House	健暉樓	New Harmony Annex Type 5	2003
Ming Yuet House	明月樓	New Harmony Annex Type 5	2003
Ming Chau House	明宙樓	New Harmony 1 Option 5	2003
Ming Sing House	明星樓	New Harmony 1 Option 5	2003
Ming Wik House	明域樓	New Harmony 1 Option 5	2003
Ming Yu House	明宇樓	New Harmony 1 Option 5	2003
Ming Yat House	明日樓	New Harmony 1 Option 7	2003

== Demographics ==
According to the 2016 by-census, Kin Ming Estate had a population of 19,889. The median age was 42.8 and the majority of residents (96.7 per cent) were of Chinese ethnicity. The average household size was 2.9 people. The median monthly household income of all households (i.e. including both economically active and inactive households) was HK$21,250.

== Politics ==
For the 2019 District Council election, the estate fell within two constituencies. Most of the estate falls within the Kin Ming constituency, which was represented by Leung Li until May 2021, while the remainder falls within the Choi Kin constituency, which is represented by Chan Wai-lit.

== See also ==
- Public housing estates in Tseung Kwan O
