= To Kwa Wan South (constituency) =

Hong Kong constituency

- 土瓜灣南
- Elected constituency for the Kowloon City District Council
- Boundary of To Kwa Wan South in Kowloon City District
- District: Kowloon City
- Legislative Council constituency: Kowloon Central
- Population: 15,646 (2019)
- Electorate: 5,665 (2019)

Current constituency
- Created: 1982 (first time); 1999 (second time)
- Number of members: One
- Member: Vacant

To Kwa Wan South (Chinese: 土瓜灣南) is one of the 25 constituencies in the Kowloon City District of Hong Kong which was created in 1991.

The constituency has an estimated population of 15,646.

== Councillors represented ==
=== 1982 to 1985 ===
Election	Member	Party
1982	Kong Pak-keung	Nonpartisan

=== 1985 to 1991 ===
Election	First Member	First Party	Second Member	Second Party
1985	Kong Pak-keung	Nonpartisan	Tang Po-hong	Nonpartisan
1988	Pao Ping-wing	PHKS	Tang Po-hong	Nonpartisan
1990	Pao Ping-wing	LDF	Tang Po-hong	Nonpartisan
1991	Constituency abolished			

=== 1999 to present ===
Election	Member	Party
1999	Man Tak-chuen	Democratic
2007	Poon Chi-man	Democratic
2015	Jimmy Lam Pok	Independent
2019	Timothy Lee Hin-long→Vacant (Note: Resigned on 24 March 2021.)	Synergy Kowloon

== Election results ==
=== 2010s ===
Kowloon City District Council Election, 2019: To Kwa Wan South
Party	Candidate	Votes	%	±%
Democratic Coalition	Timothy Lee Hin-long	1,936	50.83	
Independent	Jimmy Lam Pok	1,766	46.36	
Ind. democrat	Wong Yi-ting	107	2.81	
Majority		170	4.47	
Turnout		3,824	67.54	
Democratic Coalition gain from Independent		Swing		
