= Sai Kung Central (constituency) =

Constituency of the Sai Kung District Council of Hong Kong

- Elected constituency for the Sai Kung District Council
- Boundary of Sai Kung Central in Sai Kung District
- District: Sai Kung
- Legislative Council constituency: New Territories South East
- Population: 10,901 (2019)
- Electorate: 6,822 (2019)

Current constituency
- Created: 1982
- Number of members: One
- Member(s): vacant

Sai Kung Central is one of the 29 constituencies in the Sai Kung District.

The constituency returns one district councillor to the Sai Kung District Council, with an election every four years.

Sai Kung Central constituency is loosely based on town centre in Sai Kung with estimated population of 10,901 as of 2019.

The boundaries of the constituency are Tai Mong Tsai Road, Hiram's Highway and Po Tung Road on the north and west.

== Councillors represented ==
Election	Member	Party
1982	Chan Muk-sang	Nonpartisan
1985	Ho Kwun-shun	Nonpartisan
1994	Ng Sze-fuk	Progressive Alliance
2005	Ng Sze-fuk	DAB
2019	Zoe Leung Hin-yan→Vacant	Sai Kung Commons

== Election results ==
=== 2010s ===
Sai Kung District Council Election, 2019: Sai Kung Central
Party	Candidate	Votes	%	±%
Sai Kung Commons (PfD)	Zoe Leung Hin-yan	2,550	54.41	
DAB	Ng Sze-fuk	2,137	45.59	
Majority		413	8.82	
Turnout		4,719	69.18	
Sai Kung Commons gain from DAB		Swing		
