= Mong Kok North (constituency) =

Constituency in Yau Tsim Mong, Hong Kong

- Elected constituency for the Yau Tsim Mong District Council
- Boundary of Mong Kok North in Yau Tsim Mong District
- District: Mong Kok (1982–1994); Yau Tsim Mong (1994–present)
- Legislative Council constituency: Kowloon West
- Population: 18,871 (2019)
- Electorate: 6,591 (2019)

Current constituency
- Created: 1982
- Number of members: One
- Member(s): vacant

Mong Kok North (Chinese: 旺角北) is one of the 20 constituencies in the Yau Tsim Mong District. The constituency returns one district councillor to the Yau Tsim Mong District Council, with an election every four years.

== Councillors represented ==
=== 1982–85 ===
Election	Member	Party
1982	Ho Fei-chi	Independent

=== 1985–94 ===
Election	First Member	First Party	Second Member	Second Party
1985	Ho Fei-chi	Independent	Wong Chi-ming	Independent
1991	Ho Fei-chi	Independent	Wong Chi-ming	Citizen Forum

=== 1994 to present ===
Election	Member	Party
1994	Stanley Ng Wing-fai	Democratic
1999	Ip Shu-on	Democratic
2007	Rowena Wong Shu-ming	Independent
2011	Rowena Wong Shu-ming	KWND
2016	Rowena Wong Shu-ming	BPA/KWND
2019	Lucifer Siu Tak-kin→vacant	Nonpartisan

== Election results ==
=== 2010s ===
Yau Tsim Mong District Council Election, 2019: Mong Kok North
Party	Candidate	Votes	%	±%
Nonpartisan	Lucifer Siu Tak-kin	2,161	51.00	
BPA (KWND)	Wong Shu-ming	2,076	49.00	
Majority		85	2.00	
Turnout		4,257	64.63	
Nonpartisan gain from BPA		Swing		
