= Mong Kok South (constituency) =

- Elected constituency for the Yau Tsim Mong District Council
- Boundary of Mong Kok South in Yau Tsim Mong District
- District: Mong Kok (1982–1994); Yau Tsim Mong (1994–present)
- Legislative Council constituency: Kowloon West
- Population: 16,846 (2019)
- Electorate: 5,819 (2019)

Current constituency
- Created: 1982
- Number of members: One
- Member(s): vacant

Mong Kok South (Chinese: 旺角南) is one of the 20 constituencies in the Yau Tsim Mong District. The constituency returns one district councillor to the Yau Tsim Mong District Council, with an election every four years.

== Councillors represented ==
=== 1982 to 1985 ===
Election	Member	Party
1982	Jackie Chan Chai-keung	Independent

=== 1985 to 1994 ===
Election	First Member	First Party	Second Member	Second Party
1985	Jackie Chan Chai-keung	Independent	Chow Chun-fai	Independent
1990	Jackie Chan Chai-keung	LDF	Chow Chun-fai	Independent

=== 1994 to present ===
Election	Member	Party
1994	Chow Chun-fai	Independent
2019	Chu Kong-wai→vacant	Community March

== Election results ==
=== 2010s ===
Yau Tsim Mong District Council Election, 2019: Mong Kok South
Party	Candidate	Votes	%	±%
Community March	Chu Kong-wai	1,977	53.09	
Nonpartisan	Chow Chun-fai	1,747	46.91	
Majority		130	6.18	
Turnout		3,726	64.06	
Community March gain from Nonpartisan		Swing		
