= Lok Fu (constituency) =

- 樂富
- Elected constituency for the Wong Tai Sin District Council
- Boundary of Lok Fu in Wong Tai Sin District
- District: Wong Tai Sin
- Legislative Council constituency: Kowloon Central
- Population: 14,016 (2019)
- Electorate: 9,209 (2019)

Current constituency
- Created: 1982 (first time); 1999 (second time)
- Number of members: One
- Member: (Vacant)

Lok Fu
- Traditional Chinese: 樂富
Transcriptions
Yue: Cantonese
- Yale Romanization: Lohk fu
- Jyutping: Lok6 fu3

Lok Fu is one of the 25 constituencies in the Wong Tai Sin District in Hong Kong. The constituency returns one district councillor to the Wong Tai Sin District Council, with an election every four years.

The constituency has an estimated population of 14,016.

== Councillors represented ==
Election	Member	Party
1982	Wong Kan-fong	Independent
1985	Wong Chung-chuen	Independent
1991	Constituency abolished	
1999	Lo Chiu-fai	Frontier
2003	Andie Chan Wai-kwan	Independent
2019	Steve Leung Ming-hong→vacant	Independent

== Election results ==
=== 2010s ===
Wong Tai Sin District Council Election, 2019: Lok Fu
Party	Candidate	Votes	%	±%
Independent	Leung Ming-hong	3,451	55.53	
Nonpartisan	Andie Chan Wai-kwan	2,764	44.47	
Majority		687	11.06	
Turnout		6,242	67.82	
Independent gain from Nonpartisan		Swing		
