= Sai Kung Commons =

Sai Kung Commons 西貢鄉民
- Founded: 2019
- Ideology: Liberalism (Hong Kong)
- Regional affiliation: Pro-democracy camp
- Colours: Green
- Legislative Council: 0 / 90
- Sai Kung District Council: 0 / 32

Website
- Official Facebook page

Sai Kung Commons (Chinese: 西貢鄉民) is a local political group based in Sai Kung founded in 2016. In a historic pro-democracy landslide in 2019 District Council election, the group won three seats in the Sai Kung District Council.

== History ==
Sai Kung Commons was founded in 2019 by a group of activists who were concerned about development in Sai Kung and rural living and aimed at breaking the monopoly of District Councillors who were biased in favour of the property developers with large scale residential projects destroying the rural nature.

In the 2019 District Council election, the group filled three candidates in the Sai Kung rural constituencies, with Zoe Leung Hin-yan running in Sai Kung Central, Stanley Ho Wai-hong, who was also a Labour Party member, in Pak Sha Wan and Debby Chan Ka-lam in Sai Kung Islands. During the campaign, Stanley Ho was attacked by four rod-wielding white-clad men in Sai Kung. Zoe Leung Hin-yan's campaign volunteer was also attacked with excrement in November.

All three Commons members were eventually elected, defeating the pro-Beijing Democratic Alliance for the Betterment and Progress of Hong Kong (DAB) candidates including Sai Kung District Council chairman George Ng Sze-fuk in Sai Kung Central on 24 November.

== Performance in elections ==
=== Sai Kung District Council elections ===
Election	Number of popular votes	% of popular votes	Total elected seats	+/−
2019	7,482	2.55	3 / 29	3▲
