= Pak Sha Wan (constituency) =

Constituency of the Sai Kung District Council of Hong Kong

- Elected constituency for the Sai Kung District Council
- Boundary of Pak Sha Wan in Sai Kung District
- District: Sai Kung
- Legislative Council constituency: New Territories South East
- Population: 15,810 (2019)
- Electorate: 7,227 (2019)

Current constituency
- Created: 1982
- Number of members: One
- Member: vacant

Pak Sha Wan (Chinese: 白沙灣) is one of the 29 constituencies in the Sai Kung District.

The constituency returns one district councillor to the Sai Kung District Council, with an election every four years.

Pak Sha Wan constituency is loosely based on Pak Sha Wan with an estimated population of 15,810.

== Councillors represented ==
Election	Member	Party
1982	Lau Wang-hei	Nonpartisan
1985	Gilbert Leung Kam-ho	People's Association
198?	Gilbert Leung Kam-ho	Nonpartisan
1991	Wong Shui-sang	Nonpartisan
1994	Hiew Moo-siew	Progressive Alliance
2005	Hiew Moo-siew	DAB
2019	Stanley Ho Wai-hong→Vacant	Labour/Sai Kung Commons

== Election results ==
=== 2010s ===
Sai Kung District Council Election, 2019: Pak Sha Wan
Party	Candidate	Votes	%	±%
Labour (Sai Kung Commons)	Stanley Ho Wai-hong	2,805	57.08	
DAB	Chan Kuen-kwan	2,109	42.92	
Majority		696	14.16	
Turnout		4,931	68.28	
Labour gain from DAB		Swing		
