= Mong Kok West (constituency) =

- Elected constituency for the Yau Tsim Mong District Council
- Boundary of Mong Kok West in Yau Tsim Mong District
- District: Mong Kok (1982–1994); Yau Tsim Mong (1994–present)
- Legislative Council constituency: Kowloon West
- Population: 16,278 (2019)
- Electorate: 6,233 (2019)

Current constituency
- Created: 1982
- Number of members: One
- Member(s): Hui Tak-leung (Independent)

Mong Kok West (Chinese: 旺角西) is one of the 19 constituencies in the Yau Tsim Mong District of Hong Kong. The constituency returns one district councillor to the Yau Tsim Mong District Council, with an election every four years.

== Councillors represented ==
=== 1982 to 1985 ===
Election	Member	Party
1982	Chan Hon-chung	Independent

=== 1985 to 1994 ===
Election	First Member	First Party	Second Member	Second Party
1985	Sham Tak-on	Reform Club	Ip Kam-chiu	Independent
198?	Sham Tak-on	Independent	Ip Kam-chiu	Independent

=== 1994 to present ===
Election	Member	Party
1994	Chun Fei-pang	123 Democratic Alliance
2003	Hui Tak-leung	ADPL
2007	Hui Tak-leung	Independent

== Election results ==
=== 2010s ===
Yau Tsim Mong District Council Election, 2019: Mong Kok West
Party	Candidate	Votes	%	±%
Nonpartisan	Hui Tak-leung	2,102	54.05	
Ind. democrat	Chan Yuen-pan	1,787	45.95	
Majority		315	8.10	
Turnout		3,902	62.72	
Nonpartisan hold		Swing		
