= Lamma & Po Toi (constituency) =

Lamma and Po Toi
- Elected constituency for the Islands District Council
- Boundary of Lamma and Po Toi in Islands District
- District: Islands
- Legislative Council constituency: Hong Kong Island West
- Population: 6,501 (2019)
- Electorate: 2,687 (2019)

Current constituency
- Created: 1982
- Number of members: One
- Member(s): Lau Shun-ting (DAB)

Lamma & Po Toi (Chinese: 南丫及蒲台) is one of the 10 constituencies in the Islands District in Hong Kong. It covers Lamma Island and Po Toi Islands.

The constituency returns one district councillor to the Islands District Council, with an election every four years.

Lamma and Po Toi constituency has an estimated population of 6,501.

== Councillors represented ==
Election	Member	Party
1982	Chow Choi-kwai	Nonpartisan
1994	Fong Kam-hung	Nonpartisan
2003	Yu Lai-fan	DAB
2019	Lau Shun-ting	DAB

== Election results ==
=== 2010s ===
Islands District Council Election, 2019: Lamma & Po Toi
Party	Candidate	Votes	%	±%
DAB	Lau Shun-ting	1,003	50.78	
PfD	Caan Chui Jing-ching	972	49.22	
Majority		31	1.56	
Turnout		1,985	73.90	
DAB hold		Swing		
