= Shing Hong (constituency) =

Hong Kong constituency

- Elected constituency for the Kwai Tsing District Council
- Boundary of Shing Hong in Kwai Tsing District
- District: Kwai Tsing
- Legislative Council constituency: New Territories South West
- Population: 14,902 (2019)
- Electorate: 10,194 (2019)

Current constituency
- Created: 1994
- Number of members: One
- Member: Leung Kar-ming (DAB)

Shing Hong (Chinese: 盛康) is one of the 31 constituencies of the Kwai Tsing District Council in Hong Kong. The seat elects one member of the council every four years. It was first created in the 1994 elections. Its boundary is loosely based on part of Cheung Hong Estate and Ching Shing Court in Tsing Yi with estimated population of 14,902.

== Councillors represented ==
| Election | Member | Party |
|---|---|---|
| 1994 | Cheuk Choi-fung | ADPL/TYCG |
| 1999 | Leung Wai-man | DAB |
| 2019 | Leung Kar-ming | DAB |

== Election results ==
=== 2010s ===
Kwai Tsing District Council Election, 2019: Shing Hong
| Party | Candidate | Votes | % | ±% |
|---|---|---|---|---|
| DAB | Leung Kar-ming | 3,531 | 50.82 | |
| Democratic Alliance | Lucia Chiu Po-kam | 3,417 | 49.18 | |
| Majority | | 114 | 1.64 | |
| Turnout | | 6,981 | 68.52 | |
| DAB hold | | Swing | | |
