= Zachary Wong =

Hong Kong politician (born 1957)

Zachary Wong Wai-yin 黃偉賢

Member of the Yuen Long District Council
- In office 1988 – 21 October 2021
- Constituency: Nam Ping

Member of the Legislative Council
- In office 10 December 1991 – 31 July 1995
- Preceded by: Tai Chin-wah
- Constituency: New Territories West
- In office 11 October 1995 – 30 June 1997
- Constituency: New Territories North-west

Personal details
- Born: 22 December 1957 (age 68) Hong Kong
- Party: Meeting Point (1988–1994); Democratic Party (1994–2025)
- Occupation: District Councillor

Zachary Wong Wai-yin (Chinese: 黃偉賢; born 22 December 1957, Hong Kong) is a former Yuen Long District Councillor (representing Nam Ping) for the Meeting Point and later Democratic Party and a former member of the Legislative Council of Hong Kong.

He joined the Association for the Rights of the Elderly, founded by Yeung Sum and Frederick Fung, in 1982. He was elected chairman of the association in 1991. In 1988, he joined Meeting Point and became a member of its Central Committee in 1991. He was also part of the Joint Committee on the Promotion of Democratic Government. He organised most of the rallies, petitions and 50-hour fasting strike at the Star Ferry Pier in 1989 for a faster pace of democracy.

He was first elected to the Yuen Long District Board in 1988 and replaced Tai Chin-wah as a LegCo member in a by-election in 1991. He stood in the Legislative Council elections in 1998 and again in 2012 but did not get elected.

In 2020, Wong became chairman of the Yuen Long District Council, after the pro-Beijing DAB was defeated in the 2019 Hong Kong local elections.

On 21 October 2021, Wong was unseated from his position both member and chairman of Yuen Long District Council, after he was disqualified together with 16 other members of the same council for being deemed by the Hong Kong SAR Government to have not fulfilled its requirements for taking the oath of allegiance upon taking office under the Public Offices (Candidacy and Taking Up Offices) (Miscellaneous Amendments) Ordinance 2021 - which it introduced into and was passed by the Legislative Council in the first half of 2021 and covers all members of every District Council in addition to legislative councillors and other major public office holders.

Political offices
New constituency	Member of Yuen Long District Council; Representative for Nam Ping; 1994–2021	Vacant
Preceded by Shum Ho-kit	Chairman of Yuen Long District Council; 2020–2021	Succeeded by Shum Ho-kit
