= Laguna City (constituency) =

Hong Kong constituency

- 麗港城
- Elected constituency for the Kwun Tong District Council
- Boundary of Laguna City in Kwun Tong District
- District: Kwun Tong
- Legislative Council constituency: Kowloon East
- Population: 24,757 (2019)
- Electorate: 13,239 (2019)

Current constituency
- Created: 1991
- Number of members: One
- Member: William Li Wai-lam (Independent)

Laguna City
- Traditional Chinese: 麗港城
Transcriptions
Yue: Cantonese
- Yale Romanization: Laih góng sìhng
- Jyutping: Lai6 gong2 sing4

Laguna City is one of the 40 constituencies in the Kwun Tong District of Hong Kong. It was created in 1991.

The constituency has an estimated population of 24,757. It is based on Laguna City, a large-scale private housing estate in Sai Tso Wan near Cha Kwo Ling.

== Councillors represented ==
Election	Member	Party
1994	Lui Chi-wah	Liberal
1999	Chin Ching-man	Democratic
2003	Chin Ching-man	Democratic
2007	Tang Wing-chun	Independent (New Century Forum)
2011	Tang Wing-chun	Independent (New Century Forum)
2015	Tang Wing-chun	Independent (New Century Forum)
2019	William Li Wai-lam	Civic→Independent

== Election results ==
=== 2010s ===
Kwun Tong District Council Election, 2019: Laguna City
Party	Candidate	Votes	%	±%
Civic	William Li Wai-lam	6,450	62.01	
Independent	Tang Wing-chun	3,951	37.99	
Majority		2,499	24.02	
Turnout		10,463	79.04	
Civic gain from Independent		Swing		
