= Kin Ming (constituency) =

Constituency of the Sai Kung District Council of Hong Kong

- Elected constituency for the Sai Kung District Council
- Boundary of Kin Ming in Sai Kung District
- District: Sai Kung
- Legislative Council constituency: New Territories South East
- Population: 15,377 (2019)
- Electorate: 10,183 (2019)

Current constituency
- Created: 2007
- Number of members: One
- Member: Vacant
- Created from: Kin Choi

Kin Ming (Chinese: 健明), previously called Kin Shin from 2011 to 2015, is one of the 24 constituencies of the Sai Kung District Council in Hong Kong. The seat elects one member of the council every four years.

Since its creation in 2007, the boundary of the constituency is loosely based on part of Kin Ming Estate in Tiu King Leng.

== Councillors represented ==
Election	Member	Party
2007	Leung Li	Democratic→Neo Democrats
2011	Leung Li	Neo Democrats
2015	Leung Li	Neo Democrats
2019	Leung Li→Vacant (Note: Resigned on 31 May 2021 over new oath-taking law.)	Neo Democrats→Independent

== Election results ==
=== 2010s ===
Sai Kung District Council Election, 2019: Kin Ming
Party	Candidate	Votes	%	±%
Neo Democrats	Leung Li	5,414	73.49	+10.48
DAB	Rocco Ho Pok-ho	1,953	26.51	−10.48
Majority		3,461	45.98	
Turnout		7,379	72.55	
Neo Democrats hold		Swing		

Sai Kung District Council Election, 2015: Kin Ming
Party	Candidate	Votes	%	±%
Neo Democrats	Leung Li	3,719	83.97	+3.32
DAB	Chau Ka-lok	710	16.03	
Majority		3,009	67.94	
Turnout		4,429	55.09	
Neo Democrats hold		Swing		

Sai Kung District Council Election, 2011: Kin Shin
Party	Candidate	Votes	%	±%
Neo Democrats	Leung Li	3,096	80.65	+43.75
Civil Force	Li Chun-ho	482	32.44	−19.88
Nonpartisan	Adam Wong Ping-hung	136	3.54	
Independent	Wong Yan-ket	125	3.26	
Majority		2,614	68.09	
Turnout		3,839	50.96	
Neo Democrats hold		Swing		

=== 2000s ===
Sai Kung District Council Election, 2007: Kin Ming
Party	Candidate	Votes	%	±%
Democratic	Leung Li	969	36.90	
Civil Force	Ng Wai-sing	852	32.44	
Independent	Wong Man-kit	805	30.65	
Majority		117	4.46	
Democratic win (new seat)				
