= Bernard Chan Pak-li =

Hong Kong politician

- 陳百里
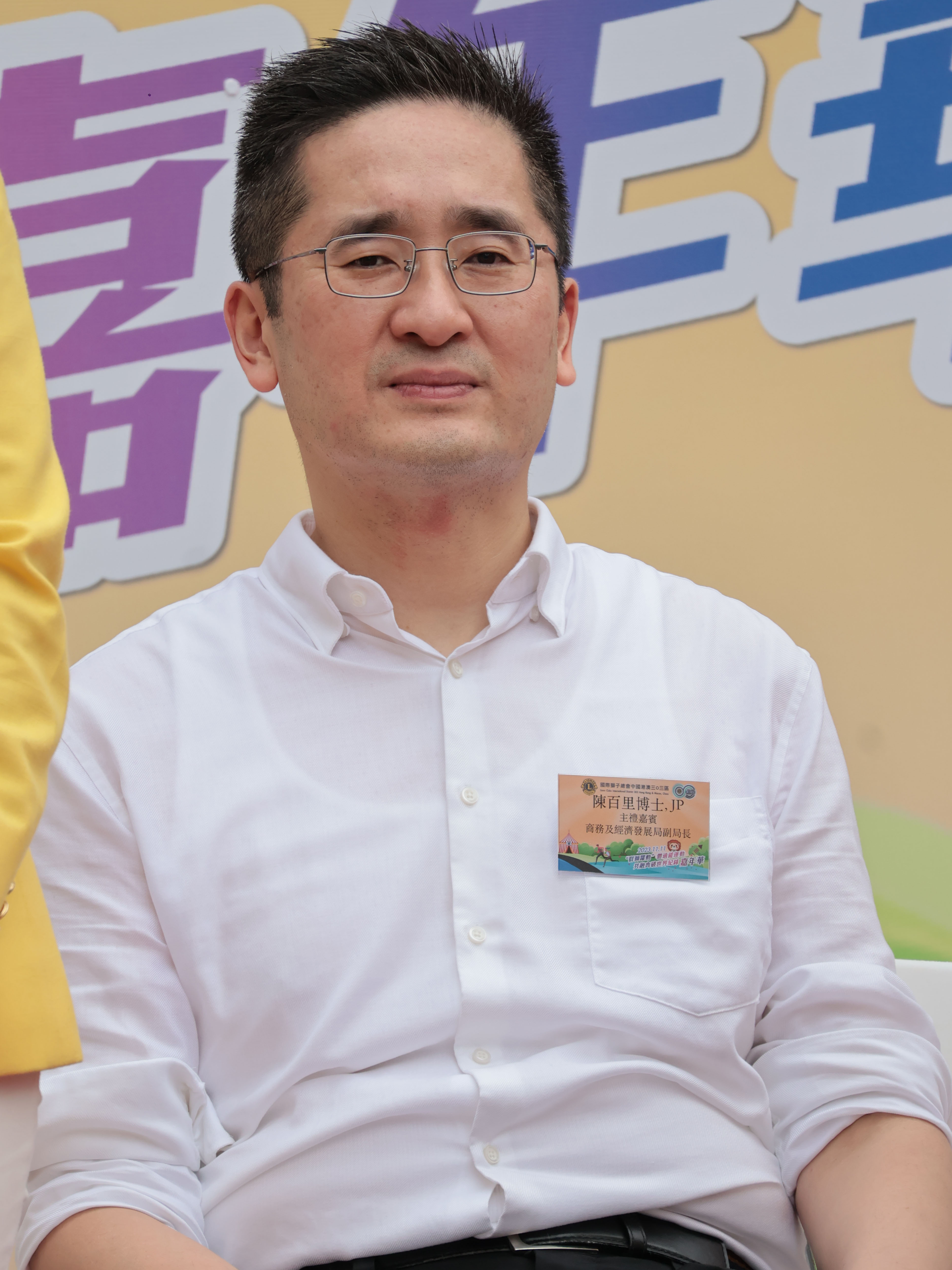
- Citizenship: People's Republic of China
- Education: La Salle College; Duke University (Ph.D.)

Bernard Chan Pak-li (traditional Chinese: 陳百里; simplified Chinese: 陈百里, born 1976) is a Hong Kong politician with the Democratic Alliance for the Betterment and Progress of Hong Kong. Outside politics he is involved in the pharmaceuticals industry.

== Scientific career ==
In November 2004, Chan became the director of research and development at the LifeTec Group (SEHK: 1180), a pharmaceutical company which developed recombinant protein drugs for the treatment of liver disease. In 2006, he and his friends co-founded Comprehensive Drug Enterprises, which would go on to win the Hong Kong Award for Industries' Technological Achievement Award in 2007.

Chan is also a member of the Hong Kong Biotechnology Organization's Executive Council.

== In politics ==
Chan first ran for public office in the 2007 local elections for Kwun Tong District Council to represent Ping Shek. With the help of film director Raymond Wong — the father of his then-girlfriend Alvina Wong Yee-kwan (黃漪鈞) — in canvassing the district, Chan was able to receive 62.9% of votes cast, defeating Yun Kwun-wai of the Civic Party and two independent candidates in a landslide to succeed fellow DAB member Chan Kam-lam in the Ping Shek seat. He was returned to the same seat in the 2011 elections with an even larger margin of victory, receiving 77.2% of votes cast to defeat Lam Sum-shing of the League of Social Democrats.

In February 2013, Chan was nominated by the Secretary for Commerce and Economic Development to become the political assistant for the Commerce and Economic Development Bureau, and renounced his U.S. citizenship.

He resigned from the Kwun Tong District Council to take up the post, triggering a by-election. Chan Kam-lam of the DAB stated that the party respected his decision and had no intention of blocking party members from resigning to serve the public in other fields, and that there were ongoing internal discussions in the DAB about whether or not to field a candidate in the resulting by-election.

== Personal life ==
Chan's father Chan Chung-nam (陳宗南) is an energy businessman in mainland China and a member of the Standing Committee of the Zhanjiang People's Political Consultative Conference. Chan himself graduated from Hong Kong's La Salle College in 1993, and went on to receive a PhD from Duke University in Durham, North Carolina in 2003. He married Michelle Li (李淑媛), originally of Xinyang, Henan in mainland China, in February 2014; the two met at a technology event in 2010.

Political offices
Preceded by Chan Kam-lam	Member of Kwun Tong District Council; Representative for Ping Shek; 2008–2013	Succeeded by Chan Chun-kit
New title	Political Assistant to Secretary for Commerce and Economic Development; 2013–2017	Succeeded by Elizabeth Fung
Preceded by Godfrey Leung	Under Secretary for Commerce and Economic Development; 2017–present	Incumbent
