= Mei Foo Central (constituency) =

- Elected constituency for the Sham Shui Po District Council
- Boundary of Mei Foo Central in Sham Shui Po District
- District: Sham Shui Po
- Legislative Council constituency: Kowloon West
- Population: 12,720 (2019)
- Electorate: 8,011 (2019)

Current constituency
- Created: 2003
- Number of members: One
- Member: Ng Yuet-lan (Independent)

Mei Foo Central (Chinese: 美孚中), formerly called Lai Wan, is one of the 25 constituencies in the Sham Shui Po District of Hong Kong.

The constituency returns one district councillor to the Sham Shui Po District Council, with an election every four years. The seat is currently held by independent Ng Yuet-lan, who was previously part of the Civic Party.

Mei Foo Central constituency is loosely based on the middle part of the Mei Foo Sun Chuen in Lai Chi Kok and has an estimated population of 12,720.

== Councillors represented ==
Election	Member	Party
2003	Tam Kwok-hung	Nonpartisan
200?	Tam Kwok-hung	ADPL
2007	Shum Siu-hung	Nonpartisan
2015	Ng Yuet-lan	Civic
2020	Ng Yuet-lan	Independent

== Election results ==
=== 2010s ===
Sham Shui Po District Council Election, 2019: Mei Foo Central
Party	Candidate	Votes	%	±%
Civic	Ng Yuet-lan	3,666	60.14	+8.34
NPP	Issac Yip Pui-man	2,430	39.86	
Majority		1,236	20.28	
Turnout		6,121	76.41	
Civic hold		Swing		

Sham Shui Po District Council Election, 2015: Mei Foo Central
Party	Candidate	Votes	%	±%
Civic	Ng Yuet-lan	1,803	51.8	+23.6
Nonpartisan	Shum Siu-hung	1,675	48.2	–8.7
Majority		128	3.6	
Turnout		3,782	51.6	
Civic gain from Nonpartisan		Swing	+16.2	

Sham Shui Po District Council Election, 2011: Mei Foo Central
Party	Candidate	Votes	%	±%
Nonpartisan	Shum Siu-hung	1,812	56.9	+27.1
Civic	Ng Yuet-lan	899	28.2	
People Power	Judey Tzeng Li-wen	476	14.9	
Majority		913	28.7	
Nonpartisan hold		Swing		

=== 2000s ===
Sham Shui Po District Council Election, 2007: Mei Foo Central
Party	Candidate	Votes	%	±%
Nonpartisan	Shum Siu-hung	998	38.8	+6.5
ADPL	Tam Kwok-hung	851	33.1	–0.3
Nonpartisan	David Yam Siu-wai	517	20.1	
Nonpartisan	Chung Bing-fu	205	8.0	
Nonpartisan gain from ADPL		Swing	+3.4	

Sham Shui Po District Council Election, 2003: Mei Foo Central
Party	Candidate	Votes	%	±%
Nonpartisan	Tam Kwok-hung	959	33.4	
Nonpartisan	Shum Siu-hung	928	32.3	
Nonpartisan	Ng Yuet-lan	692	24.1	
Nonpartisan win (new seat)				
