= Joe Lai =

Hong Kong politician

Joe Lai Wing-ho
- 黎榮浩

Member of the Wong Tai Sin District Council
- In office 1 January 2000 – 1 January 2020
- Preceded by: Wong Yuk-fun
- Succeeded by: Carmen Lau Ka-man
- Constituency: Wang Tau Hom

Personal details
- Born: 1973 (age 52–53) British Hong Kong
- Party: Democratic Alliance for the Betterment and Progress of Hong Kong
- Education: Hong Kong Baptist University

Joe Lai Wing-ho (Chinese: 黎榮浩; born 1973) is a Hong Kong politician. He is a former vice chairman of the Wong Tai Sin District Council for Wang Tau Hom and current deputy secretary-general of the Democratic Alliance for the Betterment and Progress of Hong Kong.

== Biography ==
Lai was educated at the Hong Kong Baptist University where he was a captain of the university's rowing team. He was named the best newcoming athlete by the Hong Kong Amateur Rowing Association in 1995.

He first contested in the 1999 District Council elections in Wang Tau Hom against Bruce Liu of the Hong Kong Association for Democracy and People's Livelihood (ADPL). He was elected with 2,122 votes, compared to Liu's 1,829. He was re-elected in 2003, 2007, 2011 and 2015 until he was defeated by Civic Party's Carmen Lau Ka-man in the 2019 District Council elections in the city-wide pro-democracy landslide.

From 2016 to 2019, Lai was the vice chairman of the Wong Tai Sin District Council. He was also appointed member of the Administrative Appeals Board and Hong Kong Consumer Council.

Lai ran in the Legislative Council elections in 2008, 2012 and 2016 with the DAB ticket as a minor candidate in Kowloon East, successfully helped Chan Kam-lam and Wilson Or to be elected to the legislature respectively. In the 2020 Legislative Council election after incumbent Wilson Or abruptly decided not to seek for re-election, Lai was nominated by the DAB to succeed Or in Kowloon East.

Political offices
Preceded by Wong Yuk-fun	Member of the Wong Tai Sin District Council; Representative for Wang Tau Hom; 2000–2019	Succeeded by Carmen Lau Ka-man
Preceded by Wong Kam-chiu	Vice Chairman of the Wong Tai Sin District Council; 2016–2019	Succeeded by Wong Yat-yuk
Party political offices
New title	Deputy Secretary-general of Democratic Alliance for the Betterment and Progress of Hong Kong; 2017–present	Incumbent
