= Choi Kin (constituency) =

Constituency of the Sai Kung District Council of Hong Kong

- Elected constituency for the Sai Kung District Council
- Boundary of Choi Kin in Sai Kung District
- District: Sai Kung
- Legislative Council constituency: New Territories South East
- Population: 19,778 (2019)
- Electorate: 12,208 (2019)

Current constituency
- Created: 2003
- Number of members: One
- Member: Vacant

Choi Kin (Chinese: 彩健) is one of the 29 constituencies in the Sai Kung District.

The constituency returns one district councillor to the Sai Kung District Council, with an election every four years.

Choi Kin constituency is loosely based on Choi Ming Court and part of Kin Ming Estate in Tiu Keng Leng with estimated population of 19,778.

== Councillors represented ==
Election	Member	Party
2003	Raymond Ho Man-kit	Nonpartisan
2019	Chan Wai-lit→Vacant	TKO Pioneers

== Election results ==
=== 2010s ===
Sai Kung District Council Election, 2019: Choi Kin
Party	Candidate	Votes	%	±%
TKO Pioneers	Chan Wai-lit	4,724	55.22	
Nonpartisan	Raymond Ho Man-kit	1,989	23.25	
DAB	Richie Tai Ka-chu	1,306	15.27	
Ind. democrat	Adam Wong Ping-hung	434	5.07	
Independent	Wong Yan-ket	88	1.03	
Majority		2,735	37.35	
Turnout		8,555	70.13	
TKO Pioneers gain from Nonpartisan		Swing		
