= Ap Lei Chau Estate (constituency) =

Constituency in the Southern District, Hong Kong

- Elected constituency for the Southern District Council
- Boundary of Ap Lei Chau Estate in Southern District
- District: Southern
- Legislative Council constituency: Hong Kong Island West
- Population: 12,062 (2019)
- Electorate: 8,929 (2019)

Current constituency
- Created: 1994
- Number of members: One
- Member: Lam Yuk-chun (Independent)

Ap Lei Chau Estate (Chinese: 鴨脷洲邨) is one of the 17 constituencies in the Southern District, Hong Kong. The constituency returns one district councillor to the Southern District Council, with an election every four years.

Ap Lei Chau Estate constituency has an estimated population of 13,210.

== Councillors represented ==
Election	Member	Party
1994	Andrew Cheng Kar-foo	Democratic
1999	Lam Yuk-chun	Independent

== Election results ==
=== 2010s ===
Southern District Council Election, 2019: Ap Lei Chau Estate
Party	Candidate	Votes	%	±%
Independent	Lam Yuk-chun	3,274	51.43	
Democratic	Chan Po-ming	3,092	48.57	
Majority		182	2.86	
Turnout		6,380	71.51	
Independent hold		Swing		

Southern District Council Election, 2015: Ap Lei Chau Estate
Party	Candidate	Votes	%	±%
Independent	Lam Yuk-chun	Uncontested		
Independent hold		Swing		

Southern District Council Election, 2011: Ap Lei Chau Estate
Party	Candidate	Votes	%	±%
Independent	Lam Yuk-chun	Uncontested		
Independent hold		Swing		

=== 2000s ===
Southern District Council Election, 2007: Ap Lei Chau Estate
Party	Candidate	Votes	%	±%
Independent	Lam Yuk-chun	3,031	84.41	
Independent	Leung Kwok-wah	560	15.59	
Majority		2,471	6.882	
Independent hold		Swing		

Southern District Council Election, 2003: Ap Lei Chau Estate
Party	Candidate	Votes	%	±%
Independent	Lam Yuk-chun	Uncontested		
Independent hold		Swing		

=== 1990s ===
Southern District Council Election, 1999: Lei Tung I
Party	Candidate	Votes	%	±%
Independent	Lam Yuk-chun	2,306	58.60	
Democratic	Leung Kwok-wah	1,204	30.60	−15.85
Independent	Leung Pak-hung	425	10.80	−1.31
Majority		1,102	18.00	
Independent gain from Democratic		Swing		

Southern District Board Election, 1994: Ap Lei Chau Estate
Party	Candidate	Votes	%	±%
Democratic	Andrew Cheng Kar-foo	1,630	46.45	
Public Affairs Society	Vivian Chih Wan-wan	1,454	41.44	
DAB	Leung Pak-hung	425	12.11	
Majority		176	4.99	
Democratic win (new seat)				
