= Cheung Hang (constituency) =

Hong Kong constituency

- Elected constituency for the Kwai Tsing District Council
- Boundary of Cheung Hang in Kwai Tsing District
- District: Kwai Tsing
- Legislative Council constituency: New Territories South West
- Population: 13,366 (2019)
- Electorate: 9,492 (2019)

Current constituency
- Created: 1999
- Number of members: One
- Member: Lo Yuen-ting (DAB)

Cheung Hang is one of the 29 constituencies of the Kwai Tsing District Council. The seat elects one member of the council every four years. It was first created in the 1999 elections. Its boundary is loosely based on the northwestern part of Tsing Yi including residential areas such as Cheung Hang Estate.

== Councillors represented ==
| Election | Member | Party |
|---|---|---|
| 1999 | Lui Ko-wai | Independent |
| 200? | Lui Ko-wai | Progressive Alliance |
| 2005 | Lui Ko-wai | DAB |
| 201? | Lui Ko-wai | Independent |
| 2011 | Lam Lap-chi | Democratic |
| 2015 | Lo Yuen-ting | DAB |

== Election results ==
=== 2010s ===
Kwai Tsing District Council Election, 2019: Cheung Hang
| Party | Candidate | Votes | % | ±% |
|---|---|---|---|---|
| DAB | Lo Yuen-ting | 3,759 | 53.48 | −2.97 |
| Civic Passion | Yim Ho-yuen | 3,270 | 46.52 | |
| Majority | | 489 | 6.96 | |
| Turnout | | 7,057 | 74.39 | |
| DAB hold | | Swing | | |

Kwai Tsing District Council Election, 2015: Cheung Hang
| Party | Candidate | Votes | % | ±% |
|---|---|---|---|---|
| DAB | Lo Yuen-ting | 2,814 | 56.45 | |
| Democratic | Lam Lap-chi | 1,838 | 36.87 | –11.21 |
| Independent | Ha Lung-wan | 168 | 3.37 | +0.82 |
| Independent | Lui Ko-wai | 165 | 3.31 | −37.98 |
| Majority | | 976 | 19.18 | |
| Turnout | | 4,985 | 56.38 | |
| DAB gain from Democratic | | Swing | | |

Kwai Tsing District Council Election, 2011: Cheung Hang
| Party | Candidate | Votes | % | ±% |
|---|---|---|---|---|
| Democratic | Lam Lap-chi | 1,828 | 48.08 | +5.16 |
| Independent | Lui Ko-wai | 1,569 | 41.27 | −27.96 |
| People Power | Lau Po-kwan | 308 | 8.10 | |
| Independent | Ha Lung-wan | 97 | 2.55 | |
| Majority | | 259 | 6.81 | |
| Turnout | | 3,802 | 43.18 | |
| Democratic gain from DAB | | Swing | +10.49 | |

=== 2000s ===
Kwai Tsing District Council Election, 2007: Cheung Hang
| Party | Candidate | Votes | % | ±% |
|---|---|---|---|---|
| DAB | Lui Ko-wai | 1,831 | 57.08 | −13.71 |
| Democratic | Fung Ka-kui | 1,377 | 42.92 | |
| Majority | | 454 | 14.16 | |
| DAB hold | | Swing | | |

Kwai Tsing District Council Election, 2003: Cheung Hang
| Party | Candidate | Votes | % | ±% |
|---|---|---|---|---|
| HKPA | Lui Ko-wai | 2,298 | 70.79 | +18.28 |
| Nonpartisan | Yeung Wai-leung | 948 | 29.21 | |
| Majority | | 1,350 | 41.58 | |
| HKPA hold | | Swing | | |

=== 1990s ===
Kwai Tsing District Council Election, 1999: Cheung Hang
| Party | Candidate | Votes | % | ±% |
|---|---|---|---|---|
| Nonpartisan | Lui Ko-wai | 1,571 | 52.51 | |
| Democratic | Chan Wai-man | 1,421 | 47.49 | |
| Majority | | 150 | 5.02 | |
| Nonpartisan win (new seat) | | | | |
