= King Lam (constituency) =

Constituency of the Sai Kung District Council of Hong Kong

- Elected constituency for the Sai Kung District Council
- Boundary of King Lam in Sai Kung District
- District: Sai Kung
- Legislative Council constituency: New Territories South East
- Population: 17,176 (2019)
- Electorate: 12,706 (2019)

Current constituency
- Created: 1994
- Number of members: One
- Member: Vacant

King Lam (Chinese: 景林) is one of the 29 constituencies in the Sai Kung District.

The constituency returns one district councillor to the Sai Kung District Council, with an election every four years.

King Lam constituency is loosely based on Ho Ming Court and King Lam Estate in Po Lam with estimated population of 17,176.

== Councillors represented ==
Election	Member	Party
1994	Lam Wing-yin	Democratic
2007	Ki Lai-mei	DAB
2011	Lam Wing-yin	Democratic
2015	Wan Kai-ming	DAB
2019	Cheung Wai-chiu→Vacant	TKO Pioneers

== Election results ==
=== 2010s ===
Sai Kung District Council Election, 2019: King Lam
Party	Candidate	Votes	%	±%
TKO Pioneers	Cheung Wai-chiu	4,265	51.48	
DAB	Wan Kai-ming	3,233	39.02	
Nonpartisan	Lam Wing-yin	788	9.51	
Majority		1,032	12.46	
Turnout		8,304	65.38	
TKO Pioneers gain from DAB		Swing		
