= Nam Ping (constituency) =

Hong Kong constituency

- Elected constituency for the Yuen Long District Council
- Boundary of Nam Ping in Yuen Long District
- District: Yuen Long
- Legislative Council constituency: New Territories North West
- Population: 13,508 (2019)
- Electorate: 9,012 (2019)

Current constituency
- Created: 1994
- Number of members: One
- Member: Vacant

Nam Ping (南屏) is one of the 31 constituencies in the Yuen Long District of Hong Kong. It is one of the districts created in 1994.

The constituency returns one district councillor to the Yuen Long District Council, with an election every four years. The seat was formerly held by Zachary Wong of the Democratic Party since its creation in the 1994 DB Election.

Nam Ping constituency is loosely based southern part of Long Ping Estate and around the Long Ping station with estimated population of 13,508.

== Councillors represented ==
| Election | Member | Party |
|---|---|---|
| 1994 | Zachary Wong Wai-yin→Vacant (Note: Disqualified on 21 October 2021.) | Democratic |

== Election results ==
=== 2010s ===
Yuen Long District Council Election, 2019: Nam Ping
| Party | Candidate | Votes | % | ±% |
|---|---|---|---|---|
| Democratic | Zachary Wong Wai-yin | 3,727 | 62.59 | −0.91 |
| DAB | Lam Wai-ming | 2,102 | 35.30 | +4.80 |
| Independent | Chan Wai-yi | 126 | 2.12 | −3.88 |
| Majority | | 1,625 | 27.29 | |
| Turnout | | 5,979 | 66.39 | |
| Democratic hold | | Swing | | |

Yuen Long District Council Election, 2015: Nam Ping
| Party | Candidate | Votes | % | ±% |
|---|---|---|---|---|
| Democratic | Zachary Wong Wai-yin | 2,598 | 63.5 | –10.0 |
| DAB | Cheung Fan-lan | 1,249 | 30.5 | +4.0 |
| Independent | Chan Wai-yi | 246 | 6.0 | |
| Majority | | 1,776 | 33.0 | –14.0 |
| Turnout | | 4,128 | 40.7 | |
| Democratic hold | | Swing | –7.0 | |

Yuen Long District Council Election, 2011: Nam Ping
| Party | Candidate | Votes | % | ±% |
|---|---|---|---|---|
| Democratic | Zachary Wong Wai-yin | 2,780 | 73.5 | +1.8 |
| DAB | Yau Ka-keung | 1,004 | 26.5 | –1.8 |
| Majority | | 1,776 | 47.0 | +3.6 |
| Democratic hold | | Swing | +1.8 | |

=== 2000s ===
Yuen Long District Council Election, 2007: Nam Ping
| Party | Candidate | Votes | % | ±% |
|---|---|---|---|---|
| Democratic | Zachary Wong Wai-yin | 2,298 | 71.7 | –9.3 |
| DAB | Yau Ka-keung | 909 | 28.3 | |
| Majority | | 1,389 | 43.4 | –18.6 |
| Democratic hold | | Swing | | |

Yuen Long District Council Election, 2003: Nam Ping
| Party | Candidate | Votes | % | ±% |
|---|---|---|---|---|
| Democratic | Zachary Wong Wai-yin | 2,085 | 81.0 | +9.3 |
| Independent | Raymond Ng Wai-tak | 489 | 19.0 | –9.5 |
| Majority | | 1,596 | 62.0 | +18.4 |
| Democratic hold | | Swing | | |

=== 1990s ===
Yuen Long District Council Election, 1999: Nam Ping
| Party | Candidate | Votes | % | ±% |
|---|---|---|---|---|
| Democratic | Zachary Wong Wai-yin | 2,129 | 71.1 | +6.1 |
| DAB | Raymond Ng Wai-tak | 853 | 28.5 | –6.0 |
| Majority | | 1,276 | 43.6 | +13.1 |
| Democratic hold | | Swing | +6.1 | |

Yuen Long District Board Election, 1994: Nam Ping
| Party | Candidate | Votes | % | ±% |
|---|---|---|---|---|
| Democratic | Zachary Wong Wai-yin | 1,748 | 65.0 | |
| DAB | Chan Siu-ching | 928 | 34.5 | |
| Majority | | 820 | 30.5 | |
| Democratic win (new seat) | | | | |
