= Ping Shek (constituency) =

Hong Kong constituency

- Elected constituency for the Kwun Tong District Council
- Boundary of Ping Shek in Kwun Tong District
- District: Kwun Tong
- Legislative Council constituency: Kowloon East
- Population: 16,446 (2019)
- Electorate: 8,280 (2019)

Current constituency
- Created: 1994
- Number of members: One
- Member: Lai Po-kwai (Democratic)

Ping Shek is one of the 37 constituencies of the Kwun Tong District Council. The seat elects one member of the council every four years. It was first created in Hong Kong district board elections, 1994 derived from Ping Shek & Kai Yip. The constituency boundary is loosely based on the Ping Shek Estate with estimated population of 16,446.

== Councillors represented ==
Election	Member	Party
1994	Lam Sum-shing	Democratic
1999	Chan Kam-lam	DAB
2007	Bernard Chan Pak-li	DAB
2013 by-election	Chan Chun-kit	DAB
2019	Kira Lai Po-kwai	Democratic

== Election results ==
=== 2010s ===
Kwun Tong District Council Election, 2019: Ping Shek
Party	Candidate	Votes	%	±%
Democratic	Kira Lai Po-kwai	2,982	51.14	
DAB	Chan Chun-kit	2,849	48.86	
Majority		133	2.28	
Turnout		5,859	70.82	
Democratic gain from DAB		Swing		

Kwun Tong District Council Election, 2015: Ping Shek
Party	Candidate	Votes	%	±%
DAB	Chan Chun-kit	Uncontested		
DAB hold		Swing		

Ping Shek by-election 2013
Party	Candidate	Votes	%	±%
DAB	Chan Chun-kit	2,258	65.3	−11.9
LSD	Leung Kwok-hung	1,198	34.7	+11.9
Majority		1,060	30.6	
Turnout		3,483	44.8	
DAB hold		Swing	-11.9	

Kwun Tong District Council Election, 2011: Ping Shek
Party	Candidate	Votes	%	±%
DAB	Bernard Chan Pak-li	2,759	77.2	+15.7
LSD	Lam Sum-shing	817	22.8	
DAB hold		Swing		

=== 2000s ===
Kwun Tong District Council Election, 2007: Ping Shek
Party	Candidate	Votes	%	±%
DAB	Bernard Chan Pak-li	2,647	62.9	+12.6
Civic	Yu Kwun-wai	1,386	32.9	
Independent	Lau Wing-tat	114	2.7	
Independent	Cheung Wai-hung	60	1.4	
DAB hold		Swing		

Kwun Tong District Council Election, 2003: Ping Shek
Party	Candidate	Votes	%	±%
DAB	Chan Kam-lam	2,284	50.3	−0.1
Frontier	Lam Sum-shing	2,259	49.7	+0.4
DAB hold		Swing	-0.3	

=== 1990s ===
Kwun Tong District Council Election, 1999: Ping Shek
Party	Candidate	Votes	%	±%
DAB	Chan Kam-lam	2,128	50.4	
Democratic	Lam Sum-shing	2,028	49.3	−3.1
DAB gain from Democratic		Swing		

Kuwn Tong District Board Election, 1994: Ping Shek
Party	Candidate	Votes	%	±%
Democratic	Lam Sum-shing	2,028	54.4	
KTMCFPA	Wong Wai-man	1,680	45.1	
Democratic win (new seat)				
