= Wah Fu North (constituency) =

Constituency in Southern District, Hong Kong

- Elected constituency for the Southern District Council
- Boundary of Wah Fu North in Southern District
- District: Southern
- Legislative Council constituency: Hong Kong Island West
- Population: 14,074 (2019)
- Electorate: 9,142 (2019)

Current constituency
- Created: 1994
- Number of members: One
- Member: Vacant

Wah Fu North, formerly called Wah Fu II is one of the 17 constituencies in the Southern District, Hong Kong.

The constituency returns one district councillor to the Southern District Council, with an election every four years. The seat was last held by Yim Chun-ho of the Democratic Party.

The Wah Fu North constituency is loosely based on northeastern part of the Wah Fu Estate in Pokfulam with estimated population of 14,386.

== Councillors represented ==
| Election | Member | Party |
|---|---|---|
| 1994 | Huang Chen-ya | Democratic |
| 2003 | Henry Chai Man-hon | Democratic |
| 2019 | Philip Yim Chun-ho→Vacant (Note: Resigned on 9 July 2021.) | Democratic |

== Election results ==
=== 2010s ===
Southern District Council Election, 2019: Wah Fu North
| Party | Candidate | Votes | % | ±% |
|---|---|---|---|---|
| Democratic | Philip Yim Chun-ho | 3,751 | 61.32 | +8.32 |
| DAB | Cheung Wai-nam | 2,366 | 38.68 | −7.22 |
| Majority | | 1,385 | 22.64 | |
| Turnout | | 6,133 | 67.13 | |
| Democratic hold | | Swing | | |

Southern District Council Election, 2015: Wah Fu North
| Party | Candidate | Votes | % | ±% |
|---|---|---|---|---|
| Democratic | Henry Chai Man-hon | 2,408 | 53.0 | –2.2 |
| DAB | Sunny Wong Choi-lap | 2,089 | 45.9 | +1.1 |
| Nonpartisan | Wun Kei-yan | 29 | 0.6 | |
| Independent | Law Yuet-wah | 21 | 0.5 | |
| Majority | | 319 | 10.4 | −29.8 |
| Turnout | | 4,569 | 53.1 | |
| Democratic hold | | Swing | –1.7 | |

Southern District Council Election, 2011: Wah Fu II
| Party | Candidate | Votes | % | ±% |
|---|---|---|---|---|
| Democratic | Henry Chai Man-hon | 2,234 | 55.2 | −14.9 |
| DAB | Sunny Wong Choi-lap | 1,811 | 44.8 | N/A |
| Majority | | 423 | 10.4 | −29.8 |
| Democratic hold | | Swing | | |

=== 2000s ===
Southern District Council Election, 2007: Wah Fu II
| Party | Candidate | Votes | % | ±% |
|---|---|---|---|---|
| Democratic | Henry Chai Man-hon | 2,450 | 70.1 | +12.4 |
| Independent | Marina Tsang Tze-kwan | 1,046 | 29.9 | N/A |
| Majority | | 1,404 | 40.2 | +24.8 |
| Democratic hold | | Swing | | |

Southern District Council Election, 2003: Wah Fu II
| Party | Candidate | Votes | % | ±% |
|---|---|---|---|---|
| Democratic | Henry Chai Man-hon | 2,112 | 57.7 | −4.0 |
| DAB | Mak Chi-yan | 1,550 | 42.3 | +4.0 |
| Majority | | 562 | 15.4 | −8.0 |
| Democratic hold | | Swing | | |

=== 1990s ===
Southern District Council Election, 1999: Wah Fu II
| Party | Candidate | Votes | % | ±% |
|---|---|---|---|---|
| Democratic | Huang Chen-ya | 1,618 | 61.7 | +0.1 |
| DAB | Mak Chi-yan | 1,003 | 38.3 | +11.8 |
| Majority | | 615 | 23.4 | −11.7 |
| Democratic hold | | Swing | | |

Southern District Board Election, 1994: Wah Fu II
| Party | Candidate | Votes | % | ±% |
|---|---|---|---|---|
| Democratic | Huang Chen-ya | 1,915 | 61.6 | |
| DAB | Wu Shu-cherk | 824 | 26.5 | |
| Independent | Kwong Shek-keung | 371 | 11.9 | |
| Majority | | 1,091 | 35.1 | (new) |
| Democratic win (new seat) | | | | |
