= 1982 Hong Kong local elections =

4 March & 23 September 1982	1985 →

All Elected Constituencies 132 (of the 490) seats in all 18 District Boards
- Registered: 899,559
- Turnout: 342,764 (38.93%)
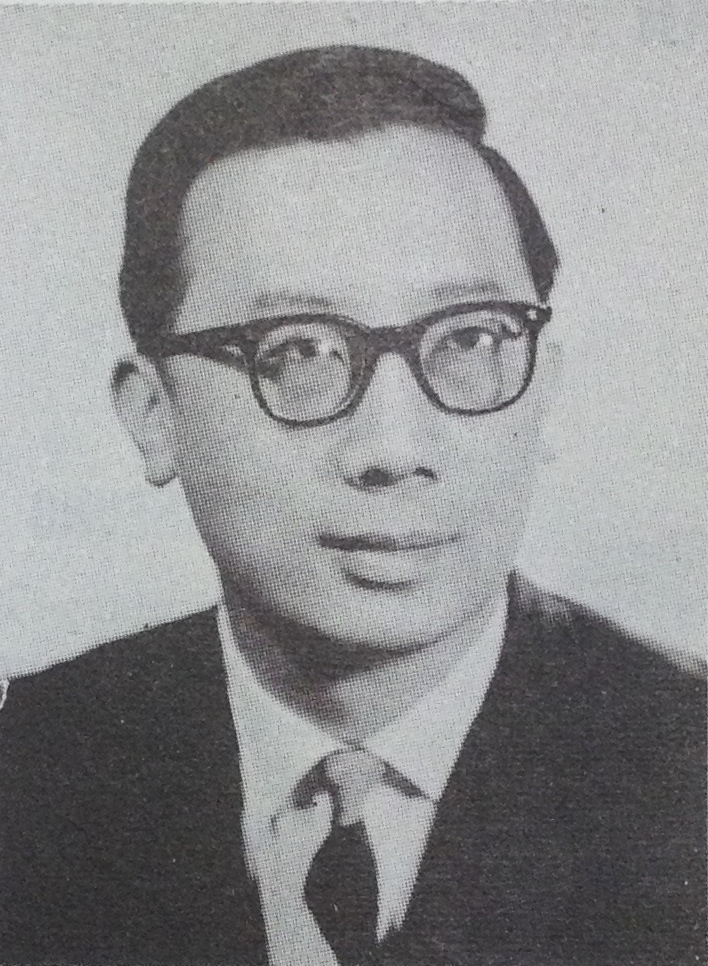
	First party	Second party
Leader	Hilton Cheong-Leen	Brook Bernacchi
Party	Civic	Reform
Seats won	6	4
Popular vote	26,601	16,479
Percentage	7.46%	4.62%

The 1982 Hong Kong local elections, commonly known as 1982 Hong Kong District Board elections, were the first ever local elections under the new creation of 18 district boards.

Under the governorship of Murray MacLehose, the Hong Kong Government published a Green Paper proposal entitled A Pattern of District Administration in Hong Kong in June 1980. It involved the setting up of 18 district boards to be partially directly elected on the universal franchise and partially appointed.

Among a total of 490 members in the 18 District Boards, 132 (around one-third) were directly elected by the general public. A further 134 members were appointed, and the rest were ex officio. The election for the district boards in New Territories was held on 4 March 1982 while the district boards in the urban areas was held on 23 September in the same year.

== List of District Boards ==
District Boards in Urban Area:

- Central and Western District Board
- Wan Chai District Board
- Eastern District Board
- Southern District Board
- Yau Ma Tei District Board
- Mong Kok District Board
- Sham Shui Po District Board
- Wong Tai Sin District Board
- Kwun Tong District Board

District Boards in Rural Area:

- Tsuen Wan District Board
- Tuen Mun District Board
- Yuen Long District Board
- North District Board
- Tai Po District Board
- Sai Kung District Board
- Sha Tin District Board
- Islands District Board

== General outcome ==
Political affiliation	Standing	Elected	Popular votes	%
Hong Kong Civic Association	24	6	26,601	7.46
Reform Club of Hong Kong	17	4	16,479	4.62
Individuals and others	362	122	313,318	87.91
Total (turnout: 38.9%)	403	132	356,398	100.00
