= Results breakdown of the 2015 Hong Kong local elections =

2015 Hong Kong local elections
- 22 November 2015
- Turnout: 47.01% ▲
Party	Leader	Vote %	Seats	+/–
DAB	Starry Lee	21.39%	119	0
Democratic	Emily Lau	13.56%	43	+1
FTU	Lam Shuk-yee	6.11%	27	−2
NPP	Regina Ip	5.24%	26	−1
ADPL	Bruce Liu	3.82%	18	+2
Neo Democrats	Chan King-ming & others	2.92%	15	+8
Civic	Alan Leong	3.62%	10	+3
BPA	Andrew Leung	1.90%	10	−4
Liberal	Vincent Fang	1.74%	9	−1
NWSC	Leung Yiu-chung	1.11%	5	0
Labour	Lee Cheuk-yan	1.59%	3	+2
This lists parties that won seats. See the complete results below.

This is the results breakdown of the 2015 District Council elections in Hong Kong. The results are generated from the Hong Kong Registration and Electoral Office website.

== Result overview ==
=== Central and Western ===
Code	Constituency	Incumbent	Pro-democracy Candidate(s)	Pro-Beijing Candidate(s)	Other Candidate(s)	Results
A01	Chung Wan	Hui Chi-fung (DP)	Hui Chi-fung (DP)	Vienna Lau Wai-yan (Ind)		Democratic hold
A02	Mid Levels East	Jackie Cheung Yick-hung (Ind)	Ng Siu-hong (DP)	Jackie Cheung Yick-hung (Ind)		Democratic gain from Independent
A03	Castle Road	Cheng Lai-king (DP)	Cheng Lai-king (DP)	Ng Lung-fei (LP)		Democratic hold
A04	Peak	Joseph Chan Ho-lim (LP)	Chan Shu-moon (Ind)	Joseph Chan Ho-lim (LP)		Liberal hold
A05	University	Stephen Chan Chit-kwai (Ind)	Edward Lau Wai-tak (Ind)	Stephen Chan Chit-kwai (Ind)		Independent hold
A06	Kennedy Town & Mount Davis	Chan Hok-fung (DAB)	Sin Cheuk-nam (DP); Chow Sai-kit (Youngspiration)	Chan Hok-fung (DAB)		DAB hold
A07	Kwun Lung	Ip Kwok-him (DAB)	Sixtus Leung Chung-hang (Youngspiration)	Yeung Hoi-wing (DAB)		DAB hold
A08	Sai Wan	Cheung Kwok-kwan (DAB)	Winfield Chong Wing-fai (DP)	Cheung Kwok-kwan (DAB)		DAB hold
A09	Belcher	Malcolm Lam Wai-wing (Ind)	Yeung Sui-yin (DP)	Yip Wing-shing (Ind)		Independent gain from Independent
A10	Shek Tong Tsui	Chan Choi-hi (Ind)	Sam Yip Kam-lung (Ind)	Chan Choi-hi (Ind)		Independent hold
A11	Sai Ying Pun	Lo Yee-hang (DAB)	Ng Wing-tak (Ind)	Lo Yee-hang (DAB)		DAB hold
A12	Sheung Wan	Kam Nai-wai (DP)	Kam Nai-wai (DP)	Lui Hung-pan (Ind)		Democratic hold
A13	Tung Wah	Siu Ka-yi (DAB)	Frederick Ho Chun-ki (DP)	Siu Ka-yi (DAB)		DAB hold
A14	Centre Street	Sidney Lee Chi-hang (Ind)	Cheung Kai-yan (DP)	Sidney Lee Chi-hang (Ind)		Independent hold
A15	Water Street	Wong Kin-shing (DP)	Bonnie Ng Hoi-yan (DP)	Yeung Hok-ming (DAB)		DAB gain from Democratic

=== Wan Chai ===
Code	Constituency	Incumbent	Pro-democracy Candidate(s)	Pro-Beijing Candidate(s)	Other Candidate(s)	Results
B01	Hennessy	Cheng Ki-kin (Ind)	Cheng Ki-kin (Ind)	Cheong Man-lei (Ind)		Independent hold
B02	Oi Kwan	Anna Tang King-yung (DAB)	Wong Sui-lung (Ind)	Anna Tang King-yung (DAB)		DAB hold
B03	Canal Road	Jacqueline Chung Ka-man (DAB)	Gloria Ho Wing-ka (Ind)	Jacqueline Chung Ka-man (DAB)		DAB hold
B04	Victoria Park	Jennifer Chow Kit-bing (DAB)		Jennifer Chow Kit-bing (DAB)		DAB uncontested
B05	Tin Hau	Joey Lee Man-lung (NPP)	Chan Kin-kwok (DP)	Joey Lee Man-lung (NPP)		NPP hold
B06	Causeway Bay	Yolanda Ng Yuen-ting (Ind)		Yolanda Ng Yuen-ting (Ind)		Independent uncontested
B07	Tai Hang	Wong Chor-fung (NPP)	Claris Yeung Suet-ying (Ind)	Gigi Wong Ching-chi (NPP)		Independent gain from NPP
B08	Jardine's Lookout	David Lai (Ind)	David Lai (Ind)	Wind Lam Wai-man (LP)		Liberal gain from Independent
B09	Broadwood	Pamela Peck Wan-kam (Ind)	Michael Mak Kwok-fung (LSD)	Paul Tse Wai-chun (Ind); Siu See-kong (Ind)		Independent gain from Independent
B10	Happy Valley	Stephen Ng Kam-chun (Ind)	Kelvin Chien Ka-wo (Ind)	Stephen Ng Kam-chun (Ind)		Independent hold
B11	Stubbs Road	Wong Wang-tai (Ind)	Au Lai-chong (Ind)	Wong Wang-tai (Ind)		Independent hold
B12	Southorn	Lee Pik-yee (Ind)	Yeung Yau-fung (Ind)	Lee Pik-yee (Ind)		Independent hold
B13	Tai Fat Hau	Kenny Lee Kwun-yee (DAB)	Leung Pak-kin (Ind)	Kenny Lee Kwun-yee (DAB)		DAB hold

=== Eastern ===
Code	Constituency	Incumbent	Pro-democracy Candidate(s)	Pro-Beijing Candidate(s)	Other Candidate(s)	Results
C01	Tai Koo Shing West	Andrew Chiu Ka-yin (DP)	Andrew Chiu Ka-yin (DP)	Tony Ng Chi-lung (Ind)		Democratic hold
C02	Tai Koo Shing East	Marcus Tse Tsz-kei (NPP)	Patrick Wong Chun-sing (Ind)	Marcus Tse Tsz-kei (NPP)		Independent gain from NPP
C03	Lei King Wan	Alexander Fu Yuen-cheung (Ind)	Wong Huk-kam (Lab)	Yeung Sze-chun (Ind); Alexander Fu Yuen-cheung (Ind)	Paul Ho Chiu-kwong (Ind)	Independent gain from Independent
C04	Aldrich Bay	Ngan Chun-lim (DAB)	Chan Ka-pak (DP)	Ngan Chun-lim (DAB)		DAB hold
C05	Shaukeiwan	Lo Tip-chun (DAB)	Leung Wing-sze (Ind)	Lam Sum-lim (DAB)	Poon Wing-yin (Ind)	DAB hold
C06	A Kung Ngam	Daniel To Boon-man (Ind)		George Lam Kei-tung (Ind); Hung Chi-kit (DAB)	Daniel To Boon-man (Ind)	Independent gain from Independent
C07	Heng Fa Chuen	Stanley Ho Ngai-kam (FTU)	Chow Wing-yee (Ind)	Stanley Ho Ngai-kam (FTU)	Martin Yeung Wai-hong (Ind)	FTU hold
C08	Tsui Wan	Kwan Shui-lung (DAB)	Ku Kwai-yiu (Ind)	Kwan Shui-lung (DAB); Lai Leung Siu-kwan (Ind)	Jeff Wan Tsz-fung (Ind)	Independent gain from DAB
C09	Yan Lam	Wong Kin-hing (Ind)		Wong Kin-hing (Ind)		Independent uncontested
C10	Siu Sai Wan	Chan Oi-kwan (FTU)	Tam Tak-chi (PP)	Wong Kwok-hing (FTU); Chu Yat-on (Ind)		FTU hold
C11	King Yee	David Leung Kwok-hung (FTU)	Chan Yiu-tak (Ind)	David Leung Kwok-hung (FTU); Yeung Hon-sing (Ind)	Wong Kwan-fung (Ind)	FTU hold
C12	Wan Tsui	Kung Pak-cheung (DAB)	Ng Yin-keung (Civ)	Kung Pak-cheung (DAB)		DAB hold
C13	Fei Tsui	Joseph Lai Chi-keong (Civ)	Joseph Lai Chi-keong (Civ); Lui Chi-man (Ind Dem)	Lily Li Lee (Ind)		Civic hold
C14	Mount Parker	Wong Kin-pan (DAB)		Wong Kin-pan (DAB)		DAB uncontested
C15	Braemar Hill	Shiu Ka-fai (LP)		Shiu Ka-fai (LP)		Liberal uncontested
C16	Fortress Hill	Frankie Lo Wing-kwan (Ind)		Frankie Lo Wing-kwan (Ind)		Independent uncontested
C17	City Garden	Hui Ching-on (Ind)		Hui Ching-on (Ind)		Independent uncontested
C18	Provident	Kwok Wai-keung (FTU)		Kwok Wai-keung (FTU)		FTU uncontested
C19	Fort Street	Hung Lin-cham (DAB)		Hung Lin-cham (DAB)		DAB uncontested
C20	Kam Ping	Choy So-yuk (DAB)		Choy So-yuk (DAB)		DAB uncontested
C21	Tanner	Desmond Lee Yu-tai (LP)	Cheng Tat-hung (Civ)	Tsang Chuek-yi (LP)		Civic gain from Liberal
C22	Healthy Village	Cheng Chi-sing (DAB)		Cheng Chi-sing (DAB)		DAB uncontested
C23	Quarry Bay	Eddie Ting Kong-ho (DAB)	Ip Chee-tak (Ind)	Eddie Ting Kong-ho (DAB)		DAB hold
C24	Nam Fung	Cheung Kwok-cheong (DP)	Cheung Kwok-cheong (DP)	Yang Mo (Ind)	Li Chak-sum (Ind)	Democratic hold
C25	Kornhill	Chan Kai-yuen (Civ)	Bonnie Leung Wing-man (Civ)	Hung Lung-chuen (NPP)	Wong Po-yi (Ind)	Civic hold
C26	Kornhill Garden	Leung Siu-sun (Civ)	Leung Siu-sun (Civ)	Doreen Kong Yuk-foon (NPP)		Civic hold
C27	Hing Tung	Hui Lam-hing (FTU)	Tsang Kwok-fai (Lab)	Hui Lam-hing (FTU)		FTU hold
C28	Sai Wan Ho	Kong Chack-ho (Ind)	Mak Tak-ching (Lab)	Kong Chack-ho (Ind)		Labour gain from Independent
C29	Lower Yiu Tung	Hui Ka-hoo (DAB)	Ng Kam-wai (Ind)	Dominic Wong Chi-chung (DAB); Ricky Wong Sze-chin (Ind)		DAB hold
C30	Upper Yiu Tung	Chiu Chi-keong (FTU)		Chiu Chi-keong (FTU)		FTU uncontested
C31	Hing Man	Chao Shing-kie (DAB)	Cheung Chun-poing (Ind)	Lau Hing-yeung (DAB)		DAB hold
C32	Lok Hong	Li Chun-chau (Ind)	Tsang Kin-shing (LSD)	Li Chun-chau (Ind)	Lun Man-kit (Ind)	Independent hold
C33	Tsui Tak	Lee Chun-keung (LP)	Li Kin-hang (Ind)	Lee Chun-keung (LP)		Liberal hold
C34	Yue Wan	Christopher Chung Shu-kun (DAB)	Chui Chi-kin (Ind)	Christopher Chung Shu-kun (DAB)		Independent gain from DAB
C35	Kai Hiu	Lam Chui-lin (Ind)		Lam Chui-lin (Ind); Elaine Chik Kit-ling (Ind)		Independent hold

=== Southern ===
Code	Constituency	Incumbent	Pro-democracy Candidate(s)	Pro-Beijing Candidate(s)	Other Candidate(s)	Results
D01	Aberdeen	Vincent Wong Lin-sun (Ind)	Zico Man Ho-keung (Civ)	Pauline Yam (Ind)	Ho Wai-chun (Ind); Lee Kit-hing (Ind)	Independent gain from Independent
D02	Ap Lei Chau Estate	Lam Yuk-chun (Ind)		Lam Yuk-chun (Ind)		Independent uncontested
D03	Ap Lei Chau North	Cheung Sik-yung (Ind)		Cheung Sik-yung (Ind)	Leung Kwok-keung (Ind)	Independent hold
D04	Lei Tung I	Au Nok-hin (DP)	Au Nok-hin (DP/APCCTU); Wong Yun-kei (Civ Passion)	Li Ka-ying (DAB)		Democratic/APCCTU hold
D05	Lei Tung II	Lo Kin-hei (DP)	Lo Kin-hei (DP); Timothy Tsoi Man-lung (Civ Passion)	Pang Siu-kei (DAB)	Tang Ka-lok (Ind)	Democratic hold
D06	South Horizons East	Lam Kai-fai (Ind)	Kenneth Chan Ka-lok (Civ); Joseph Au Yuen-fat (Ind)	Lam Kai-fai (Ind)		Independent hold
D07	South Horizons West	Judy Kapui Chan (NPP)	Erica Yuen Mi-ming (PP)	Judy Kapui Chan (NPP)		NPP hold
D08	Wah Kwai	Ada Mak Tse How-ling (DAB)	Yeung Siu-pik (DP)	Ada Mak Tse How-ling (DAB)	Daniel Lau Pak-tung (Ind)	DAB hold
D09	Wah Fu South	Au Lap-sing (Ind)	Li Shee-lin (DP)	Au Lap-sing (Ind)		Independent hold
D10	Wah Fu North	Chai Man-hon (DP)	Chai Man-hon (DP)	Wong Choi-lap (DAB)	Law Yuet-wah (Ind); Wun Kei-yan (Ind)	Democratic hold
D11	Pokfulam	Paulus Johannes Zimmerman (Ind)	Paulus Johannes Zimmerman (Ind Dem)	Jeremy Young Chit-on (LP)		Independent hold
D12	Chi Fu	Chu Ching-hong (Ind)	Yiu Chung-yim (Ind)	Chu Ching-hong (Ind)		Independent hold
D13	Tin Wan	Chan Fu-ming (Ind)		Chan Fu-ming (Ind)		Independent uncontested
D14	Shek Yue	Chu Lap-wai (DAB)		Chu Lap-wai (DAB)		DAB uncontested
D15	Wong Chuk Hang	Tsui Yuen-wa (DP)	Tsui Yuen-wa (DP)	Chan Wing-yan (FTU)		Democratic hold
D16	Bays Area	Fergus Fung Se-goun (LP)		Fergus Fung Se-goun (LP)	David John Schaus (Ind)	Liberal hold
D17	Stanley & Shek O	Lee Pui-ying (Ind)		Lee Pui-ying (Ind); Tsang Tsz-ho (LP); Maxine Yao Jie-ning (Ind)		Independent hold

=== Yau Tsim Mong ===
Code	Constituency	Incumbent	Pro-democracy Candidate(s)	Pro-Beijing Candidate(s)	Other Candidate(s)	Results
E01	Tsim Sha Tsui West	Hung Chiu-wah (DAB)	Lau Chi-hung (Ind)	Hung Chiu-wah (DAB)		DAB hold
E02	Jordan South	Chris Ip Ngo-tung (DAB)	Joey Lui Ngar-yee (HKAA)	Chris Ip Ngo-tung (DAB)		DAB hold
E03	Jordan West	Chan Siu-tong (DAB)		Chan Siu-tong (DAB)		DAB uncontested
E04	Yau Ma Tei South	Yeung Tsz-hei (DAB)	Au Yeung Tung (ADPL)	Yeung Tsz-hei (DAB)		DAB hold
E05	Charming	Chung Kong-mo (DAB)	Lee Wai-fung (DP)	Chung Kong-mo (DAB)		DAB hold
E06	Mong Kok West	Hui Tak-leung (Ind)		Hui Tak-leung (Ind)		Independent uncontested
E07	Fu Pak	Chan Wai-keung (Ind)	Yu Tak-po (Civ)	Paul Law Siu-hung (Ind)		Civic gain from Independent
E08	Olympic	James To Kun-sun (DP)	James To Kun-sun (DP)	Patrick Ko Hiu-wing (Ind)		Democratic hold
E09	Cherry	John Wong-chung (Ind)	Lam Ho-yeung (DP); Nakade Hitsujiko	Chung Chak-fai (Ind)		Independent gain from Independent
E10	Tai Kok Tsui South	Benjamin Choi Siu-fung (DAB)	Lai Yiu-chun (Youngspiration)	Benjamin Choi Siu-fung (DAB)		DAB hold
E11	Tai Kok Tsui North	Lau Pak-kei (DAB)	Wong Ka-ying (Civ)	Lau Pak-kei (DAB)		DAB hold
E12	Tai Nan	Francis Chong Wing-charn (KWND/BPA)	Joshua Fung Man-tao (DP); Chiu Yuk-kwong (Youngspiration)	Francis Chong Wing-charn (KWND/BPA)		KWND/BPA hold
E13	Mong Kok North	Wong Shu-ming (KWND)	Wong Ka-chun (Youngspiration)	Wong Shu-ming (KWND)		KWND hold
E14	Mong Kok East	Wong Kin-san (Ind)	Lau Chun-yip (DP)	Wong Kin-san (Ind)	Jefferson Keller Tse (Ind)	Independent hold
E15	Mong Kok South	Chow Chun-fai (Ind)		Chow Chun-fai (Ind)		Independent uncontested
E16	Yau Ma Tei North	New Seat	Lam Kin-man (ADPL)	Man Yun-wa (FTU)		ADPL gain new seat
E17	East Tsim Sha Tsui & King's Park	New Seat	Henry Chan Man-yu (Prof Commons)	Michelle Tang Ming-sum (Ind)		Independent gain new seat
E18	Tsim Sha Tsui Central	New Seat		Kwan Sau-ling (DAB); Liu Siu-fai (Ind)		DAB hold
E19	Jordan North	New Seat	Chick Chi-leung (Ind)	Craig Jo Chun-wah (DAB)		DAB gain new seat

=== Sham Shui Po ===
Code	Constituency	Incumbent	Pro-democracy Candidate(s)	Pro-Beijing Candidate(s)	Other Candidate(s)	Results
F01	Po Lai	Leung Yau-fong (ADPL)	Leung Yau-fong (ADPL)	Tse Hiu-hung		ADPL hold
F02	Cheung Sha Wan	Aaron Lam Ka-fai (BPA/KWND)	Leos Lee Man-ho (CSWP); Lam Shui-hum (Ind)	Aaron Lam Ka-fai (BPA/KWND)		BPA/KWND hold
F03	Nam Cheong North	Vincent Cheng Wing-shun (DAB)	Jordan Chan WIng-fai (PP)	Vincent Cheng Wing-shun (DAB)		DAB hold
F04	Shek Kip Mei	New Seat	Tsung Po-shan (ADPL)	Chan Kwok-wai (SKMERSC/KWND)		KWND gain new seat
F05	Nam Cheong East	New Seat	Kalvin Ho Kai-ming (ADPL)	Miu Hoi-ming (Ind)		ADPL gain new seat
F06	Nam Cheong South	Wong Kam-kuen (FLU)	Lam Wai-tong (CYRSC/DA)	Lee Wing-man (FLU)		FLU hold
F07	Nam Cheong Central	Lau Puk-yuk (DAB)	Mak Wai-ming (Ind)	Lau Puk-yuk (DAB)		DAB hold
F08	Nam Cheong West	Wai Woon-nam (ADPL)	Wai Woon-nam (ADPL)	Heung Ming-hau (Ind)		ADPL hold
F09	Fu Cheong	Leung Man-kwong (KWND)	Li Kwing (ADPL)	Leung Man-kwong (KWND/FCERA/WCERSA)		KWND hold
F10	Lai Kok	Frederick Fung Kin-kee (ADPL)	Frederick Fung Kin-kee (ADPL)	Chan Wing-yan (DAB/FTU)	Eric Wong Chung-ki (Ind)	DAB/FTU gain from ADPL
F11	Fortune	Chum Tak-shing (ADPL)	Zoe Chow Wing-heng (ADPL)	Cheung Tak-wai (DAB)		ADPL hold
F12	Lai Chi Kok South	Wong Chi-yung (ADPL)	Yeung Yuk (ADPL)	Derrick Tan Wie-hon (DAB); Mui Yu (Ind)		ADPL hold
F13	Mei Foo South	Wong Tat-tung (DAB)	Joe Wong Tak-chuen (Civ); Judy Tzeng Li-wen (Ind)	Wong Tat-tung (DAB)		DAB hold
F14	Mei Foo Central	Shum Siu-hung (BPA/KWND)	Ng Yuet-lan (Civ)	Shum Siu-hung (BPA/KWND)	Stephen Chan Chung-kong (Ind)	Civic gain from BPA/KWND
F15	Mei Foo North	Ambrose Cheung Wing-sum (Ind)	Joshua Li Chun-hei (Civ)	Ambrose Cheung Wing-sum (Ind)		Independent hold
F16	Lai Chi Kok Central	New Seat	Ramon Yuen Hoi-man (DP)	Bruce Li Ki-fung (BPA)		Democratic gain new seat
F17	Lai Chi Kok North	Bruce Li Ki-fung (BPA)	Chum Tak-shing (ADPL)	Wong King (Ind); Wu Sai-chuen (Ind)		ADPL gain from BPA
F18	Un Chau & So Uk	Chan Wai-ming (DAB)	Fong Chi-lung (Civ Passion)	Chan Wai-ming (DAB)		DAB hold
F19	Lei Cheng Uk	Chan Keng-chau (KWND)	Kong Kwai-sang (ADPL)	Chan Keng-chau (KWND)		ADPL gain from KWND
F20	Ha Pak Tin	Yan Kai-wing (BPA/KWND)	Sally Tang Mei-ching (Socialist Action)	Yan Kai-wing (BPA/KWND)		BPA/KWND hold
F21	Yau Yat Tsuen	Kwok Chun-wah (BPA)	Dickson Chau Ka-faat (LSD)	Dominic Lee Tsz-king (LP)		Liberal gain from BPA
F22	Nam Shan, Tai Hang Tung & Tai Hang Sai	Wai Hoi-ying (KWND)	Tam Kwok-kiu (ADPL)	Wai Hoi-ying (KWND)	Foo Wai-lok (Ind)	ADPL gain from KWND
F23	Lung Ping & Sheung Pak Tin	Carman Ng Mei (ADPL)	Carman Ng Mei (ADPL)	Raymond Lam Wai-man (FTU)	Cheng Chi-hong (Ind)	ADPL hold

=== Kowloon City ===
Code	Constituency	Incumbent	Pro-democracy Candidate(s)	Pro-Beijing Candidate(s)	Other Candidate(s)	Results
G01	Ma Tau Wai	Rosanda Mok Ka-han (ADPL)	Rosanda Mok Ka-han (ADPL)	Terence Siu Tin-hung (DAB)		DAB gain from ADPL
G02	Ma Hang Chung	Wong Yun-cheong (FTU)	Lai Kwong-wai (ADPL); Lau Shu-yin	Wong Yun-cheong (FTU)		ADPL gain from FTU
G03	Ma Tau Kok	Li Lin (Ind)	Au Wing-ho (HKAA)	Kwan Ho-yeung (DAB)		DAB gain from Independent
G04	Lok Man	Yang Wing-kit (Ind)	Pong Yat-ming (Ind)	Yang Wing-kit (Ind)		Independent hold
G05	Sheung Lok	Luk King-kwong (DAB)	Wong Wing-kit (ADPL)	Luk King-kwong (DAB)	Judy Chan Ka-ling (Ind)	DAB hold
G06	Ho Man Tin	Cheng Lee-ming (Ind)	Chan Lai-kwan (DP)	Cheng Lee-ming (Ind)		Independent hold
G07	Kadoorie	Siu Leong-sing (ADPL)	Siu Leong-sing (ADPL)	Wong Chi (Ind)	Lau Hok-wai (Ind)	ADPL hold
G08	Prince	Wong Yee-him (DAB)		Ting Kin-wa (Ind)		Independent gain from DAB
G09	Kowloon Tong	Ho Hin-ming (LP)		Ho Hin-ming (LP)		Liberal uncontested
G10	Lung Shing	Ng Po-keung (DAB)		Ng Po-keung (DAB)	Wong Man-sing (Ind)	DAB hold
G11	Sung Wong Toi	New Seat	Yeung Chun-yu (ADPL)	Gary Cheng Chun-wah (FTU); Alexander Ip Chi-wai (Ind)		ADPL gain new seat
G12	Kai Tak North	New Seat	Li TIng-fung (ADPL)	Leung Yuen-ting (Ind)	Miranda Lam Hei-ting (Ind); Chan Po-yuk (Ind)	Independent gain new seat
G13	Kai Tak South	New Seat	So Yee-man (DP)	He Huahan (Ind)		Independent gain new seat
G14	Hoi Sham	Pun Kwok-wah (DAB)	Lee Ka-wai (HKAA)	Pun Kwok-wah (DAB)		DAB hold
G15	To Kwa Wan North	Starry Lee Wai-king (DAB)	Lam Yi-lai (HKAA); Shum Tai-fung (Ind)	Starry Lee Wai-king (DAB)		DAB hold
G16	To Kwa Wan South	Pun Chi-man (Ind)	Chong Lai-ling (DP)	Lam Pok (Ind)		Independent gain from Independent
G17	Hok Yuen Laguna Verde	Siu Yuen-sheung (DAB)	Yeung Ke-cheong	Admond Yue Chee-wing (Ind); Siu Yuen-sheung (DAB)		Independent gain from DAB
G18	Whampoa East	Leung Mei-fun (KWND/BPA)	Yau Wai-ching (Youngspiration)	Leung Mei-fun (KWND/BPA)	Law Shek-ming (Ind)	KWND/BPA hold
G19	Whampoa West	Lau Wai-wing (Ind)	Kwong Po-yin (Youngspiration)	Lau Wai-wing (Ind)		Youngspiration gain from Independent
G20	Hung Hom Bay	Cheung Yan-hong (Ind)	Chiu Shi-shun (Lab); Virginia Fung King-man (Ind)	Cheung Yan-hong (Ind)	Calvin Li Kam-cheong (Ind)	Independent hold
G21	Hung Hom	Pius Yum Kwok-tung (ADPL)	Pius Yum Kwok-tung (ADPL)	Lam Tak-shing (DAB)	Wong Chi-keung (Ind)	DAB gain from ADPL
G22	Ka Wai	Lo Chiu-kit (Ind)		Lo Chiu-kit (Ind)		Independent uncontested
G23	Oi Man	Ng Fan-kam (DAB)	Ma Hei-pang (DP)	Ng Fan-kam (DAB)		DAB hold
G24	Oi Chun	Cho Wui-hung (Ind)	Chan Yau-cheong (Civ)	Cho Wui-hung (Ind)		Independent hold

=== Wong Tai Sin ===
Code	Constituency	Incumbent	Pro-democracy Candidate(s)	Pro-Beijing Candidate(s)	Other Candidate(s)	Results
H01	Lung Tsui	Wong Kam-chi (Ind)	Jackal Tsang Cheuk-kuen (Ind)	Lee Tung-kong (Ind); Edmond Yeung Man-sek (Ind)		Independent gain from Independent
H02	Lung Ha	Kwok Sau-ying (Ind)	Kwok Sau-ying (Ind)	Lee Yim-hung (Ind)		Independent hold
H03	Lung Sheung	Chan Yuen-han (FTU)	Ricky Lam Wai-kei (DP)	Lam Man-fai (FTU); Chow Lai-cheong (Ind)		FTU hold
H04	Fung Wong	Joe Chan Yim-kwong (Ind)	Joe Chan Yim-kwong (Ind)	Wong Kam-chiu (Ind)		Independent hold
H05	Fung Tak	Kan Chi-ho (DAB)		Kan Chi-ho (DAB)	Wong Kwok-keung (Ind)	DAB hold
H06	Lung Sing	Tam Heung-man (TF)	Tam Heung-man (TF)	Ngok King-fun (Ind)	Ho Wai-kuen (Ind); Joseph Lam Chok (Ind)	Frontier hold
H07	San Po Kong	Lee Tat-yan (Ind)		Wendy Lui Kai-lin (Ind); Wat Ki-on (Ind)		Independent gain from Independent
H08	Tung Tau	Li Tak-hong (DAB)		Li Tak-hong (DAB)	Cheung Pak-hang (Ind)	DAB hold
H09	Tung Mei	Mok Ying-fan (ADPL)	Sze Tak-loy (ADPL)	Wong Kwok-yan (DAB)		ADPL hold
H10	Lok Fu	Andie Chan Wai-kwan (Ind)		Andie Chan Wai-kwan (Ind)	Yuen Yuet-hing (Ind)	Independent hold
H11	Wang Tau Hom	Joe Lai Wing-ho (DAB)		Joe Lai Wing-ho (DAB)		DAB uncontested
H12	Tin Keung	Chan On-tai (LP)	Raymond Lee Ho-yin (Civ)	Chan On-tai (LP)		Liberal hold
H13	Tsui Chuk & Pang Ching	So Sik-kin (Ind)		So Sik-kin (Ind)	Leonard Chan Ying (Ind); Lee Ka-hing (Ind)	Independent gain from Independent
H14	Chuk Yuen South	Hui Kam-shing (ADPL)	Hui Kam-shing (ADPL)	Chan Chak-sum (FTU)		ADPL hold
H15	Chuk Yuen North	Roy Ting Chi-wai (Ind)	Chan Kit-bing (PP)	Roy Ting Chi-wai (Ind)		Independent hold
H16	Tsz Wan West	Yuen Kwok-keung (DAB)	Yung Sing-kwong (DP); Leung Yau-king (Civ Passion)	Yuen Kwok-keung (DAB)		DAB hold
H17	Ching Oi	Maggie Chan Man-ki (DAB)	Mak Tsz-ho (TWSCP)	Maggie Chan Man-ki (DAB)		DAB hold
H18	Ching On	Wong Yat-yuk (Ind)	Wong Yat-yuk (Ind)			Independent uncontested
H19	Tsz Wan East	Ho Hon-man (DAB)	Tam Chun-man (TWSCP)	Ho Hon-man (DAB)		DAB hold
H20	King Fu	Wu Chi-wai (DP)	Wu Chi-wai (DP)	Wong Chun-kin (FTU)		Democratic hold
H21	Choi Wan East	Wong Kwok-tung (DP)	Wong Kwok-tung (DP)	Timothy Choy Tsz-kin (DAB)	Lok Wai-chuen (Ind)	DAB gain from Democratic
H22	Choi Wan South	Sum Wan-wah (DP)	Sum Wan-wa (DP)	Li Mei-lan (DAB)		Democratic hold
H23	Choi Wan West	Tam Mei-po (FTU/DAB)	Tse Chi-kit (DP)	Tam Mei-po (FTU/DAB)		FTU/DAB hold
H24	Chi Choi	Ho Yin-fai (FTU/DAB)	Wu Chi-kin (DP)	Ho Yin-fai (FTU/DAB)		Democratic gain from FTU/DAB
H25	Choi Hung	Mok Kin-wing (FTU)	Leung Tat-por (Ind)	Mok Kin-wing (FTU)		FTU hold

=== Kwun Tong ===
Code	Constituency	Incumbent	Pro-democracy Candidate(s)	Pro-Beijing Candidate(s)	Other Candidate(s)	Results
J01	Kwun Tong Central	Nelson Chan Wah-yu (Ind)		Nelson Chan Wah-yu (Ind)		Independent uncontested
J02	Kowloon Bay	Winnie Poon Yam Wai-chun (Ind)	Winnie Poon Yam Wai-chun (Ind)			Independent uncontested
J03	Kai Yip	Sze Lun-hung (DAB)	Lam Sing (DP)	Au Yeung Kwan-nok (DAB)		DAB hold
J04	Lai Ching	Poon Chun-yuen (DAB)	Sheik Anthony Bux (Civ)	Poon Chun-yuen (DAB)		Civic gain from DAB
J05	Ping Shek	Chan Chun-kit (DAB)		Chan Chun-kit (DAB)		DAB uncontested
J06	Sheung Choi	Tam Siu-cheuk (DAB)		Tam Siu-cheuk (DAB)		DAB uncontested
J07	Jordan Valley	Ngan Man-yu (DAB)	Wong Wai-tag (DP)	Ngan Man-yu (DAB)		DAB hold
J08	Shun Tin	Benjamin Kwok Bit-chun (DAB)	Mok Kin-shing (DP)	Benjamin Kwok Bit-chun (DAB)		Democratic gain from DAB
J09	Sheung Shun	Fu Pik-chun (Ind)		Fu Pik-chun (Ind)		Independent uncontested
J10	On Lee	Choy Chak-hung (Ind)	Choy Chak-hung (Ind)	Leung Tang-fung (DAB)	Cho Ka-fai (Ind)	Independent hold
J11	Po Tat	Hung Kam-in (DAB)		Hung Kam-in (DAB)	Tam Ho-lam (Ind)	DAB hold
J12	Sau Mau Ping North	Wong Chun-ping (Ind)		Wong Chun-ping (Ind)		Independent uncontested
J13	Hiu Lai	So Lai-chun (Ind)	Bonhoeffer Fung Kwok-keung (Ind)	So Lai-chun (Ind)		Independent hold
J14	Sau Mau Ping South	Mak Fu-ling (DAB)	Kai Ming-wah (DP); Cheng Kwok-chun (KEC)	Jimmy Chan Yiu-hung (Ind)		Independent gain from DAB
J15	Sau Mau Ping Central	New Seat		Cheung Pui-kong (DAB)		DAB gain new seat
J16	Hing Tin	Chan Man-kin (DP)	Chan Man-kin (DP)	Lo Chinig (FTU)		Democratic hold
J17	Lam Tin	Kan Ming-tung (FTU)	Yau Mei-po (Ind)	Kan Ming-tung (FTU)		FTU hold
J18	Kwong Tak	Wilson Or Chong-shing (DAB)		Wilson Or Chong-shing (DAB)		DAB uncontested
J19	Ping Tin	Yiu Pak-leung (Ind)	Ng Chi-fai (Ind)	Yiu Pak-leung (Ind)		Independent hold
J20	Pak Nga	Ho Kai-ming (FTU)	Chan Yu-ming (Civ)	Ho Kai-ming (FTU)	Yu Sui-sang (Ind)	FTU hold
J21	Yau Tong East	Cheung Ki-tang (DAB)		Cheung Ki-tang (DAB)		DAB uncontested
J22	Yau Lai	Patrick Lai Shu-ho (Ind)	Hon Ka-ming (DP)	Patrick Lai Shu-ho (Ind)	Francis Cheng Wah-tung (Ind)	Independent hold
J23	Chui Cheung	Tse Suk-chun (Ind)	Tse Suk-chun (Ind)	Wong Kai-san (FTU)		Independent hold
J24	Yau Tong West	Lui Tung-hai (Ind)		Lui Tung-hai (Ind)		Independent uncontested
J25	Laguna City	Tang Wing-chun (Ind)	Jeremy Jansen Tam Man-ho (Civ)	Tang Wing-chun (Ind)		Independent hold
J26	King Tin	Cheung Shun-wah (Ind)	Tong Dick-kan (Civ)	Cheung Shun-wah (Ind)		Independent hold
J27	Tsui Ping	Fung Mei-wan (Ind)	Carol Lam Ho-chun (PP/TF)	Cheng Keung-fung (FPHE)		FPHE gain from Independent
J28	Po Lok	Lau Ting-on (NCF)	Cheng Keng-ieong (DP)	Lau Ting-on (NCF)		Democratic gain from NCF
J29	Yuet Wah	Hsu Hoi-shan (Ind)	Chan Kam-wai (Ind)	Hsu Hoi-shan (Ind)		Independent hold
J30	Hip Hong	Bunny Chan Chung-bun (Ind)		Bunny Chan Chung-bun (Ind)	Chau Chung-ping (Ind); Edith Wong Yi-ting (Ind)	Independent hold
J31	Hong Lok	Ma Yat-chiu (Ind)	Chan Chak-to (KEC)	Ma Yat-chiu (Ind)		Independent hold
J32	Ting On	Wong Kai-ming (DP)	Wong Kai-ming (DP)	Kam Kin (Ind)		Independent gain from Democratic
J33	Upper Ngau Tau Kok Estate	New Seat	Hendrick Lui Chi-hang (Ind)	Ben Chan Kok-wah (DAB)		DAB gain new seat
J34	Lower Ngau Tau Kok Estate	New Seat	Wong Ching-fung (DP)	Cheugn Yiu-pan (DAB)		DAB gain new seat
J35	To Tai	Yip Hing-kwok (Ind)		Yip Hing-kwok (Ind)		Independent uncontested
J36	Lok Wah North	Fung Kam-yuen (Ind)	Wong Chi-ken (KEC)	Fung Kam-yuen (Ind)		KEC gain from Independent
J37	Lok Wah South	Kevin So Koon-chung (Ind)	Kevin So Koon-chung (Ind)	Lee Ka-hang (FTU)		Independent hold

=== Tsuen Wan ===
Code	Constituency	Incumbent	Pro-democracy Candidate(s)	Pro-Beijing Candidate(s)	Other Candidate(s)	Results
K01	Tak Wah	Lo Siu-kit (Ind)		Lo Siu-kit (Ind)		Independent uncontested
K02	Yeung Uk Road	Chan Han-pan (DAB)	Lam Sek-tim (TWCN)	Chan Han-pan (DAB)		DAB hold
K03	Hoi Bun	Chow Ping-tim (Ind)		Chow Ping-tim (Ind); Cheng Pak-keung (Ind)		Independent hold
K04	Clague Garden	Chan Kam-lam (DAB)	Tong Wing-chi (Ind)	Koo Yeung-pong (DAB)		DAB hold
K05	Fuk Loi	Kot Siu-yuen (FTU)		Kot Siu-yuen (FTU)		FTU uncontested
K06	Discovery Park	Michael Tien Puk-sun (NPP)	Chiu Yan-loy (Lab)	Michael Tien Puk-sun (NPP)		NPP hold
K07	Tsuen Wan Centre	Li Hung-por (DP)	Li Hung-por (DP)	Tsang Tai (DAB)		Democratic hold
K08	Allway	Lam Yuen-pun (Ind)	Louis Wong Yui-tak (DP)	Lam Yuen-pun (Ind)		Independent hold
K09	Lai To	Wong Wai-kit (Ind)	Vicky Chiu Pui-sze (Civ)	Wong Wai-kit (Ind)		Independent hold
K10	Ting Sham	New Seat	Ha Hei-lok (Lab)	Cheng Chit-pun (NPP); Edwin Cheng Shing-lung (Ind)		NPP gain new seat
K11	Tsuen Wan West	New Seat	Poon Chiu-lam (TWDFTP)	Nixie Lam Lam (DAB)	Chu Shun-ming (Ind)	DAB gain new seat
K12	Tsuen Wwan Rural	New Seat		Chan Wai-ming (Ind)	Ng Hin-lung (Ind)	Independent gain new seat
K13	Ma Wan	New Seat	Tam Hoi-pong (ND); Justin Tseng Wen-tien (Ind)	Kevin Wong Chiu-wah (NPP)	William Luk Wai-leung (TS)	Neo Democrats gain new seat
K14	Luk Yeung	Lam Faat-kang (Ind)	Wong Pui-chi (ND)	Lam Faat-kang (Ind)		Independent hold
K15	Lei Muk Shue East	Sumly Chan Yuen-sum (Civ)	Sumly Chan Yuen-sum (Civ)	Lui Dik-ming (DAB)		Civic hold
K16	Lei Muk Shue West	Wong Ka-wa (Civ)	Wong Ka-wa (Civ)	Tam Tsz-fei (FTU)		Civic hold
K17	Shek Wai Kok	Man Yu-ming (NTAS)	Lai Man-fai (Ind)	Man Yu-ming (NTAS/FPHE)		NTAS/FPHE hold
K18	Cheung Shek	Chan Chun-chung (DAB)	Chan Ka-wing (DP); Aden Wong Chi-shun (DA)	Chan Chun-chung (DAB)		DAB hold

=== Tuen Mun ===
Code	Constituency	Incumbent	Pro-democracy Candidate(s)	Pro-Beijing Candidate(s)	Other Candidate(s)	Results
L01	Tuen Mun Town Centre	Au Chi-yuen (Ind)		Au Chi-yuen (Ind)	Chiu Kam-moon (Ind)	Independent hold
L02	Siu Chi	Lam Chung-hoi (DP)	Lam Chung-hoi (DP)	Li Ching-yee (DAB)	Wong Ka-leung (Ind)	Democratic hold
L03	Siu Tsui	Lo Man-hon (DP)	Tang Chun-to (DP)	Yip Man-pan (DAB)	Ng Hon-ying (Ind)	DAB gain from Democratic
L04	On Ting	Kong Fung-yi (ADPL)	Kong Fung-yi (ADPL)	Fung Pui-yin (FTU)		ADPL hold
L05	Yau Oi South	Tsang Hin-hong (DAB)	Chin Po-fun (PP)	Tsang Hin-hong (DAB)		DAB hold
L06	Yau Oi North	Chan Wan-sang (DAB)	Tam Chun-yin (Lab); Lam Lap	Chan Wan-sang (DAB)		Labour gain from DAB
L07	Tsui Hing	Chu Yiu-wah (NPP)		Chu Yiu-wah (NPP)		NPP uncontested
L08	Shan King	Ng Koon-hung (Ind)	Hon Lai-yin (TMC)	Ng Koon-hung (Ind)		Independent hold
L09	King Hing	Chan Yau-hoi (FTU)		Chan Yau-hoi (FTU)		FTU uncontested
L10	Hing Tsak	Tsui Fan (FTU)	Chan Sze-nga (TMC)	Tsui Fan (FTU)		FTU hold
L11	San Hui	Kwu Hon-keung (Ind)	Ho Hau-chun (Ind)	Kwu Hon-keung (Ind); Hui Cheuk-ho (Ind)		Independent hold
L12	Sam Shing	So Shiu-shing (NPP)	Lee Kam-tim (Ind)	So Shiu-shing (NPP)		NPP hold
L13	Hanford	Beatrice Chu Shun-nga (DP)	Beatrice Chu Shun-nga (DP)	Ngai Ka-ho (Ind)	Li Kwai-fong (Ind); Wong Chak-wah (Ind)	Democratic hold
L14	Fu Sun	Lung Kang-san (Ind)	Cheung Wai-kau (Ind)	Kam Man-fung (NPP); Lung Kang-san (Ind)	Li Sai-keung (Ind); Thomas Tai Yin-chiu (Ind); Chris Ho Ying-sang (Ind)	NPP gain from Independent
L15	Yuet Wu	Cheung Hang-fai (DAB)	Natalie Yip Lai-mei (Ind)	Cheung Hang-fai (DAB)		DAB hold
L16	Siu Hei	Yim Ting-sang (ADPL)	Yan Siu-nam (ADPL)	Hau Kwok-tung (DAB)		ADPL hold
L17	Wu King	Leung Kin-man (DAB)	Chow Kai-lim (TMC)	Leung Kin-man (DAB)		DAB hold
L18	Butterfly	So Oi-kwan (DAB)	Yeung Chi-hang (ADPL)	So Oi-kwan (DAB)		ADPL gain from DAB
L19	Lok Tsui	Ho Chun-yan (DP)	Ho Chun-yan (DP); Cheng Chung-tai (Civ Passion)	Ho Kwan-yiu (Ind); Leo Shum Kam-tim (Ind)	Yuen Wai-chung (Message); Cheung Wing-wai (Ind)	Independent gain from Democratic
L20	Lung Mun	Lung Shui-hing (DAB)		Lung Shui-hing (DAB)		DAB uncontested
L21	San King	Catherine Wong Lai-sheung (DP)	Catherine Wong Lai-sheung (DP)	Lee Fung-sim (DAB)		Democratic hold
L22	Leung King	Ching Chi-hung (DAB)		Ching Chi-hung (DAB); Kwun Tung-wing (Ind)		DAB hold
L23	Tin King	Lothar Lee Hung-sham (FTU)	Chiu Kim-ling (Ind)	Lothar Lee Hung-sham (FTU)		FTU hold
L24	Po Tin	So Ka-man (NPP)	Chu Siu-hung (Ind)	So Ka-man (NPP)		NPP hold
L25	Kin Sang	Chan Man-wah (DAB)	Lam Tsz-ching (Ind)	Chan Man-wah (DAB)		DAB hold
L26	Siu Hong	Josephine Chan Shu-ying (DP)	Josephine Chan Shu-ying (DP)	Rex Mo Shing-fung (DAB)	Law Ho-yan (Ind)	DAB gain from Democratic
L27	Prime View	Ho Hang-mui (DP)	Ho Hang-mui (DP)	Kwong Man-tik (Ind)		Democratic hold
L28	Fu Tai	Manwell Chan (FTU)	Ho Wai-cheung (TMC)	Manwell Chan (FTU)		FTU hold
L29	Tuen Mun Rural	To Sheck-yuen (Ind)		To Sheck-yuen (Ind); Tang Tak-sum (Ind)		Independent hold

=== Yuen Long ===
Code	Constituency	Incumbent	Pro-democracy Candidate(s)	Pro-Beijing Candidate(s)	Other Candidate(s)	Results
M01	Fung Nin	Lui Kin (DAB)	Wong Kwok-hung (DA)	Lui Kin (DAB)		DAB hold
M02	Shui Pin	Yuen Man-yee (Ind)		Yuen Man-yee (Ind)		Independent uncontested
M03	Nam Ping	Zachary Wong Wai-yin (DP)	Zachary Wong Wai-yin (DP)	Cheung Fan-lan (DAB); Chan Wai-yi (Ind)		Democratic hold
M04	Pek Long	Kwong Chun-yu (DP)	Kwong Chun-yu (DP)	Wong Yuk-chun (DAB)		Democratic hold
M05	Yuen Long Centre	Siu Long-ming (DAB)	Lam Ting-wai (DA)	Siu Long-ming (DAB)		DAB hold
M06	Yuen Lung	New Seat		Wong Wai-shun (NPP); Chong Kin-shing (BPA)		NPP gain new seat
M07	Fung Cheung	Mak Ip-sing (DA)	Mak Ip-sing (DA)	Yu Chung-leung (DAB)	Wong Wai (Ind)	Democratic Alliance hold
M08	Shap Pat Heung East	Shum Ho-kit (Ind)		Shum Ho-kit (Ind)		Independent uncontested
M09	Shap Pat Heung Central	New Seat		Leung Ming-kin (Ind)		Independent gain new seat
M10	Shap Pat Heung West	Ching Chan-ming (Ind)		Ching Chan-ming (Ind)		Independent uncontested
M11	Ping Shan South	Cheung Muk-lam (NTAS)		Cheung Muk-lam (NTAS)		NTAS uncontested
M12	Ping Shan Central	New Seat		Tang Hing-ip (Ind)		Independent gain new seat
M13	Ping Shan North	Tang Hing-ip (Ind)		Young Ka-on (Ind); Tang Tat-sin (Ind)		Independent gain from Independent
M14	Ha Tsuen	Tang Ka-leung (Ind)		Tang Ka-leung (Ind)	Cheng Kam-ho (Ind)	Independent hold
M15	Tin Shing	Chan Sze-ching (NPP)		Chan Sze-ching (NPP); Leung Yip-pang (Ind)		NPP hold
M16	Shui Oi	Kwok Keung (DAB)		Kwok Keung (DAB)	Chau Tsz-ki (Ind)	DAB hold
M17	Shui Wah	Chow Wing-kan (LP)		Chow Wing-kan (LP); Ko Chun-kit (DAB)		Liberal hold
M18	Chung Wah	Wong Wai-ling (DAB)	Chan Ka-kui (Ind)	Wong Wai-ling (DAB)		DAB hold
M19	Yuet Yan	Chiu Sau-han (Ind)		Chiu Sau-han (Ind)		Independent uncontested
M20	Fu Yan	Lau Kwai-yung (FTU)	Keung Kwok-wai (Lab)	Lau Kwai-yung (FTU)		FTU hold
M21	Yat Chak	Kwok Hing-ping (Ind)		Kwok Hing-ping (Ind); Wong Yu-choi (Ind)	Wong Yuen-fai (Ind)	Independent hold
M22	Tin Heng	Michael Luk Chung-hung (FTU)	Wong Pak-yu (TSWNF)	Michael Luk Chung-hung (FTU)	Cheung Kwok-tung (Ind)	FTU hold
M23	Wang Yat	Yiu Kwok-wai (FTU)		Yiu Kwok-wai (FTU)		FTU uncontested
M24	Ching King	Tang Cheuk-him (FTU)		Tang Cheuk-him (FTU)	So Wing-chau (Ind)	FTU hold
M25	Kingswood North	Lee Yuet-man (Ind)		Lee Yuet-man (Ind)	Polly Ho Wai-fong (Ind)	Independent hold
M26	Tsz Yau	Chan Mei-lin (Ind)	Chan Mei-lin (Ind)	Ching Yung-fai (DAB)		Independent hold
M27	Yiu Yau	New Seat	Agatha Wong Pui-yin (Ind)	Ma Shuk-yin (DAB)		DAB gain new seat
M28	Tin Yiu	Leung Che-cheung (DAB/NTAS)		Leung Che-cheung (DAB/NTAS)	Pliskin Leung Chin-hang (Ind)	DAB/NTAS hold
M29	Kingswood South	Cham Ka-hung (Ind)	Katy Ng Yuk-ying (DP)	Cham Ka-hung (Ind)		Independent hold
M30	Chung Pak	Wong Cheuk-kin (NPP)	Mok Yim-hay (Ind)	Wong Cheuk-kin (NPP)		NPP hold
M31	Fairview Park	Yau Tai-tai (Ind)	To Ka-lun (Ind); Leung Wai-kwan (Ind)	Yau Tai-tai (Ind)		Independent gain from Independent
M32	San Tin	Man Kwong-ming (Ind)		Man Kwong-ming (Ind); Man Kwai-ki (Ind)		Independent hold
M33	Kam Tin	Tang Cheuk-yin (Ind)		Tang Cheuk-yin (Ind)		Independent uncontested
M34	Pat Heung North	Tang Kwai-yau (Ind)		Ronnie Tang Yung-yiu (Ind); Tang Chi-kwong (Ind)		Independent gain from Independent
M35	Pat Heung South	Lai Wai-hung (Ind)	Eddie Chu Hoi-dick (LJL)	Lai Wai-hung (Ind)		Independent hold

=== North ===
Code	Constituency	Incumbent	Pro-democracy Candidate(s)	Pro-Beijing Candidate(s)	Other Candidate(s)	Results
N01	Luen Wo Hui	Law Sai-yan (DP)	Law Sai-yan (DP)	Tsang Hing-lung (DAB); Andy Liu Ming-kin (LP)		DAB gain form Democratic
N02	Fanling Town	George Pang Chun-sing (Ind)		George Pang Chun-sing (Ind)	Wong Chun-ning (TS)	Independent hold
N03	Cheung Wah	Chris Yip Yiu-shing (Ind)	Chan Yuk-ming (DP); Wong Ka-ho (NOTR)	Chris Yip Yiu-shing (Ind)	Feder Yuen Hoi-wai (Ind)	Democratic gain from Independent
N04	Wah Do	Yiu Ming (DAB)		Yiu Ming (DAB)		DAB uncontested
N05	Wah Ming	Lai Sum (DAB)	Chan Wai-tat (ND)	Lai Sum (DAB)		Neo Democrats gain from DAB
N06	Yan Shing	Lau Kwok-fan (DAB)		Lau Kwok-fan (DAB)		DAB uncontested
N07	Shing Fuk	Warwick Wan Wo-tat (FTU)		Warwick Wan Wo-tat (FTU)		FTU uncontested
N08	Fanling South	New Seat		Raymond Ho Shu-kwong (Ind)	Wong Sing-chi (TS)	Independent gain new seat
N09	Ching Ho	Larm Wai-leung (DAB)		Larm Wai-leung (DAB)		DAB uncontested
N10	Yu Tai	Kent Tsang King-chung (FTU)		Kent Tsang King-chung (FTU); Alvan Hau Wing-kong (LP); Shek Fong-yau (Ind)		FTU hold
N11	Sheung Shui Rural	Hau Kam-lam (DAB)		Simon Hau Fuk-tat (Ind); Hau Kam-lam (DAB)		Independent gain from DAB
N12	Choi Yuen	So Sai-chi (DAB)	Clarence Ronald Leung Kam-shing (NDPICG)	So Sai-chi (DAB)		DAB hold
N13	Shek Wu Hui	Simon Wong Yun-keung (DAB)	Lam Cheuk-ting (DP)	Simon Wong Yun-keung (DAB)	Lau Hon-kin (Ind)	Democratic gain from DAB
N14	Tin Ping West	Wong Wang-to (FTU)	Poon Tak-wing (DP); Lee Ching-hei (Civ Passion)	Wong Wang-to (FTU)		FTU hold
N15	Fung Tsui	Liu Kwok-wah (Ind)		Liu Hing-hung (DAB); Liu Kwok-wah (Ind)	Yu Man-kwong (Ind)	DAB gain from Independent
N16	Sha Ta	Wan Wo-fai (DAB)	Cheung Kwai-choi	Wan Wo-fai (DAB); Chu Oi-ping (Ind); Tsang Yuk-on (Ind)		DAB hold
N17	Tin Ping East	Windy Or Sin-yi (DAB)	Lau Ki-fung (DP)	Windy Or Sin-yi (DAB); Paul Yu Chi-shing (Ind)		Democratic gain from DAB
N18	Queen's Hill	Tony Tang Kun-nin (DAB)		Tony Tang Kun-nin (DAB)		DAB uncontested

=== Tai Po ===
Code	Constituency	Incumbent	Pro-democracy Candidate(s)	Pro-Beijing Candidate(s)	Other Candidate(s)	Results
P01	Tai Po Hui	Li Kwok-ying (DAB)	Molly Choy Wing-mui (Ind)	Li Kwok-ying (DAB)		DAB hold
P02	Tai Po Central	Au Chun-wah (DP)	Au Chun-wah (DP)	Mui Siu-fung (DAB)	Man Wai-keung (Ind)	Democratic hold
P03	Chung Ting	Eric Tam Wing-fun (DAB)	Lui Nok (DP)	Eric Tam Wing-fun (DAB)		DAB hold
P04	Tai Yuen	Cheng Chun-ping (DAB)	Au Chun-ho (DP)	Cheng Chun-ping (DAB)		DAB hold
P05	Fu Heng	Wong Chau-pak (DAB)	Yam Man-chuen (Ind)	Wong Chau-pak (DAB)		Independent gain from DAB
P06	Yee Fu	Yam Kai-bong (ND)	Yam Kai-bong (ND)	Cheung Fung-yin (DAB)		Neo Democrats hold
P07	Fu Ming Sun	Kwan Wing-yip (ND)	Kwan Wing-yip (ND)	Chan Yung-wa (FTU)		Neo Democrats hold
P08	Kwong Fuk & Plover Cove	Lam Chuen (DAB)	Benjamin Chow (Ind)	Peggy Wong Pik-kiu (DAB)	Kwok Shu-yan (Ind)	DAB hold
P09	Wang Fuk	Peggy Wong Pik-kiu (DAB)	Man Nim-chi (DP)	Clement Woo Kin-man (DAB)		DAB hold
P10	Tai Po Kau	Chan Siu-kuen (Ind)		Chan Siu-kuen (Ind)		Independent uncontested
P11	Wan Tau Tong	Yu Chi-wing (Ind)	Cheng Wai (Ind)	Yu Chi-wing (Ind)		Independent hold
P12	San Fu	Kwok Wing-kin (Lab)	Kwok Wing-kin (Lab)	Lo Hiu-fung (Ind)	Wu Kam-fai (Ind)	Independent gain from Labour
P13	Lam Tsuen Valley	Chan Cho-leung (BPA)		Chan Cho-leung (BPA); Lam Chun-cheung (Ind); Wan Yuk-wing (Ind)		BPA hold
P14	Po Nga	Wong Yung-kan (DAB)	Chow Yuen-wai (ND)	Wong Yung-kan (DAB)		Neo Democrats gain from DAB
P15	Tai Wo	Cheng Chun-wo (Ind)		Cheng Chun-wo (Ind)		Independent uncontested
P16	Old Market & Serenity	Cheung Kwok-wai (DAB)	Lau Yung-wai (Ind)	Cheung Kwok-wai (DAB)		Independent gain from DAB
P17	Hong Lok Yuen	Tang Yau-fat (Ind)		Patrick Tang Ming-tai (Ind); Man Chen-fai (BPA)		Independent gain from Independent
P18	Shuen Wan	Lau Chee-sing (Ind)		Lau Chee-sing (Ind)		Independent uncontested
P19	Sai Kung North	David Ho Tai-wai (BPA)		Rex Li Wah-kwong (BPA); Victor Lee Kwai-yau (Ind)		BPA hold

=== Sai Kung ===
Code	Constituency	Incumbent	Pro-democracy Candidate(s)	Pro-Beijing Candidate(s)	Other Candidate(s)	Results
Q01	Sai Kung Central	Ng Sze-fuk (DAB)		Ng Sze-fuk (DAB)	Alan Cheung Sze-kit (Ind)	DAB hold
Q02	Pak Sha Wan	Hiew Moo-siew (DAB)		Hiew Moo-siew (DAB)	Po Wai-ming (Ind)	DAB hold
Q03	Sai Kung Islands	Philip Li Ka-leung (DAB)		Philip Li Ka-leung (DAB)		DAB uncontested
Q04	Hang Hau East	Peter Lau Wai-cheung (Ind)		Peter Lau Wai-cheung (Ind)	Newman Lau Man-choi (Ind)	Independent hold
Q05	Hang Hau West	Yau Yuk-lun (DAB)		Yau Yuk-lun (DAB)	Luk Sau-ching (Ind)	DAB hold
Q06	Po Yee	Ng Shuet-shan (FTU)	Tse Ching-fung (DP)	Ng Shuet-shan (FTU)		Democratic gain from FTU
Q07	Wai King	Chan Kai-wai (Ind)			Chan Kai-wai (Ind); Jack Wong Shing-kwong (Ind)	Independent hold
Q08	Do Shin	New Seat	Andrew Shuen Pak-man (Ind); So Ho (PP/TF)	Ruby Mok (Ind)	Cheung Chin-pang (Ind)	Independent gain new seat
Q09	Kin Ming	Leung Li (ND)	Leung Li (ND)	Chau Ka-lok (DAB)		Neo Democrats hold
Q10	Choi Kin	Raymond Ho Man-kit (Ind)	Raymond Ho Man-kit (Ind)	Jacob Ng (DAB)		Independent hold
Q11	O Tong	Cheung Kwok-keung (ND)	Lui Man-kwong (ND)	Ko Wing-luen (FTU)	Au Yeung Ho-kwan (Ind)	Neo Democrats hold
Q12	Fu Kwan	Luk Ping-choi (Ind)	Luk Ping-choi (Ind)		Kim Lui Kim-ho (Ind); Shek Yuen-hon (Ind)	Independent hold
Q13	Kwan Po	New Seat	Lai Ming-chak (ND); Cyrus Chan Chin-chun (Ind); Lee Kwok-pui (Ind)	Antony Lee Sun (Ind)	Wong Tin-yau (Ind)	Neo Democrats gain new seat
Q14	Nam On	Francis Chau Yin-ming (Ind)	Francis Chau Yin-ming (Ind)	Yu Kai-chun (FTU)		Independent hold
Q15	Hong King	Frankie Lam Siu-chung (DP)	Frankie Lam Siu-chung (DP)	Ken Chan Kin-chun (CF/NPP)		Democratic hold
Q16	Tsui Lam	Lanny Tam (NPP/CF)	Chan Yuen-pan (Ind)	Lanny Tam (NPP/CF)		NPP/CF hold
Q17	Po Lam	Alfred Au Ning-fat (NPP/CF)	Cheung Chi-tung (DP)	Alfred Au Ning-fat (NPP/CF); Rocky Wong Lok-yin (LP)		NPP/CF hold
Q18	Yan Ying	Ben Chung Kam-lun (ND)	Ben Chung Kam-lun (ND)	Harris Yeung Ho-chuen (LP); Michael Liu Tsz-chung (NPP/CF)		Neo Democrats hold
Q19	Wan Hang	Gary Fan Kwok-wai (ND)	Gary Fan Kwok-wai (ND)	Sun Wai-kei (Ind)	Lai Tze-wah (Ind)	Neo Democrats hold
Q20	King Lam	Lam Wing-yin (DP)	Lam Wing-yin (DP)	Wan Kai-ming (DAB)		DAB gain from Democratic
Q21	Hau Tak	Ling Man-hoi (DAB)	Tsang Ho-man (DP)	Ling Man-hoi (DAB)		DAB hold
Q22	Fu Nam	Chan Kwok-Kai (DAB)	Chan Yiu-ming (Ind Dem)	Chan Pok-chi (DAB)		DAB hold
Q23	Tak Ming	Wan Yuet-cheung (NPP/CF)		Wan Yuet-cheung (NPP/CF)		NPP/CF uncontested
Q24	Sheung Tak	Kan Siu-kei (FTU)	Wong Fai (PP/TF)	Kan Siu-kei (FTU); Choi Kin-ching (Ind)		FTU hold
Q25	Kwong Ming	Chong Yuen-tung (DAB)	Choi Ming-hei (Ind Dem)	Chong Yuen-tung (DAB)	Simon Shi Hau-kit (Ind)	DAB hold
Q26	Wan Po North	New Seat		Chui Ting-pong (LP)	Christine Fong Kwok-shan (Ind)	Independent hold
Q27	Wan Po South	New Seat		Wu Cheuk-him (DAB)	Cheung Mei-hung (Ind)	Independent gain new seat

=== Sha Tin ===
Code	Constituency	Incumbent	Pro-democracy Candidate(s)	Pro-Beijing Candidate(s)	Other Candidate(s)	Results
R01	Sha Tin Town Centre	Wai Hing-cheung (Ind)	Wai Hing-cheung (Ind Dem)	Alf Wong Chi-yung (DAB)		Independent hold
R02	Lek Yuen	Wong Yue-hon (CF/NPP)	Wong Ho-ming (LSD)	Wong Yue-hon (CF/NPP)		Civil Force/NPP hold
R03	Wo Che Estate	Anna Yue Shin-man (DAB)	Deco Lee Wai-fung (PP)	Anna Yue Shin-man (DAB); Lee Tak-wah (Ind)		DAB hold
R04	City One	Wong Ka-wing (NPP)		Wong Ka-wing (NPP)		NPP uncontested
R05	Yue Shing	Leung Ka-fai (NPP/CF)		Leung Ka-fai (NPP/CF)		NPP/CF uncontested
R06	Wong Uk	Leung Chi-wai (LP)	Lai Tsz-yan (Ind)	Leung Chi-wai (LP)		Independent gain from Liberal
R07	Sha Kok	Yeung Sin-hung (NPP/CF)	Billy Chan Shiu-yeung (ND)	Yeung Sin-hung (NPP/CF)		Neo Democrats gain from NPP/CF
R08	Pok Hong	Chan Kwok-tim (CF/NPP)	Chiu Chu-pong (ND)	Chan Kwok-tim (CF/NPP)		Neo Democrats gain from CF/NPP
R09	Jat Min	Yau Man-chun (ND)	Yau Man-chun (ND)	Michael Yip Ka-ming (NPP/CF); Chau Ping-him (BPA)		Neo Democrats hold
R10	Chun Fung	Chan Nok-hang (DP)	Chan Nok-hang (DP)	Leung Ka-wai (NPP/CF)		Democratic hold
R11	Sun Tin Wai	Ching Cheung-ying (DP)	Ching Cheung-ying (DP)	Li Lok-yan (FTU)		Democratic hold
R12	Chui Tin	Philip Wong Chak-piu (CF/NPP)	Hui Yui-yu (ND)	Philip Wong Chak-piu (CF/NPP)		Neo Democrats gain from Civil Force/NPP
R13	Hin Ka	Lam Chung-yan (CF/NPP)	Mok Wai-hung (DP)	Lam Chung-yan (CF/NPP)		Civil Force/NPP hold
R14	Lower Shing Mun	Ho Hau-cheung (NPP/CF)		Tong Hok-leung (NPP/CF); Sherman Chong Yiu-kan (Ind)	Lee Yuen-kam (Ind)	NPP/CF hold
R15	Wan Shing	New Seat	Wong Leung-hi (Ind Dem); Cheung Tak-wing (Ind)	Ho Hau-cheung (NPP/CF)		NPP/CF gain new seat
R16	Keng Hau	Ng Kam-hung (DP)	Ng Kam-hung (DP)	George Ho Kwok-wah (CF/NPP)		Democratic hold
R17	Tin Sum	Pun Kwok-shan (NPP/CF)		Pun Kwok-shan (NPP/CF)		NPP/CF uncontested
R18	Chui Ka	Lee Kam-ming (Ind)	Li Sai-hung (ND)	Lee Kam-ming (Ind); Wai Tak-lun (NPP/CF)		Neo Democrats gain from Independent
R19	Tai Wai	Tung Kin-lei (DAB)	Leung Chun-hin (STCN)	Tung Kin-lei (DAB)		DAB hold
R20	Chung Tin	Tang Wing-cheong (CF/NPP)	Wong Hok-lai (STCN)	Tang Wing-cheong (CF/NPP); Lo Yuet-chau (Ind)		Sha Tin Community Network gain from CF/NPP
R21	Sui Wo	Thomas Pang Cheung-wai (DAB)	Yau Chi-kin (Civ)	Thomas Pang Cheung-wai (DAB)	Lisa Li Sui-ha (Ind)	DAB hold
R22	Fo Tan	Scarlett Pong Oi-lan (Ind)	Chan Man-fai (Civ)	Scarlett Pong Oi-lan (Ind)		Independent hold
R23	Chun Ma	Siu Hin-hong (Ind)		Siu Hin-hong (Ind); Ronald Ho Wai-lok (LP)	Cheng Wing-chung (Ind)	Independent hold
R24	Chung On	Elizabeth Quat (DAB)	Yip Wing (Lab)	Elizabeth Quat (DAB)		Labour gain from DAB
R25	Kam To	Gary Yeung Man-yui (DAB)	James Chan Kwok-keung (Ind)	Gary Yeung Man-yui (DAB)		Independent gain from DAB
R26	Ma On Shan Town Centre	Alvin Lee Chi-wing (Ind)	Man Chi-wai (Ind Dem)	Alvin Lee Chi-wing (Ind)		Independent hold
R27	Lee On	Chris Mak Yun-pui (PD)	Chris Mak Yun-pui (PD)	Ada Lo Tai-suen (DAB)	Kong Cheuk-wai (Ind)	PfD hold
R28	Fu Lung	Law Kwong-keung (CF/NPP)	Tsang So-lai (DP)	Law Kwong-keung (CF/NPP)		Democratic gain from CF/NPP
R29	Wu Kai Sha	New Seat	Li Wing-shing (DP)	Devin Sio Chan-in (DAB)		Democratic gain new seat
R30	Kam Ying	Tong Po-chun (Ind)	Ting Tsz-yuen (DP)	Tong Po-chun (Ind); Li Po-mui (Ind)	Law Siu-chung (Ind)	Democratic gain from Independent
R31	Yiu On	Li Sai-wing (DAB)		Li Sai-wing (DAB)	Cheung Pik-ha (Ind)	DAB hold
R32	Heng On	Cheng Tsuk-man (DP)	Cheng Tsuk-man (DP)	Lam Tak-wai (FTU)		Democratic hold
R33	On Tai	Chiu Man-leung (DAB)	Donna Yau Yuet-wah (DP)	Chiu Man-leung (DAB)		DAB hold
R34	Tai Shui Hang	Michael Yung Ming-chau (Ind)	Michael Yung Ming-chau (Ind)	Cheung Chi-yin (DAB)		Independent hold
R35	Yu Yan	Yiu Ka-chun (NPP/CF)		Yiu Ka-chun (NPP/CF)		NPP/CF uncontested
R36	Bik Woo	Lau Wai-lun (Ind)	Emily Oi-ming Owen (Ind)	Wong Ping-fan (DAB); Lau Wai-lun (Ind)		DAB gain from Independent
R37	Kwong Hong	Cheng Cho-kwong (DAB)	Ng Wai-ling (Lab)	Wong Fu-sang (DAB); Paul Choi Chun-chiu (Ind)		DAB hold
R38	Kwong Yuen	Chan Man-kuen (NPP/CF)	Sung Tsz-ming (Lab)	Chan Man-kuen (NPP/CF)		NPP/CF hold

=== Kwai Tsing ===
Code	Constituency	Incumbent	Pro-democracy Candidate(s)	Pro-Beijing Candidate(s)	Other Candidate(s)	Results
S01	Kwai Hing	Leung Chi-shing (NWSC)	Leung Chi-shing (NWSC)	Leung Chi-ho (FTU)		NWSC hold
S02	Kwai Shing East Estate	Rayman Chow Wai-hung (NWSC)	Rayman Chow Wai-hung (NWSC)	Mo Sang-tung (DAB); Leung Kwong-cheong (Ind)	Chan Yuk-ling (Ind)	NWSC hold
S03	Upper Tai Wo Hau	Hui Kei-cheung (DP)	Hui Kei-cheung (DP)	Lau Chin-pang (FTU)		Democratic hold
S04	Lower Tai Wo Hau	Wong Bing-kuen (DP)	Wong Bing-kuen (DP)	Cheung Wai-man (FTU)		Democratic hold
S05	Kwai Chung Estate North	Leung Kam-wai (NWSC)	Leung Kam-wai (NWSC)	Leung Kong-ming (DAB)		NWSC hold
S06	Kwai Chung Estate South	Wong Yun-tat (NWSC)	Wong Yun-tat (NWSC)	Lee Wan-fung (DAB)		NWSC hold
S07	Shek Yam	Andrew Wan Siu-kin (DP)	Andrew Wan Siu-kin (DP)	Li Sai-lung (DAB)		DAB gain from Democratic
S08	On Yam	Dennis Leung Tsz-wing (FTU)	Leung Wing-kuen (DP)	Dennis Leung Tsz-wing (FTU)		FTU hold
S09	Shek Lei South	Leung Kwok-wah (DP)	Leung Kwok-wah (DP)	Ng Ka-chiu (NPP)		NPP gain from Democratic
S10	Shek Lei North	Lam Siu-fai (DP)	Lam Siu-fai (DP)	Cheung Ip-mei (DAB)		Democratic hold
S11	Tai Pak Tin	Sammy Tsui Sang-hung (DP)	Sammy Tsui Sang-hung (DP)	Kwok Fu-yung (DAB)		DAB gain from Democratic
S12	Kwai Fong	Leung Yiu-chung (NWSC)	Leung Yiu-chung (NWSC)	Chan Man-luen-ying (FLU)		NWSC hold
S13	Wah Lai	Wong Yiu-chung (BPA)		Wong Yiu-chung (BPA)	Christabel Donna Tai Pui-shan (Ind); Yuen Kwok-ki (Ind)	BPA hold
S14	Lai Wah	Chu Lai-ling (DAB)		Chu Lai-ling (DAB)		DAB uncontested
S15	Cho Yiu	Lo Wai-lan (BPA)	Chan Tak-cheung (LSD)	Pau Ming-hong (DAB); Lo Wai-lan (BPA)		DAB gain from BPA
S16	Hing Fong	Ng Kim-sing (DP)	Ng Kim-sing (DP)	Leung Kar-ming (DAB)		Democratic hold
S17	Lai King	Chow Yick-hay (Ind)	Chow Yick-hay (Ind)			Independent uncontested
S18	Kwai Shing West Estate	Lau Mei-lo (FTU)	Leung Ching-shan (NWSC)	Lau Mei-lo (FTU)		FTU hold
S19	On Ho	Tam Wai-chun (BPA)	Lau Siu-hang (DP)	Tam Wai-chun (BPA)		BPA hold
S20	Wai Ying	Alice Mak Mei-kuen (FTU)		Alice Mak Mei-kuen (FTU)		FTU uncontested
S21	Tsing Yi Estate	Simon Chan Siu-man (Ind)	Simon Chan Siu-man (Ind)	Elaine Cheng Hiu-ling	Uny Chiu Chit-ue (Ind); Yu Lap-on (Ind)	Independent hold
S22	Greenfield	Clarice Cheung Wai-ching (Ind)		Clarice Cheung Wai-ching (Ind); Nancy Poon Siu-ping (Ind)		Independent hold
S23	Cheung Ching	Alan Lee Chi-keung (BPA)	Wong Kwong-mo (DP)	Alan Lee Chi-keung (BPA)		BPA hold
S24	Cheung Hong	Tsui Hiu-kit (NPP)		Tsui Hiu-kit (NPP)		NPP uncontested
S25	Shing Hong	Leung Wai-man (DAB)	Ferdinand Fu Moon-fong (Ind)	Leung Wai-man (DAB)		DAB hold
S26	Tsing Yi South	Poon Chi-shing (DAB)	Jonathan Ip Yam-shek (Youngspiration)	Poon Chi-shing (DAB)		DAB hold
S27	Cheung Hang	Lam Lap-chi (DP)	Lam Lap-chi (DP)	Lo Yuen-ting (DAB); Lui Ko-wai (Ind)	Ha Lung-wan (Ind)	DAB gain from Democratic
S28	Ching Fat	Nancy Poon Siu-ping (Ind)	Lau Chi-kit (DP); Lee Hon-sam (CFLC)	Nancy Lam Chui-ling (Ind)	Wong Kin-long (Ind)	Independent gain from Independent
S29	Cheung On	Law King-shing (DAB)	Ho Chi-wai (DP); Wong Chun-kit (Youngspiration)	Law King-shing (DAB)		DAB hold

=== Islands ===
Code	Constituency	Incumbent	Pro-democracy Candidate(s)	Pro-Beijing Candidate(s)	Other Candidate(s)	Results
T01	Lantau	Wong Fuk-kan (Ind)		Randy Yu Hon-kwan (Ind)	Yuen Yuk-wah (Ind); Lau King-cheung (Ind); Tam Sau-ngor (Ind)	Independent gain from Independent
T02	Yat Tung Estate North	Tang Ka-piu (FTU)	Jimmy Leung Hon-wai (Ind)	Tang Ka-piu (FTU)		FTU hold
T03	Yat Tung Estate South	Andy Lo Kwong-shing (DAB)	Kwok Ping (DP)	Andy Lo Kwong-shing (DAB)		Democratic gain form DAB
T04	Tung Chung North	Peter Yu Chun-cheung (Civ)	Peter Yu Chun-cheung (Civ)	Sammi Fu Hiu-lam (NPP)		NPP gain from Civic
T05	Tung Chung South	Chau Chuen-heung (DAB)	Wong Chun-yeung (Ind)	Holden Chow Ho-ding (DAB)		DAB hold
T06	Discovery Bay	Amy Yung Wing-sheung (Civ)	Amy Yung Wing-sheung (Civ)	Francis Chiu Tak-wai (Ind)	Jimmy Hu Ziliang (Ind)	Civic hold
T07	Peng Chau & Hei Ling Chau	Josephine Tsang Sau-ho (Ind)		Josephine Tsang Sau-ho (Ind)		Independent uncontested
T08	Lamma & Po Toi	Yu Lai-fan (DAB)		Yu Lai-fan (DAB)		DAB uncontested
T09	Cheung Chau South	Kwong Koon-wan (BPA)		Kwok Koon-wan (BPA); Lam Kit-sing (Ind)	Leung Kwok-ho (Ind)	BPA hold
T10	Cheung Chau North	Lee Kwai-chun (DAB)		Lee Kwai-chun (DAB)	Kwong Wai-kuen (Ind)	DAB hold

== See also ==
- 2015 Hong Kong local elections
