= List of Hong Kong by-elections =

This is a list of by-elections in Hong Kong, with the names of the incumbent and victor and their respective parties.

== Legislative Council by-elections ==
According to Legislative Council Ordinance, "a by-election to fill a vacancy occurring in the membership of the Legislative Council is not to be held within the 4 months preceding the end of that Council’s current term of office." However, there is no statutory requirement over when shall a by-election be held after a seat is declared vacant.

The following vacancies did not trigger by-election:

- occurred within 4 months before nomination period of general election: Ambrose Cheung in 1999, Au Nok-hin in 2019, Gary Fan in 2019, Ho Kai-ming in 2020
- occurred during nomination period of general election: Paul Chan in 2012
- occurred during public health emergency: Chan Hoi-yan, Raymond Chan, Eddie Chu, Tanya Chan, Alvin Yeung, Dennis Kwok, Kwok Ka-ki, Kenneth Leung, Ted Hui, Claudia Mo, Helena Wong, Wu Chi-wai, Andrew Wan, Lam Cheuk-ting, Roy Kwong, James To, Jeremy Tam, Charles Mok, Fernando Cheung, Leung Yiu-chung, Ip Kin-yuen, Joseph Lee, Shiu Ka-chun in 2020
- legal matters unresolved: Leung Kwok-hung in 2020
- unexplained: Stephen Wong in 2022

=== SAR Legislative Council (1998 to present) ===
Constituency	Date	Incumbent	Party	Winner	Party	Cause
7th Legislative Council
Election Committee	18 December 2022	Horace Cheung	DAB	Chan Wing-kwong	DAB	Resigned after appointed as government officials
Election Committee	18 December 2022	Alice Mak	FTU	Adrian Ho	NPP	Resigned after appointed as government officials
Election Committee	18 December 2022	Dong Sun	Nonpartisan	Shang Hailong	Nonpartisan	Resigned after appointed as government officials
Election Committee	18 December 2022	Nelson Lam	Nonpartisan	William Wong	Nonpartisan	Resigned after appointed as government officials
6th Legislative Council
Kowloon West	25 November 2018	Lau Siu-lai	Nonpartisan	Chan Hoi-yan	Nonpartisan	Disqualified over oath-taking manner
Architectural, Surveying, Planning and Landscape	11 March 2018	Yiu Chung-yim	Nonpartisan	Tony Tse	Nonpartisan	Disqualified over oath-taking manner
Hong Kong Island	11 March 2018	Nathan Law	Demosisto	Au Nok-hin	Independent	Disqualified over oath-taking manner
New Territories East	11 March 2018	Sixtus Leung	Youngspiration	Gary Fan	Neo Democrats	Disqualified over oath-taking manner
Kowloon West	11 March 2018	Yau Wai-ching	Youngspiration	Vincent Cheng	DAB	Disqualified over oath-taking manner
5th Legislative Council
New Territories East	28 February 2016	Ronny Tong	Nonpartisan	Alvin Yeung	Civic	Resigned
4th Legislative Council
Hong Kong Island	16 May 2010	Tanya Chan	Civic	Tanya Chan	Civic	Resigned and sought re-election
Kowloon West	16 May 2010	Wong Yuk-man	LSD	Wong Yuk-man	LSD	Resigned and sought re-election
Kowloon East	16 May 2010	Alan Leong	Civic	Alan Leong	Civic	Resigned and sought re-election
New Territories West	16 May 2010	Albert Chan	LSD	Albert Chan	LSD	Resigned and sought re-election
New Territories East	16 May 2010	Leung Kwok-hung	LSD	Leung Kwok-hung	LSD	Resigned and sought re-election
3rd Legislative Council
Hong Kong Island	2 December 2007	Ma Lik	DAB	Anson Chan	Independent	Death (cancer)
2nd Legislative Council
Election Committee	16 September 2001	Ng Ching-fai	New Forum	Ma Fung-kwok	New Forum	Resigned to take the office of President of the Hong Kong Baptist University
Hong Kong Island	10 December 2000	Cheng Kai-nam	DAB	Audrey Eu	Independent	Declined the seat as a result of a corruption scandal
1st Legislative Council
Regional Council	29 October 1998	Tang Siu-tong	HKPA	Tang Siu-tong	HKPA	Void election
Financial Services	16 October 1998	Chim Pui-chung	Nonpartisan	Fung Chi-kin	HKPA	Impeached after being convicted for conspiring to forge documents

=== Provisional Legislative Council (1997–1998) ===
Constituency	Date	Incumbent	Party	Winner	Party	Cause
Selection Committee	7–8 July 1997	Maria Tam	HKPA	Choy So-yuk	HKPA	Resigned to take the seat in the HKSAR Basic Law Committee of the NPCSC

=== Colonial Legislative Council (1985–1997) ===
Constituency	Date	Incumbent	Party	Winner	Party	Cause
Kowloon Central	5 March 1995	Lau Chin-shek	United Democrats/CTU	Lee Cheuk-yan	CTU	Resigned in protest
Regional Council	28 July 1993	Gilbert Leung	FSHK	Alfred Tso	LDF	Removed from seat after being found guilty of bribery
Industrial (First)	15 July 1993	Stephen Cheong	BPF	James Tien	BPF	Death (heart attack)
New Territories West	30 August 1992	Ng Ming-yum	Meeting Point	Tang Siu-tong	Nonpartisan	Death (cancer)
New Territories West	8 December 1991	Tai Chin-wah	FSHK	Zachary Wong	Meeting Point	Resigned after the forging credentials scandal
Regional Council	5 June 1986	N/A		Lau Wong-fat	Nonpartisan	Constituency newly created

== Urban Council by-elections ==
Constituency	Date	Incumbent	Party	Winner	Party	Cause
Yau Tsim	6 October 1988	Kwan Lim-ho	Reform	Lee Wing-na	Reform	Disqualified
N/A	25 June 1964	Chan Shu-woon	Independent	Solomon Rafeek	Independent	Resigned
N/A	12 June 1957	Brook Bernacchi	Reform	Brook Bernacchi	Reform	Resigned

== Regional Council by-elections ==
Constituency	Date	Incumbent	Party	Winner	Party	Cause
Tune Mun West	4 December 1994	Chow Yick-kay	Democratic	Leung Kwong-cheong	Democratic	Resigned
Sai Kung	8 August 1993	Gilbert Leung Kam-ho	FSHK	Lam Wing-yin	United Democrats	Convicted
Tuen Mun West	8 August 1993	Ng Ming-yum	Meeting Point/UDHK	Yim Tin-sang	ADPL	Death
Islands	22 February 1990	Kwong Ping-yau	Independent	Fung Puk-tai	Independent	Death

== District Council by-elections ==
=== 5th District Councils (2016 to 2019) ===
Constituency	Date	Incumbent	Party	Winner	Party	Cause
Shap Pat Heung West	14 July 2019	Ching Chan-ming	Independent	Leung Fuk-yuen	Independent	Elected as Chairman of Shap Pat Heung Rural Committee
San Tin	14 July 2019	Man Kwong-ming	Independent	Man Ka-koy	Independent	Imprisoned
Tai Nan	24 March 2019	Francis Chong Wing-charn	KWND/BPA	Li Sze-man	BPA	Death
Kai Hiu	10 June 2018	Alice Lam Chui-lin	Independent	Elaine Chik Kit-ling	DAB/FTU	Death
Tung Wah	26 November 2017	Siu Ka-yi	DAB	Bonnie Ng Hoi-yan	Democratic	Resigned
Peak	26 November 2017	Joseph Chan Ho-lim	Liberal	Jeremy Young Chit-on	Liberal	Resigned

=== 4th District Councils (2012–2015) ===
Constituency	Date	Incumbent	Party	Winner	Party	Cause
San Fu	19 July 2015	Lo Sou-chour	BPA	Kwok Wing-kin	Labour	Imprisoned
Peng Chau and Hei Ling Chau	7 September 2014	On Hing-ying	Independent	Josephine Tsang Sau-ho	Independent	Death
Nam Fung	18 May 2014	Leung Suk-ching	Democratic	Cheung Kwok-cheong	Democratic	Unseated for long absence
Tung Chung North	27 April 2014	Lam Yuet	Independent	Peter Yu Chun-cheung	Civic	Imprisoned
South Horizons West	23 March 2014	Fung Wai-kwong	Independent	Judy Kapui Chan	NPP	Resigned
King's Park	23 March 2014	Edward Leung Wai-kuen	Independent	Lam Kin-man	ADPL	Void election
Ping Shek	26 May 2013	Bernard Chan Pak-li	DAB	Chan Chun-kit	DAB	Resigned
Tin Sum	10 March 2013	Lau Kong-wah	DAB/CF	Pun Kwok-shan	Civil Force	Resigned
On Tai	4 November 2012	Yeung Chueng-li	DAB	Chiu Man-leong	DAB	Unseated over bankruptcy

=== 3rd District Councils (2008–2011) ===
Constituency	Date	Incumbent	Party	Winner	Party	Cause
Fuk Loi	24 July 2011	Chiu Ka-po	Democratic	Kot Siu-yuen	FTU	Death
Shap Pat Heung North	6 June 2011	Leung Fuk-yuen	Independent	Shum Ho-kit	Independent	Elected as Chairman of Shap Pat Heung Rural Committee
Pokfulam	5 September 2011	Chan Ngok-pang	Independent	Paulus Johannes Zimmerman	Civic	Resigned
Kwai Shing East Estate	6 September 2009	Leung Kwong-cheong	Independent	Lai Fan-fong	Independent	Imprisoned
Canal Road	21 June 2009	Lee Kai-hung	Independent	Jacqueline Chung Ka-man	DAB	Imprisoned
Tai Wai	29 March 2009	Yuen Kwai-choi	DAB	Leung Wing-hung	Democratic	Void election
Tsz Wan West	30 November 2008	Tam Yuet-ping	Democratic	Yuen Kwok-keung	DAB	Death
Jordan East	5 October 2008	Lau Chi-wing	DAB	Chris Ip Ngo-tung	DAB	Death

=== 2nd District Councils (2004–2007) ===
Constituency	Date	Incumbent	Party	Winner	Party	Cause
Hung Hom Bay	29 July 2007	Virginia Fung King-man	Democratic	Cheung Yan-hong	Independent	Imprisoned
Hong Lok Yuen	10 June 2007	Man Chun-fai	Independent	Tang Yau-fat	Independent	Elected as Chairman of Tai Po Rural Committee
Kai Yip	20 May 2007	Au Yuk-har	Democratic	Sze Lun-hung	DAB	Death
Kam Ying	11 March 2007	Wong Kwok-hung	Frontier	Tong Po-chun	Independent	Imprisoned
Tsui Wan	10 September 2006	Tang Lai-ming	Independent	Ku Kwai-yiu	Independent	Unseated over bankruptcy
Centre Street	11 June 2006	Henry Leung Yiu-cho	Democratic	Sidney Lee Chi-hang	Independent	Death
King Tin	11 June 2006	Ng Chung-tak	Liberal	Cheung Shun-wah	Independent	Imprisoned
Ap Lei Chau North	20 March 2005	Wong King-cheung	Independent	Cheung Sik-yung	Independent	Death
Nam Cheong Central	20 March 2005	Tai Yuen-ming	ADPL	Raymond Cheung Man-to	DAB	Imprisoned
Fort Street	6 March 2005	Vacant		Hung Lin-cham	DAB	Void election
Tin Wan	21 November 2004	Miu Wah-chang	DAB	Chan Fu-ming	Independent	Disqualified

=== 1st District Councils (2000–2003) ===
Constituency	Date	Incumbent	Party	Winner	Party	Cause
Lai Kok	3 August 2003	Eric Wong Chung-ki	Democratic	Tracy Lai Wai-lan	ADPL	Convicted
Mei Foo	6 April 2003	Tsang Yau-fat	DAB	Joe Wong Tak-chuen	Democratic	Disqualified over long absence
Hoi Sham	6 April 2003	Mak King-lun	HKPA	Pun Kwok-wah	DAB	Death
Kai Tak	3 November 2002	David Chu Chor-sing	HKPA	Liu Sing-lee	ADPL	Death
Fung Tsui	23 July 2000	Liu Chiu-wah	DAB	Liu Chiu-wah	DAB	Void election

== District Board by-elections ==
=== 5th District Boards (1994–1997) ===
Constituency	Date	Incumbent	Party	Winner	Party	Cause
Shuen Wan	23 February 1997	Chan Koon-yau	Independent	Chan Mei-tak	DAB	Convicted
San Po Kong	5 January 1997	Chan Yuet-suk	EKDRC	Lee Tat-yan	EKDRC	Death
Kam Ping	31 March 1996	Keung Yuk-deoil	Independent	Tsang On-kei	Independent	Convicted
Siu Hei	24 March 1996	Ng Wai-cho	123DA	Yim Tin-sang	ADPL	Resigned
Tin King	3 March 1996	Lee Man-kwong	Democratic	Lothar Lee Hung-sham	DAB	Resigned
Lai Wah	2 April 1995	Wong Yiu-chung	Democratic	Wong Yiu-chung	Democratic	Void election
Lower Ngau Tau Kok	5 March 1995	Chan Kwok-wah	DAB	Wong Kin-man	Democratic	Void election
Yau Ma Tei	5 March 1995	Chiu Kam-hoi	ADPL	Austen Ng Po-shan	ADPL	Death

=== 4th District Boards (1991–1994) ===
Constituency	Date	Incumbent	Party	Winner	Party	Cause
Wong Uk	5 December 1993	Wong Fuk-wah	Meeting Point	Wong Yiu-sang	United Democrats	Resigned
Tai Hing	11 October 1992	Ng Ming-yum	Meeting Point/UDHK	Ho Hang-mui	United Democrats	Death
Pak Tin	24 May 1992	Cheng Hok-chit	ADPL	Yan Kai-wing	ADPL	Resigned
Yuen Wo	24 May 1992	Cheung Chi-yuen	United Democrats	Tony Kan Chun-nin	Independent	Resigned
Shun Lee	21 April 1991	Vacant		Tam Yiu-wang	United Democrats	Void election
Shun Lee	21 April 1991	Vacant		Ho Suk-yee	United Democrats	Void election

=== 3rd District Boards (1988–1991) ===
Constituency	Date	Incumbent	Party	Winner	Party	Cause
Tsing Yi South	19 October 1989	Lee Chi-fai	TYCG	Tse Wai-ming	TYCG	Resigned
Pak Tin	20 April 1989	Ha Siu-kwong	Reform	Sa Mei-ching	Independent	Convicted
Tsuen Wan East (North)	6 October 1988	Yeung Fuk-kwong	PHKS	Yeung Fuk-kwong	PHKS	Disqualified

=== 2nd District Boards (1985–1988) ===
Constituency	Date	Incumbent	Party	Winner	Party	Cause
Ho Man Tin South	16 October 1986	Lee Wai-hau	Independent	Chiang Sai-cheong	Independent	Resigned
Chung Wan	22 May 1986	Chow Wai-keung	HKAS	Yuen Bun-keung	Independent	Elected as Urban Councillor
Tai Kok Tsui	22 May 1986	Chow Kwok-ming	Independent	Lai Siu-nin	Independent	Elected as Urban Councillor

=== 1st District Boards (1982–1985) ===
Constituency	Date	Incumbent	Party	Winner	Party	Cause
Wan Chai West	17 August 1983	Ng Sai-ying	Independent	Chung Yee-on	Independent	Death
Quarry Bay	12 May 1983	Kwan Lim-ho	Reform	Joseph Salaroli	Independent	Elected as Urban Councillor
Tin Wan & Shek Pai Wan	12 May 1983	Joseph Chan Yuet-sut	Civic	Tse Kit-to	Independent	Elected as Urban Councillor
