= 1998 Hong Kong Regional Council (constituency) by-election =

1998 Regional Council by-election
← 1998	29 October 1998	2000 →
- Registered: 50
- Turnout: 100%

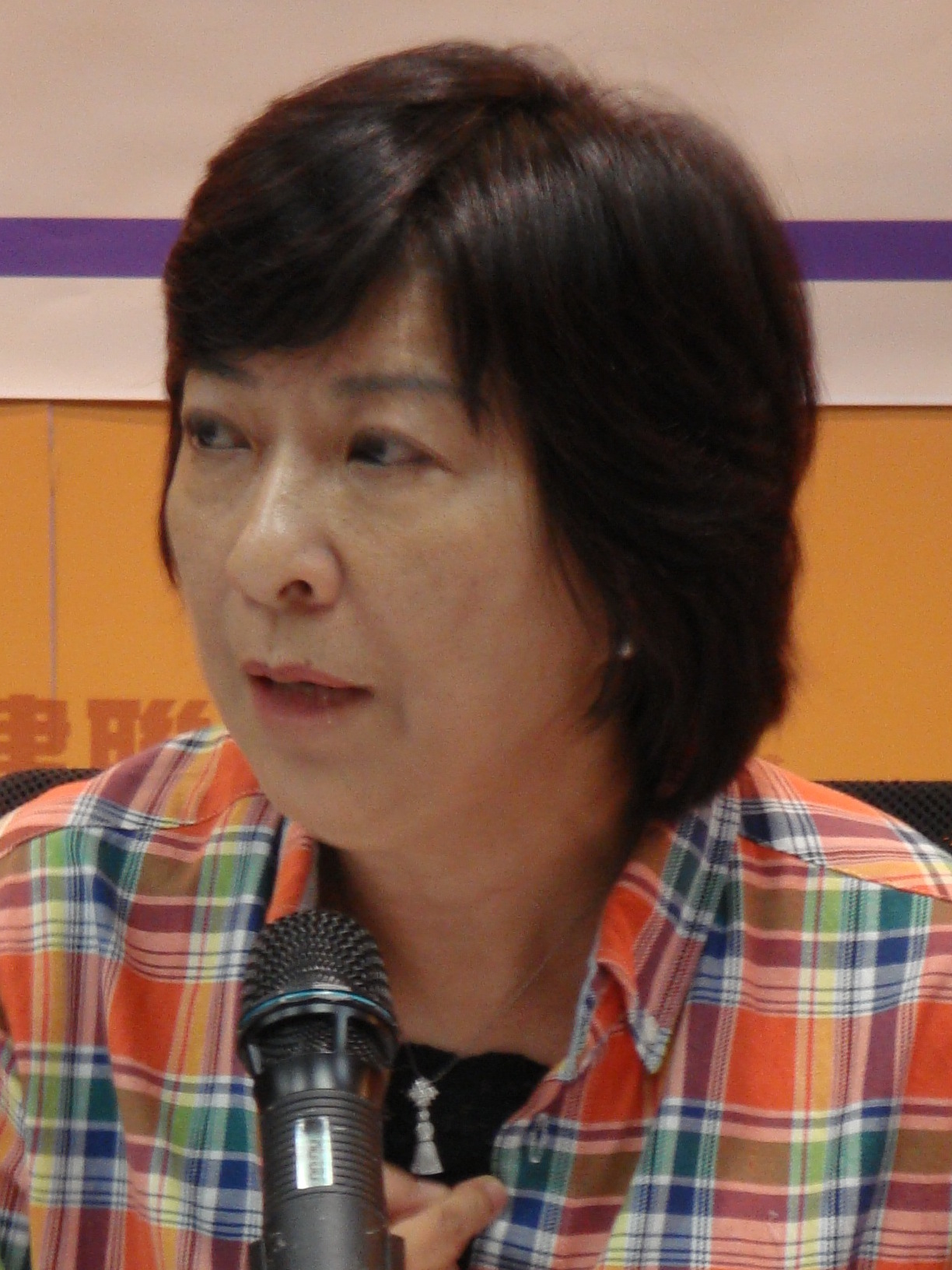
Candidate	Tang Siu-tong	Ann Chiang
Party	HKPA	Nonpartisan
Alliance	Pro-Beijing	Pro-Beijing
Electoral vote	28	22
Percentage	56%	44%
Member before election
Tang Siu-tong
HKPA
Elected Member
Tang Siu-tong
HKPA

The 1998 Regional Council by-election was held on 29 October 1998 after the court ruled the incumbent Legislative Councillor Tang Siu-tong was unduly elected in the Regional Council constituency due to invalid ballots. Tang eventually recaptured his seat with a larger margin in this by-election.

== Background ==
Preferential elimination system of voting was in place for the election of the Regional Council constituency. As stipulated in relevant regulation, electors must mark the first preference by entering "1" (Arabic numeral) against the name of a candidate on the ballot paper and indicate the other preferences in the descending order beginning with "2".

A general election of the Legislative Council was held in May 1998. In the Regional Council constituency, Tang Siu-tong defeated Ann Chiang in the second round with a 25–24 margin. Chiang then claimed irregularity in the election and challenged the validity of 5 ballot papers of the election, asserting those should not have been counted and the result would have been in her favour.

Amongst the five votes concerned, one was marked with numeral "1" and a tick "√" against Tang, one was marked with numeral "1" and "2" but had a counterfoil attached. Two ballots was marked only with a tick against Tang, including one with counterfoil. The remaining one was also marked only with a tick against Tang.

On 4 September 1998, the court ruled the votes with a single tick shall not be counted, and therefore Tang and Chiang should have tied with 23 votes each. Tang was declared unduly elected.

== Result ==
The three candidates ran in the general election were once again nominated during the nomination period from 17 to 30 September.

All 50 Regional Councillors voted in the re-run of the poll. Ngan Kam-chuen was eliminated again in the first round, and Tang won the seat with a widened margin.

1998 Regional Council by-election (second round result only)
Party	Candidate	Votes	%	±%
HKPA	Tang Siu-tong	28	56%	+4.98
Nonpartisan	Ann Chiang	22	44%	–4.98
DAB	Ngan Kam-chuen	–	–%	–
Total valid votes		50	100%	+0.02
Turnout		50	100%	+0.02
Registered electors		100		
HKPA hold		Swing	+4.98	

== Aftermath ==
Tang took the oath on 4 November at the first meeting after the election. He was the final member of the constituency as the Regional Council was then abolished. Tang was elected in the New Territories West in 2000 election, and retired after his term ended.

Chiang later joined the pro-Beijing flagship DAB, and was first elected to the Council in 2012.

== See also ==
- List of Hong Kong by-elections
