= 1992 New Territories West by-election =

Legislative Council of Hong Kong election

- 30 August 1992

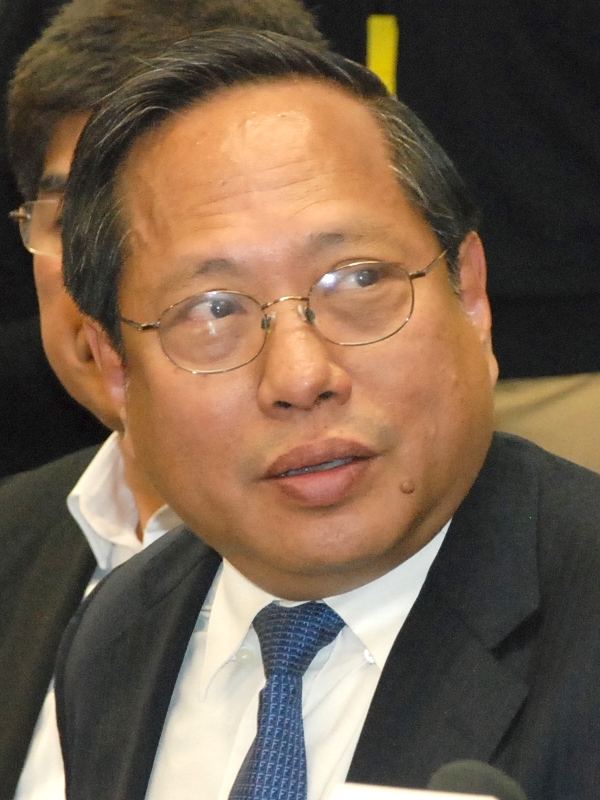
Candidate	Tang Siu-tong	Albert Ho
Party	Independent	United Democrats
Alliance	Pro-Beijing	Pro-democracy
Popular vote	33,038	30,466
Percentage	51.3%	47.3%
Member before election
Ng Ming-yum (death)
Meeting Point
Elected Member
Tang Siu-tong
Independent

The 1992 New Territories West by-election was held on 30 August 1992 after the incumbent Legislative Councillor Ng Ming-yum of New Territories West died of blood cancer on 22 June 1992.

It was the second by-election in the constituency since the 1991 general election. The two-time candidate, conservative rural leader Tang Siu-tong defeated Albert Ho Chun-yan, vice chairman of the liberal United Democrats of Hong Kong (UDHK), and independent Sui See-chun with 51 percent majority, receiving 33,038 votes.

== Result ==
New Territories West by-election 1992
Party	Candidate	Votes	%	±%
Independent	Tang Siu-tong	33,038	51.3	+16.7
United Democrats	Ho Chun-yan	30,466	47.3	
Independent	Sui See-chun	743	1.2	
Majority		2,572	4.0	
Total valid votes		64,247	100.0	
Independent gain from United Democrats		Swing		

== See also ==
- 1991 Hong Kong legislative election
- List of Hong Kong by-elections
- 1991 New Territories West by-election
