= 1991 New Territories West by-election =

Legislative Council of Hong Kong election

- 8 December 1991
- Turnout: 27.4%
Candidate	Zachary Wong	Tang Siu-tong
Party	Meeting Point	Independent
Alliance	Pro-democracy	Pro-Beijing
Popular vote	21,559	18,858
Percentage	39.5%	34.6%
Candidate	Yim Tin-sang	Kingsley Sit
Party	ADPL	Independent
Alliance	Pro-democracy	Pro-Beijing
Popular vote	7,780	5,745
Percentage	14.3%	10.5%
Member before election
Tai Chin-wah (resigned)
FSHK
Elected Member
Zachary Wong
Meeting Point

The 1991 New Territories West by-election was held on 8 December 1991 after the incumbent Legislative Councillor Tai Chin-wah of New Territories West resigned from the Legislative Council of Hong Kong (LegCo) on 8 October 1991 weeks after the 1991 general election as he was being discovered of his falsified legal qualifications.

The liberal Meeting Point (MP) Zachary Wong Wai-yin, who was fully supported by the United Democrats of Hong Kong (UDHK) triumphed over two conservative candidates with rural background, Tang Siu-tong and Kingsley Sit Ho-yin, and a liberal Association for Democracy and People's Livelihood (ADPL) candidate Yim Tin-sang, by receiving 21,559 votes with a 40 percent plurality.

The result raised the pro-democracy camp's total directly elected seats to 17, enlarging their strength in the legislature to 21, similar to that of the conservative Co-operative Resources Centre bloc.

Tai was later found guilty of forging credentials and was given a six-month jail sentence, suspended for one year.

== Candidates ==
The pro-democratic Meeting Point (MP) nominated Zachary Wong Wai-yin, the candidate in the September general election in 1991 who lost to Tai Chin-wah. As the electoral ally in the general election, the United Democrats of Hong Kong (UDHK) endorsed Wong.

Another pro-democratic party, the Association for Democracy and People's Livelihood (ADPL) also field a candidate, Yim Tin-sang, a Tuen Mun District Board member. The two pro-democratic parties fielding candidates against each other also sparked some controversies within the camp.

Tang Siu-tong and Kingsley Sit Ho-yin, both came from rural background also ran in the election.

== Result ==
New Territories West by-election 1991
Party	Candidate	Votes	%	±%
Meeting Point	Zachary Wong Wai-yin	21,559	39.5	+20.5
Independent	Tang Siu-tong	18,858	34.6	+18.3
ADPL	Yim Tin-sang	7,780	14.3	
Independent	Kingsley Sit Ho-yin	5,745	10.5	
Majority		2,701	4.9	
Total valid votes		53,942	100.0	
Rejected ballots		592		
Turnout		54,534	27.4	
Registered electors		198,812		
Meeting Point gain from FSHK		Swing		

== See also ==
- 1991 Hong Kong legislative election
- List of Hong Kong by-elections
- 1992 New Territories West by-election
