= Nam Fung (constituency) =

Constituency in the Eastern District, Hong Kong

- Elected constituency for the Eastern District Council
- Boundary of Nam Fung in Eastern District
- District: Eastern
- Legislative Council constituency: Hong Kong Island East
- Population: 13,692 (2019)
- Electorate: 8,833 (2019)

Current constituency
- Created: 1994
- Number of members: One
- Member: Vacant
- Created from: Kornhill; Quarry Bay South

Nam Fung (Chinese: 南豐) is one of the 35 constituencies in the Eastern District, Hong Kong.

The constituency returns one district councillor to the Eastern District Council, with an election every four years. It was created in the 1994 election and current held by Cheung Kwok-cheong, member of the Democratic Party.

Nam Fung constituency is loosely based on Nam Fung Sun Chuen and Mount Parker Lodge in Sai Wan Ho with estimated population of 13,692.

== Councillors represented ==
| Election | Member | Party | % |
|---|---|---|---|
| 1994 | Shea Hing-wan | Independent | 50.84 |
| 1999 | Leung Suk-ching | Democratic | 44.57 |
| 2003 | Leung Suk-ching | Democratic | 69.60 |
| 2007 | Leung Suk-ching | Democratic | 57.08 |
| 2011 | Leung Suk-ching | Democratic | 52.15 |
| 2014 by-election | Cheung Kwok-cheong→Vacant (Note: Resigned on 15 July 2021.) | Democratic | 61.47 |
| 2015 | Cheung Kwok-cheong→Vacant | Democratic | 73.20 |
| 2019 | Cheung Kwok-cheong→Vacant | Democratic | 65.48 |

== Election results ==
=== 2010s ===
Eastern District Council Election, 2019: Nam Fung
| Party | Candidate | Votes | % | ±% |
|---|---|---|---|---|
| Democratic | Cheung Kwok-cheong | 4,315 | 65.48 | −7.72 |
| BPA | Ricky Wong Sze-chin | 2,275 | 34.52 | |
| Majority | | 2,040 | 30.96 | |
| Turnout | | 6,617 | 74.92 | |
| Democratic hold | | Swing | | |

Eastern District Council Election, 2015: Nam Fung
| Party | Candidate | Votes | % | ±% |
|---|---|---|---|---|
| Democratic | Cheung Kwok-cheong | 3,343 | 73.2 | +11.7 |
| Nonpartisan | Yang Mo | 1,182 | 25.9 | |
| Nonpartisan | Li Chak-sum | 42 | 0.8 | |
| Majority | | 2,161 | 47.3 | +24.3 |
| Turnout | | 4.612 | 55.5 | +6.0 |
| Democratic hold | | Swing | | |

Nam Fung by-election, 2014
| Party | Candidate | Votes | % | ±% |
|---|---|---|---|---|
| Democratic | Cheung Kwok-cheong | 2,383 | 61.5 | +9.3 |
| DAB | Lee Ching-har | 1,494 | 38.5 | |
| Majority | | 889 | 23.0 | |
| Turnout | | 3,915 | 49.5 | |
| Democratic hold | | Swing | | |

Eastern District Council Election, 2011: Nam Fung
| Party | Candidate | Votes | % | ±% |
|---|---|---|---|---|
| Democratic | Leung Suk-ching | 1,841 | 52.2 | −4.9 |
| Independent | Ng Lai-ching | 1,515 | 42.9 | |
| LSD | Fok Wing-yi | 174 | 4.9 | |
| Democratic hold | | Swing | | |

=== 2000s ===
Eastern District Council Election, 2007: Nam Fung
| Party | Candidate | Votes | % | ±% |
|---|---|---|---|---|
| Democratic | Leung Suk-ching | 1,874 | 57.1 | −12.5 |
| DAB | Peter Wong Kit-hin | 1,409 | 42.9 | +12.5 |
| Democratic hold | | Swing | | |

Eastern District Council Election, 2003: Nam Fung
| Party | Candidate | Votes | % | ±% |
|---|---|---|---|---|
| Democratic | Leung Suk-ching | 2,672 | 69.6 | +25.2 |
| DAB | Hung Lin-cham | 1,167 | 30.4 | −3.6 |
| Democratic hold | | Swing | | |

=== 1990s ===
Eastern District Council Election, 1999: Nam Fung
| Party | Candidate | Votes | % | ±% |
|---|---|---|---|---|
| Democratic | Leung Suk-ching | 1,404 | 44.4 | |
| DAB | Sze Tin-chee | 1,075 | 34.0 | |
| Independent | Kwan Lok-ping | 671 | 21.2 | |
| Democratic gain from Independent | | Swing | | |

Eastern District Board Election, 1994: Nam Fung
| Party | Candidate | Votes | % | ±% |
|---|---|---|---|---|
| Independent | Shea Hing-wan | 971 | 50.3 | |
| Independent | Law Wing-kwan | 939 | 48.7 | |
| Independent win (new seat) | | | | |
