= East Tsim Sha Tsui & King's Park (constituency) =

- Elected constituency for the Yau Tsim Mong District Council
- Boundary of East Tsim Sha Tsui & King's Park in Yau Tsim Mong District
- District: Yau Tsim Mong
- Legislative Council constituency: Kowloon West
- Population: 12,641 (2019)
- Electorate: 4,642 (2019)

Current constituency
- Created: 1994
- Number of members: One
- Member: Leo Chu Tsz-lok (Democratic)

East Tsim Sha Tsui & King's Park (尖東及京士柏), formerly King's Park from 1994 to 2015, is one of the 20 constituencies in the Yau Tsim Mong District in Hong Kong.

The constituency elects one district councillor to the Yau Tsim Mong District Council, with an election every four years.

East Tsim Sha Tsui & King's Park constituency is loosely based on the King's Park area and East Tsim Sha Tsui in Kowloon with estimated population of 15,185.

== Councillors represented ==
Election	Member	Party
1994	Yim Kwok-on	Independent
1999	Edward Leung Wai-kuen	Independent
2013 by-election	Lam Kin-man	ADPL
2015	Michelle Tang Ming-sum	Nonpartisan
2019	Leo Chu Tsz-lok	Democratic

== Election results ==
=== 2010s ===
Yau Tsim Mong District Council Election, 2019: East Tsim Sha Tsui & King's Park
Party	Candidate	Votes	%	±%
Democratic	Leo Chu Tsz-lok	1,745	52.69	
Nonpartisan	Michelle Tang Ming-sum	1,567	47.31	−8.29
Majority		178	5.38	
Turnout		3,318	71.48	+26.28
Democratic gain from Nonpartisan		Swing		

Yau Tsim Mong District Council Election, 2015: East Tsim Sha Tsui & King's Park
Party	Candidate	Votes	%	±%
Nonpartisan	Michelle Tang Ming-sum	852	55.6	
Prof Commons	Henry Chan Man-yu	681	44.4	
Majority		171	11.2	
Turnout		1,551	45.3	
Nonpartisan gain from ADPL		Swing		

King's Park by-election 2013
Party	Candidate	Votes	%	±%
ADPL	Lam Kin-man	1,515	58.43	+17.4
Independent	Tang Ho-bun	780	30.08	
Liberal	Fu Chuen-fu	268	10.34	
Orchid Gardening	Chan Man	30	1.16	
ADPL gain from Independent		Swing		

Yau Tsim Mong District Council Election, 2011: King's Park
Party	Candidate	Votes	%	±%
Independent	Edward Leung Wing-kuen	1,045	41.0	−9.3
ADPL	Lam Kin-man	1,043	40.9	
Independent	Wong Shu-kau	178	7.0	
Independent	Lee Kwok-keung	165	6.5	
Independent	Wong Biu	118	4.6	
Independent hold		Swing		

=== 2000s ===
Yau Tsim Mong District Council Election, 2007: King's Park
Party	Candidate	Votes	%	±%
Independent	Edward Leung Wing-kuen	974	50.3	−5.6
Independent	Wong Shu-kau	787	40.6	
Independent	Richard-keller Tse	177	9.1	
Independent hold		Swing		

Yau Tsim Mong District Council Election, 2003: King's Park
Party	Candidate	Votes	%	±%
Independent	Edward Leung Wing-kuen	859	55.9	+1.2
Independent	Shum Chu-wah	782	44.1	
Independent hold		Swing		

=== 1990s ===
Yau Tsim Mong District Council Election, 1999: King's Park
Party	Candidate	Votes	%	±%
Independent	Edward Leung Wing-kuen	859	54.7	
Independent	Leung Tak-yiu	319	20.3	
Liberal	Chung Kin-ming	272	17.3	
Independent	Sheh Hing-wan	100	6.4	
Independent gain from Independent		Swing		

Yau Tsim Mong District Board Election, 1994: King's Park
Party	Candidate	Votes	%	±%
Independent	Yim Kwok-on	651	37.9	
Public Affairs Society	Kwan Lim-ho	474	27.6	
123DA	Yan Man-ching	374	21.8	
Independent	Lau Nung-sum	201	11.7	
Independent win (new seat)				
