= Tsz Wan West (constituency) =

- 慈雲西
- Elected constituency for the Wong Tai Sin District Council
- Boundary of Tsz Wan West in Wong Tai Sin District
- District: Wong Tai Sin
- Legislative Council constituency: Kowloon Central
- Population: 20,405 (2019)
- Electorate: 12,341 (2019)

Current constituency
- Created: 1999
- Number of members: One
- Member: (Vacant)

Tsz Wan West
- Traditional Chinese: 慈雲西
Transcriptions
Yue: Cantonese
- Yale Romanization: Chìh wàhn sāi
- Jyutping: Ci4 wan4 sai1

Tsz Wan West is one of the 25 constituencies in the Wong Tai Sin District in Hong Kong.

The constituency returns one district councillor to the Wong Tai Sin District Council, with an election every four years. The seat has been currently held by Yuen Kwok-keung of the Democratic Alliance for the Betterment and Progress of Hong Kong since 2011.

Tsz Wan West constituency is loosely based on the Tsz Lok Estate in Tsz Wan Shan with an estimated population of 20,405.

== Councillors represented ==
Election	Member	Party
1999	Celia Tam Yuet-ping	Democratic
2011	Yuen Kwok-keung	DAB
2019	Cheung Mau-ching→vacant	Democratic

== Election results ==
=== 2010s ===
Wong Tai Sin District Council Election, 2019: Tsz Wan West
Party	Candidate	Votes	%	±%
Democratic	Cheung Mau-ching	5,010	57.91	+18.17
DAB	Yuen Kwok-keung	3,642	42.09	−12.19
Majority		1,368	15.82	
Turnout		8,682	70.40	
Democratic gain from DAB		Swing		

Wong Tai Sin District Council Election, 2015: Tsz Wan West
Party	Candidate	Votes	%	±%
DAB	Yuen Kwok-keung	3,285	54.28	+3.14
Democratic	Yung Sing-kwong	2,405	39.74	−9.34
Civic Passion	Leung Yau-king	362	5.98	
Majority		880	54.28	
Turnout		6,052	52.95	
DAB hold		Swing	+6.24	

Wong Tai Sin District Council Election, 2011: Tsz Wan West
Party	Candidate	Votes	%	±%
DAB	Yuen Kwok-keung	2,596	50.92	+4.08
Democratic	Lui Wing-kei	2,502	49.08	−4.08
Turnout		5,098	43.51	
DAB gain from Democratic		Swing	+4.08	

=== 2000s ===
Wong Tai Sin District Council Election, 2007: Tsz Wan West
Party	Candidate	Votes	%	±%
Democratic	Celia Tam Yuet-ping	2,646	55.00	−8.89
DAB	Yuen Kwok-keung	2,165	45.00	−27.84
Democratic hold		Swing		

Wong Tai Sin District Council Election, 2003: Tsz Wan West
Party	Candidate	Votes	%	±%
Democratic	Celia Tam Yuet-ping	3,034	63.89	+18.23
DAB	Lo Yee-hang	1,290	27.16	
Nonpartisan	Fan Wai-keung	425	8.95	−7.47
Independent hold		Swing		

=== 1990s ===
Wong Tai Sin District Council Election, 1999: Tsz Wan West
Party	Candidate	Votes	%	±%
Democratic	Celia Tam Yuet-ping	1,282	45.66	
Nonpartisan	Cecilia Yeung Lai-yin	1,065	37.93	
Nonpartisan	Fan Wai-keung	461	16.42	
Democratic win (new seat)				
