= Tsui Wan (constituency) =

Hong Kong electoral district

- Elected constituency for the Eastern District Council
- Boundary of Tsui Wan in Eastern District
- District: Eastern
- Legislative Council constituency: Hong Kong Island East
- Population: 12,477 (2019)
- Electorate: 9,003 (2019)

Current constituency
- Created: 1994
- Number of members: One
- Member: Vacant
- Created from: Chai Wan North; Heng Fa Chuen

Tsui Wan is one of the 37 constituencies in the Eastern District, Hong Kong. The constituency returns one district councillor to the Eastern District Council, with an election every four years.

Tsui Wan constituency is loosely based on the Tsui Wan Estate and in Chai Wan with estimated population of 12,477.

== Councillors represented ==
Election	Member	Party	%
1994	Tang Lai-ming	DAB	65.02
1999	Tang Lai-ming	DAB	60.70
2003	Tang Lai-ming	DAB	52.04
2006 by-election	Ku Kwai-yiu	Independent→LSD	52.04
2007	Ku Kwai-yiu	LSD	53.15
2011	Kwan Shui-lung	DAB	54.18
2015	Ku Kwai-yiu→Vacant (Note: Resigned on 15 July 2021.)	Independent	36.60
2019	Ku Kwai-yiu→Vacant	Independent	55.63

== Election results ==
=== 2010s ===
Eastern District Council Election, 2019: Tsui Wan
Party	Candidate	Votes	%	±%
Independent	Ku Kwai-yiu	3,569	55.63	+19.03
DAB (FTU)	Lau Suk-yin	2,847	44.37	+9.05
Majority		722	11.26	
Turnout		6,434	71.50	
Independent hold		Swing		

Eastern District Council Election, 2015: Tsui Wan
Party	Candidate	Votes	%	±%
Independent	Ku Kwai-yiu	1,629	36.60	−8.59
DAB	Kwan Shui-lung	1,572	35.32	−18.86
Nonpartisan	Lai Leung Siu-kwan	1,181	26.53	
Nonpartisan	Jeff Wan Tsz-fung	69	1.55	
Majority		57	1.28	
Turnout		4,451	51.88	
Independent gain from DAB		Swing		

Eastern District Council Election, 2011: Tsui Wan
Party	Candidate	Votes	%	±%
DAB	Kwan Shui-lung	2,336	54.18	+7.33
LSD	Ku Kwai-yiu	1,926	45.19	−7.33
Majority		410	8.99	
Turnout		4,262	49.27	
DAB gain from LSD		Swing		

=== 2000s ===
Eastern District Council Election, 2007: Tsui Wan
Party	Candidate	Votes	%	±%
LSD	Ku Kwai-yiu	2,092	53.15	+1.09
DAB	Keung Suk-man	1,844	46.85	−1.09
Majority		248	6.30	
LSD hold		Swing		

Tsui Wan by-election 2006
Party	Candidate	Votes	%	±%
Nonpartisan	Ku Kwai-yiu	1,733	52.04	−1.47
DAB	Keung Suk-man	1,694	47.96	+1.47
Majority		39	4.08	
Nonpartisan gain from DAB		Swing	−1.47	

Eastern District Council Election, 2003: Tsui Wan
Party	Candidate	Votes	%	±%
DAB	Tang Lai-ming	1,827	52.04	−8.66
Nonpartisan	Ku Kwai-yiu	1,684	47.96	+8.66
Majority		143	4.08	
DAB hold		Swing	−8.66	

=== 1990s ===
Eastern District Council Election, 1999: Tsui Wan
Party	Candidate	Votes	%	±%
DAB	Tang Lai-ming	2,054	60.70	−4.32
Democratic	Ku Kwai-yiu	1,330	39.30	+4.32
Majority		724	11.40	
DAB hold		Swing	−4.32	

Eastern District Board Election, 1994: Tsui Wan
Party	Candidate	Votes	%	±%
DAB	Tang Lai-ming	1,706	65.02	
Democratic	Wong Sing-fai	918	34.98	
Majority		724	7.88	
DAB win (new seat)				
