= King Tin (constituency) =

Hong Kong constituency

- Elected constituency for the Kwun Tong District Council
- Boundary of King Tin in Kwun Tong District
- District: Kwun Tong
- Legislative Council constituency: Kowloon East
- Population: 20,225 (2019)
- Electorate: 12,034 (2019)

Current constituency
- Created: 1994
- Number of members: One
- Member: Wong Ka-ying (Independent)

King Tin (Chinese: 景田) is one of the 37 constituencies in the Kwun Tong District of Hong Kong which was created in 1994 and currently held by Civic Party member Wong Ka-ying.

The constituency loosely covers Lei On Court, Hong Tin Court and Sceneway Garden in Lam Tin with the estimated population of 20,225.

== Councillors represented ==
Election	Member	Party
1994	Ng Siu-wah	DAB
1999	Ng Chung-tak	Nonpartisan
2003	Ng Chung-tak	Nonpartisan→Liberal
2006 by-election	Cheung Shun-wah	Nonpartisan
2007	Cheung Shun-wah	
2011	Cheung Shun-wah	
2015	Cheung Shun-wah	
2019	Sarah Wong Ka-ying	Civic→Independent

== Election results ==
=== 2010s ===
Kwun Tong District Council Election, 2019: King Tin
Party	Candidate	Votes	%	±%
Civic	Sarah Wong Ka-ying	5,638	61.58	+17.84
Nonpartisan	Danny Lui Sik-kwan	3,518	38.42	
Majority		2,120	3.16	
Turnout		9,205	76.50	
Civic gain from Nonpartisan		Swing		

Kwun Tong District Council Election, 2015: King Tin
Party	Candidate	Votes	%	±%
Nonpartisan	Cheung Shun-wah	2,791	56.26	−13.02
Civic	Tong Dick-kan	2,170	43.74	
Majority		621	12.52	
Turnout		4,961	46.31	
Nonpartisan hold		Swing		

Kwun Tong District Council Election, 2011: King Tin
Party	Candidate	Votes	%	±%
Nonpartisan	Cheung Shun-wah	2,923	69.28	
LSD	Remzi Wu Hing-yin	1,296	30.72	
Majority		1,627	38.56	
Turnout		4,219	41.11	
Nonpartisan hold		Swing		

=== 2000s ===
Kwun Tong District Council Election, 2007: King Tin
Party	Candidate	Votes	%	±%
Nonpartisan	Cheung Shun-wah	Unopposed		
Nonpartisan hold		Swing		

King Tin by-election 2006
Party	Candidate	Votes	%	±%
Nonpartisan	Cheung Shun-wah	1,491	52.65	
Democratic	Li Wah-ming	1,249	44.10	
Nonpartisan	Chan Man Luen-ying	92	3.25	
Majority		242	8.55	
Nonpartisan gain from Liberal		Swing		

Kwun Tong District Council Election, 2003: King Tin
Party	Candidate	Votes	%	±%
Nonpartisan	Ng Chung-tak	Unopposed		
Nonpartisan hold		Swing		

=== 1990s ===
Kwun Tong District Council Election, 1999: King Tin
Party	Candidate	Votes	%	±%
Nonpartisan	Ng Chung-tak	994	53.88	
DAB	Ng Siu-wah	851	46.12	+1.63
Majority		143	7.25	
Nonpartisan gain from DAB		Swing		

Kwun Tong District Board Election, 1994: King Tin
Party	Candidate	Votes	%	±%
DAB	Ng Siu-wah	885	44.49	
Nonpartisan	Au Yeung Moon-wah	804	40.42	
Nonpartisan	Lau Ting-kwong	300	15.08	
Majority		81	4.07	
DAB win (new seat)				
