= Siu Hei (constituency) =

Hong Kong constituency

- Elected constituency for the Tuen Mun District Council
- Boundary of Siu Hei in Tuen Mun District
- District: Tuen Mun
- Legislative Council constituency: New Territories North West
- Population: 12,544 (2019)
- Electorate: 7,671 (2019)

Current constituency
- Created: 1994
- Number of members: One
- Member: Yan Siu-nam (ADPL)

Siu Hei is one of the 37 constituencies in the Tuen Mun District. The constituency returns one district councillor to the Tuen Mun District Council, with an election every four years.

Siu Hei constituency is loosely based on the area of Siu Hei Court, Miami Beach Towers and Marina Garden in Tuen Mun with estimated population of 12,544.

== Councillors represented ==
Election	Member	Party
1994	Ng Wai-cho	123DA
1996 by-election	Yim Tin-sang	ADPL
2015	Yan Siu-nam	ADPL

== Election results ==
=== 2010s ===
Tuen Mun District Council Election, 2019: Siu Hei
Party	Candidate	Votes	%	±%
ADPL	Yan Siu-nam	3,934	68.51	+10.92
DAB	Tsoi Shing-hin	1,808	31.49	−10.92
Majority		2,126	37.02	
ADPL hold		Swing		

Tuen Mun District Council Election, 2015: Siu Hei
Party	Candidate	Votes	%	±%
ADPL	Yan Siu-nam	2,021	57.59	−0.21
DAB	Hau Tung-kin	1,488	42.41	+0.21
Majority		533	15.18	
ADPL hold		Swing	+0.21	

Tuen Mun District Council Election, 2011: Siu Hei
Party	Candidate	Votes	%	±%
ADPL	Yim Tin-sang	1,608	57.80	−12.44
DAB	Hau Tung-kin	1,174	42.20	+12.44
Majority		434	15.22	
Turnout		2,782	41.04	
ADPL hold		Swing	−12.44	

=== 2000s ===
Tuen Mun District Council Election, 2007: Siu Hei
Party	Candidate	Votes	%	±%
ADPL	Yim Tin-sang	1,558	70.24	−9.26
DAB	Choi Hok-foo	660	29.76	
Majority		898	40.48	
ADPL hold		Swing		

Tuen Mun District Council Election, 2003: Siu Hei
Party	Candidate	Votes	%	±%
ADPL	Yim Tin-sang	2,014	80.50	+2.73
Nonpartisan	Man Hing-chi	334	13.35	
Nonpartisan	Chung Kwok-kei	154	6.16	
Majority		1,680	67.15	
ADPL hold		Swing		

=== 1990s ===
Tuen Mun District Council Election, 1999: Siu Hei
Party	Candidate	Votes	%	±%
ADPL	Yim Tin-sang	1,518	77.77	−12.72
Nonpartisan	Chan Siu-ying	434	22.23	
Majority		1,084	55.54	
DAB hold		Swing		

Siu Hei by-election 1996
Party	Candidate	Votes	%	±%
ADPL	Yim Tin-sang	1,504	89.05	
Nonpartisan	Wong Yin-ping	185	10.95	
Majority		1,329	78.10	
ADPL gain from 123DA		Swing		

Tuen Mun District Board Election, 1994: Siu Hei
Party	Candidate	Votes	%	±%
123DA	Ng Wai-cho	1,601	77.12	
Liberal	Tam Chi-kin	475	22.88	
Majority		1,126	44.24	
123DA win (new seat)				
