= Kornhill (constituency) =

Hong Kong constituency

- Elected constituency for the Eastern District Council
- Boundary of Kornhill in Eastern District
- District: Eastern
- Legislative Council constituency: Hong Kong Island East
- Population: 14,528 (2019)
- Electorate: 8,933 (2019)

Current constituency
- Created: 1991
- Number of members: One
- Member: Vacant

Kornhill (Chinese: 康怡) is one of the 35 constituencies in the Eastern District.

The constituency returns one district councillor to the Eastern District Council, with an election every four years. The seat is currently held by Bonnie Leung Wing-man of the Civic Party.

Kornhill constituency is loosely based on Kornhill in Quarry Bay with estimated population of 14,528.

== Councillors represented ==
Election	Member	Party	%
1991	Philip Mak Shun-pong	Independent	64.86
1994	Philip Mak Shun-pong	Independent	53.61
1999	Philip Mak Shun-pong	Independent	89.20
2003	Philip Mak Shun-pong	Independent	63.75
2007	Chan Kai-yuen	Civic	57.95
2011	Chan Kai-yuen	Civic	52.14
2015	Bonnie Leung Wing-man	Civic	50.63
2019	Derek Ngai Chi-ho→Vacant (Note: Resigned on 9 July 2021.)	Civic	59.12

== Election results ==
=== 2010s ===
Eastern District Council Election, 2019: Kornhill
Party	Candidate	Votes	%	±%
Civic	Derek Ngai Chi-ho	4,127	59.12	+9.06
NPP	Nathan Chau Cheuk-yin	2,854	40.88	−7.92
Majority		1,273	18.24	
Turnout		7,009	78.47	
Civic hold		Swing		

Eastern District Council Election, 2015: Kornhill
Party	Candidate	Votes	%	±%
Civic	Bonnie Leung Wing-man	2,535	50.6	–1.5
NPP	Hung Lung-chuen	2,443	48.8	
Nonpartisan	Wong Po-yi	29	0.6	
Majority		92	1.8	–2.4
Turnout		5,044	61.3	
Civic hold		Swing		

Eastern District Council Election, 2011: Kornhill
Party	Candidate	Votes	%	±%
Civic	Chan Kai-yuen	2,050	52.1	–5.8
Nonpartisan	Wong King	1,882	47.9	
Majority		168	4.2	–11.6
Civic hold		Swing		

=== 2000s ===
Eastern District Council Election, 2007: Kornhill
Party	Candidate	Votes	%	±%
Civic	Chan Kai-yuen	1,998	57.9	
Nonpartisan	Philip Mak Shun-pong	1,450	42.1	–21.7
Majority		548	15.8	–11.8
Civic gain from Nonpartisan		Swing		

Eastern District Council Election, 2003: Kornhill
Party	Candidate	Votes	%	±%
Nonpartisan	Philip Mak Shun-pong	1,743	63.8	–24.6
Nonpartisan	Shea Hing-wan	991	36.2	
Majority		752	27.6	–50.1
Nonpartisan hold		Swing		

=== 1990s ===
Eastern District Council Election, 1999: Kornhill
Party	Candidate	Votes	%	±%
Nonpartisan	Philip Mak Shun-pong	1,940	88.4	+35.2
Nonpartisan	David Chiu Che-hon	235	10.7	
Majority		1,750	77.7	+70.6
Nonpartisan hold		Swing		

Eastern District Board Election, 1994: Kornhill
Party	Candidate	Votes	%	±%
Nonpartisan	Philip Mak Shun-pong	1,322	53.2	–11.5
Democratic	Leung Suk-ching	1,144	46.1	
Majority		178	7.1	–34.2
Nonpartisan hold		Swing		

Eastern District Board Election, 1991: Kornhill
Party	Candidate	Votes	%	±%
Nonpartisan	Philip Mak Shun-pong	1,862	64.7	
LDF	Lam Kwok-kwong	673	23.4	
HKDF	Yeung Po-sun	336	11.7	
Majority		1,189	41.3	
Nonpartisan win (new seat)				
