= Hoi Sham (constituency) =

- Elected constituency for the Kowloon City District Council
- Boundary of Hoi Sham in Kowloon City District
- District: Kowloon City
- Legislative Council constituency: Kowloon Central
- Population: 15,116 (2019)
- Electorate: 8,146 (2019)

Current constituency
- Created: 1994
- Number of members: One
- Member: Pun Kwok-wah (DAB)
- Created from: Kai Tak

Hoi Sham (Chinese: 海心) is one of the 24 constituencies in the Kowloon City District of Hong Kong which was created in 1994.

The constituency loosely covers coastal area of To Kwa Wan with the estimated population of 15,116.

== Councillors represented ==
Election	Member	Party
1991	Mak King-lun	LDF
1997	Mak King-lun	Progressive Alliance
2003 by-election	Pun Kwok-wah	DAB/PA
2003	Lam Kin-man	Democratic
200?	Lam Kin-man	ADPL
2007	Pun Kwok-wah	DAB

== Election results ==
=== 2010s ===
Kowloon City District Council Election, 2019: Hoi Sham
Party	Candidate	Votes	%	±%
DAB	Pun Kwok-wah	2,916	50.22	−28.90
Nonpartisan	Jack Tung Kai-man	2,890	49.78	
Majority		26	0.44	
Turnout		5,835	71.65	
DAB hold		Swing		

Kowloon City District Council Election, 2015: Hoi Sham
Party	Candidate	Votes	%	±%
DAB	Pun Kwok-wah	2,478	79.12	+0.92
HKAA	Lee Ka-wai	654	20.88	
Majority		1,824	58.24	
Turnout		3,132	40.34	
DAB hold		Swing		

Kowloon City District Council Election, 2011: Hoi Sham
Party	Candidate	Votes	%	±%
DAB	Pun Kwok-wah	2,613	78.14	+24.61
Nonpartisan	Tong Hoi-man	731	21.86	
Majority		1,882	56.28	
Turnout		3,344	43.63	
DAB hold		Swing		

=== 2000s ===
Kowloon City District Council Election, 2007: Hoi Sham
Party	Candidate	Votes	%	±%
FTU (DAB)	Pun Kwok-wah	1,989	53.53	+4.88
ADPL	Lam Kin-man	1,727	46.47	−4.88
Majority		262	7.26	
FTU hold		Swing	+4.88	

Kowloon City District Council Election, 2003: Hoi Sham
Party	Candidate	Votes	%	±%
Democratic	Lam Kin-man	1,765	51.35	−23.21
DAB (HKPA)	Pun Kwok-wah	1,672	48.65	+9.06
Majority		93	2.70	
Democratic gain from DAB		Swing		

Hoi Sham by-election 2003
Party	Candidate	Votes	%	±%
DAB (HKPA)	Pun Kwok-wah	1,012	39.59	−16.15
Democratic	Lam Kin-man	721	28.21	
ADPL	Pius Yam Kwok-tung	469	18.35	
Liberal	Stephen Leung Yun-yeung	241	9.43	−34.83
Nonpartisan	Guide Lam Hoi-sing	101	3.95	
HKPLP	Woo Yan-yue	12	0.47	
Majority		291	11.38	
HKPA hold		Swing		

=== 1990s ===
Kowloon City District Council Election, 1999: Hoi Sham
Party	Candidate	Votes	%	±%
HKPA	Mak King-lun	1,214	55.74	+4.76
Liberal	Stephen Leung Yun-yeung	964	44.26	
Majority		250	11.48	
HKPA hold		Swing		

Kowloon City District Board Election, 1994: Hoi Sham
Party	Candidate	Votes	%	±%
LDF	Mak King-lun	941	50.98	
Kowloon City Observers	Leung Yun-yeung	905	49.02	
Majority		36	1.96	
LDF hold		Swing		

Kowloon City District Board Election, 1991: Hoi Sham
Party	Candidate	Votes	%	±%
LDF	Mak King-lun	Uncontested		
LDF win (new seat)				
