= Kai Hiu (constituency) =

Hong Kong constituency

- Elected constituency for the Eastern District Council
- Boundary of Kai Hiu in Eastern District
- District: Eastern
- Legislative Council constituency: Hong Kong Island East
- Population: 13,356 (2019)
- Electorate: 9,184 (2019)

Current constituency
- Created: 2003
- Number of members: One
- Member: Vacant
- Created from: Chai Wan South

Kai Hiu (Chinese: 佳曉) is one of the 35 constituencies in the Eastern District, Hong Kong.

The constituency returns one district councillor to the Eastern District Council, with an election every four years.

Kai Hiu constituency is loosely based on the Hiu Tsui Court and Kai Tsui Court in Siu Sai Wan with estimated population of 13,356.

== Councillors represented ==
Election	Member	Party
2003	Lam Chui-lin	Liberal
2011	Lam Chui-lin	Independent
2018 by-election	Elaine Chik Kit-ling	DAB/FTU
2019	Lai Tsz-yan→Vacant (Note: Disqualified on 15 September 2021 after her oath was invalid.)	Independent

== Election results ==
=== 2010s ===
Eastern District Council Election, 2019: Kai Hiu
Party	Candidate	Votes	%	±%
Independent	Lai Tsz-yan	3,200	49.28	
DAB (FTU)	Elaine Chik Kit-ling	2,712	41.77	−11.26
Nonpartisan	Enki Tan Chun-chun	581	8.95	
Majority		488	7.51	
Turnout		6,523	71.05	
Independent gain from DAB		Swing		

Kai Hiu By-election, 2018
Party	Candidate	Votes	%	±%
DAB (FTU)	Elaine Chik Kit-ling	2,268	53.03	
Independent	Ishigami Alice Lee Fung-king	1,302	30.44	
Independent	Enki Tan Chun-chun	707	16.53	
Majority		966	22.59	
Turnout		4,307	49.35	
DAB gain from Independent		Swing		

Eastern District Council Election, 2015: Kai Hiu
Party	Candidate	Votes	%	±%
Independent	Alice Lam Chui-lin	2,241	59.68	+3.16
DAB	Elaine Chik Kit-ling	1,514	40.32	
Majority		727	19.36	
Turnout		3,755	43.51	
Independent hold		Swing		

Eastern District Council Election, 2011: Kai Hiu
Party	Candidate	Votes	%	±%
Independent	Alice Lam Chui-lin	1,925	56.52	
Independent	Ng Mei-yung	703	20.64	
Independent	Joseph Lau Kao-king	455	13.36	
Independent	Leung Chi-wai	323	9.48	
Turnout		3,406	37.64	
Independent hold		Swing		

=== 2000s ===
Eastern District Council Election, 2007: Kai Hiu
Party	Candidate	Votes	%	±%
Liberal	Lam Chui-lin	Uncontested		
Liberal hold		Swing		

Eastern District Council Election, 2003: Kai Hiu
Party	Candidate	Votes	%	±%
Liberal	Lam Chui-lin	2,400	75.14	
Justice Union	Wu Kin-nam	794	24.86	
Liberal win (new seat)				
