= Nam Cheong Central (constituency) =

Hong Kong constituency

- Elected constituency for the Sham Shui Po District Council
- Boundary of Nam Cheong Central in Sham Shui Po District
- District: Sham Shui Po
- Legislative Council constituency: Kowloon West
- Population: 20,029 (2019)
- Electorate: 5,013 (2019)

Current constituency
- Created: 1991
- Number of members: One
- Member: Lau Pui-yuk (DAB)

Nam Cheong Central (Chinese: 南昌中) is one of the 25 constituencies in the Sham Shui Po District of Hong Kong which was created in 1991.

The constituency loosely covers central part of Sham Shui Po with the estimated population of 20,029.

== Councillors represented ==
Election	Member	Party
1991	Leung Kam-to	ADPL
1994	Chow Kwok-leung	ADPL
1999	Raymond Cheung Man-to	ADPL
????	Raymond Cheung Man-to	DAB
2003	Tai Yuen-ming	ADPL
2005 by-election	Raymond Cheung Man-to	DAB
2007	Lau Pui-yuk	DAB

== Election results ==
=== 2010s ===
Sham Shui Po District Council Election, 2019: Nam Cheong Central
Party	Candidate	Votes	%	±%
DAB	Lau Pui-yuk	1,640	51.60	−18.87
Nonpartisan	Lam Sin-tung	1,538	48.40	
Majority		102	3.20	
Turnout		3,189	63.69	
DAB hold		Swing		

Sham Shui Po District Council Election, 2015: Nam Cheong Central
Party	Candidate	Votes	%	±%
DAB	Lau Pui-yuk	1,284	70.47	−4.77
Independent	Mak Wai-ming	538	29.53	+4.77
Majority		351	7.46	
DAB hold		Swing	−4.77	

Sham Shui Po District Council Election, 2011: Nam Cheong Central
Party	Candidate	Votes	%	±%
DAB	Lau Pui-yuk	1,569	75.14	+20.95
Independent	Mak Wai-ming	519	24.86	
Majority		1,015	50.28	
Turnout		2,088	32.04	
DAB hold		Swing		

=== 2000s ===
Sham Shui Po District Council Election, 2007: Nam Cheong Central
Party	Candidate	Votes	%	±%
FTU (DAB)	Lau Pui-yuk	1,197	54.19	+2.75
ADPL	Cheung Chi-keung	1,012	45.81	+13.10
Majority		185	8.38	
FTU hold		Swing		

Nam Cheong Central by-election 2005
Party	Candidate	Votes	%	±%
DAB	Raymond Cheung Man-to	964	51.44	+14.07
ADPL	Cheung Chi-keung	613	32.71	−27.90
Frontier	Foo Wai-lok	183	9.77	
Nonpartisan	Ngai Sing-leuk	114	6.08	
Majority		351	18.73	
DAB gain from ADPL		Swing		

=== 2000s ===
Sham Shui Po District Council Election, 2003: Nam Cheong Central
Party	Candidate	Votes	%	±%
ADPL	Tai Yuen-ming	1,262	60.61	+14.11
DAB	Raymond Cheung Man-to	778	37.37	+15.91
IHKRF	Hafeez Sheraz	42	2.02	
Majority		484	23.24	
ADPL gain from DAB		Swing		

=== 1990s ===
Sham Shui Po District Council Election, 1999: Nam Cheong Central
Party	Candidate	Votes	%	±%
ADPL	Raymond Cheung Man-to	637	46.50	−6.34
Democratic	Lai Siu-chung	439	32.04	
DAB	Ko Ka-kwong	294	21.46	
Majority		198	14.46	
ADPL hold		Swing		

Sham Shui Po District Board Election, 1994: Nam Cheong Central
Party	Candidate	Votes	%	±%
ADPL	Chow Kwok-leung	567	52.84	
123DA	Au Yeung Lun	506	47.16	
Majority		61	5.68	
ADPL hold		Swing		

Sham Shui Po District Board Election, 1991: Nam Cheong Central
Party	Candidate	Votes	%	±%
ADPL	Leung Kam-to	uncontested		
ADPL win (new seat)				
