= San Po Kong (constituency) =

Hong Kong constituency

- 新蒲崗
- Elected constituency for the Wong Tai Sin District Council
- Boundary of San Po Kong in Wong Tai Sin District
- District: Wong Tai Sin
- Legislative Council constituency: Kowloon Central
- Population: 20,018 (2019)
- Electorate: 10,856 (2019)

Current constituency
- Created: 1982
- Number of members: One
- Member: (Vacant)

San Po Kong
- Traditional Chinese: 新蒲崗
Transcriptions
Yue: Cantonese
- Yale Romanization: Sān pòuh gōng
- Jyutping: San1 pou4 gong1

San Po Kong is one of the 25 constituencies in the Wong Tai Sin District in Hong Kong. The constituency returns one district councillor to the Wong Tai Sin District Council, with an election every four years.

The constituency has an estimated population of 20,018.

== Councillors represented ==
Election	Member	Party
1982	Chan Ping	Independent
198?	Chan Ping	Civic Association
1988	Chan Yuet-sut	Civic Association
199?	Chan Yuet-sut	EKDRC
1999	Lee Tat-yan	EKDRC
2015	Wendy Lui Kai-lin	Independent
2019	Chan Kai-shun→Vacant	Independent

== Election results ==
=== 2010s ===
Wong Tai Sin District Council Election, 2019: San Po Kong
Party	Candidate	Votes	%	±%
Independent	Chan Kai-shun	4,372	55.77	
Nonpartisan	Wendy Lui Kai-lin	3,468	44.23	
Majority		904	11.54	
Turnout		7,861	72.42	
Independent gain from Nonpartisan		Swing		
