= Kwai Shing East Estate (constituency) =

Hong Kong constituency

- Elected constituency for the Kwai Tsing District Council
- Boundary of Kwai Shing East Estate in Kwai Tsing District
- District: Kwai Tsing
- Legislative Council constituency: New Territories South West
- Population: 20,194 (2019)
- Electorate: 7,699 (2019)

Current constituency
- Created: 1994
- Number of members: One
- Member: vacant

Kwai Shing East Estate is one of the 31 constituencies of the Kwai Tsing District Council. The seat elects one member of the council every four years. It was first created in the 1994 elections. Its boundary is loosely based on Kwai Shing East Estate in Kwai Chung.

== Councillors represented ==
| Election | Member | Party |
|---|---|---|
| 1994 | Leung Kwong-cheong | ADPL |
| 1996 | Leung Kwong-cheong | Independent |
| 2009 by-election | Lai Fan-fong | Nonpartisan |
| 200? | Lai Fan-fong | DAB |
| 2011 | Rayman Chow Wai-hung→vacant | NWSC |
| 2018 | Rayman Chow Wai-hung→vacant | Independent |

== Election results ==
=== 2010s ===
Kwai Tsing District Council Election, 2019: Kwai Shing East Estate
| Party | Candidate | Votes | % | ±% |
|---|---|---|---|---|
| PfD | Rayman Chow Wai-hung | 4,980 | 62.63 | +7.22 |
| DAB | Ng Chi-wah | 2,912 | 36.62 | +5.00 |
| Nonpartisan | Cherrie Lai Chung-yan | 59 | 0.74 | |
| Majority | | 2,068 | 26.01 | |
| Turnout | | 7,969 | 68.76 | |
| PfD hold | | Swing | | |

Kwai Tsing District Council Election, 2015: Kwai Shing East Estate
| Party | Candidate | Votes | % | ±% |
|---|---|---|---|---|
| NWSC | Rayman Chow Wai-hung | 3,212 | 55.41 | −9.27 |
| DAB | Mo Sang-tung | 1,833 | 31.62 | −3.70 |
| Nonpartisan | Leung Kwong-cheong | 677 | 11.68 | |
| Nonpartisan | Chan Yuk-ling | 75 | 1.29 | |
| Majority | | 1,379 | 23.79 | |
| Turnout | | 5,797 | 53.73 | |
| NWSC hold | | Swing | | |

Kwai Tsing District Council Election, 2011: Kwai Shing East Estate
| Party | Candidate | Votes | % | ±% |
|---|---|---|---|---|
| NWSC | Rayman Chow Wai-hung | 3,469 | 64.68 | +29.96 |
| DAB | Lai Fan-fong | 1,894 | 35.32 | −2.15 |
| Majority | | 1,575 | 29.36 | |
| Turnout | | 5,363 | 48.55 | |
| NWSC gain from DAB | | Swing | +16.06 | |

=== 2000s ===
Kwai Shing East Estate by-election 2009
| Party | Candidate | Votes | % | ±% |
|---|---|---|---|---|
| Nonpartisan | Lai Fan-fong | 1,451 | 37.15 | |
| NWSC | Rayman Chow Wai-hung | 1,356 | 34.72 | +1.11 |
| Nonpartisan | Li Chi-fai | 1,099 | 28.13 | |
| Majority | | 95 | 2.43 | |
| Nonpartisan gain from Independent | | Swing | | |

Kwai Tsing District Council Election, 2007: Kwai Shing East Estate
| Party | Candidate | Votes | % | ±% |
|---|---|---|---|---|
| Independent | Leung Kwong-cheong | 2,355 | 66.39 | −0.72 |
| Nonpartisan | Rayman Chow Wai-hung | 1,192 | 33.61 | |
| Majority | | 1,163 | 32.78 | |
| Independent hold | | Swing | | |

Kwai Tsing District Council Election, 2003: Kwai Shing East Estate
| Party | Candidate | Votes | % | ±% |
|---|---|---|---|---|
| Independent | Leung Kwong-cheong | 2,752 | 67.11 | −14.88 |
| DAB | Lai Fan-fong | 1,349 | 19.01 | |
| Majority | | 1,403 | 48.87 | |
| Independent hold | | Swing | | |

=== 1990s ===
Kwai Tsing District Council Election, 1999: Kwai Shing East Estate
| Party | Candidate | Votes | % | ±% |
|---|---|---|---|---|
| Independent | Leung Kwong-cheong | 2,012 | 81.99 | +22.01 |
| Nonpartisan | Leung Yuk-fung | 442 | 19.01 | |
| Majority | | 1,570 | 62.98 | |
| Independent hold | | Swing | | |

Kwai Tsing District Board Election, 1994: Kwai Shing East Estate
| Party | Candidate | Votes | % | ±% |
|---|---|---|---|---|
| ADPL | Leung Kwong-cheong | 1,169 | 59.98 | |
| Nonpartisan | Leung Chiu-kuen | 780 | 40.02 | |
| Majority | | 389 | 19.96 | |
| ADPL win (new seat) | | | | |
