= Kai Yip (constituency) =

Hong Kong constituency

- Elected constituency for the Kwun Tong District Council
- Boundary of Kai Yip in Kwun Tong District
- District: Kwun Tong
- Legislative Council constituency: Kowloon East
- Population: 20,355 (2019)
- Electorate: 11,752 (2019)

Current constituency
- Created: 1994
- Number of members: One
- Member: Wan Ka-him (Democratic)
- Created from: Ping Shek & Kai Yip

Kai Yip (Chinese: 啟業) is one of the 37 constituencies in the Kwun Tong District of Hong Kong which was created in 1994 and currently held by Au Yeung Kwan-nok of the Democratic Alliance for the Betterment and Progress of Hong Kong.

The constituency loosely covers Kai Yip Estate and Kai Tai Court in Kowloon Bay with the estimated population of 20,355.

== Councillors represented ==
| Election | Member | Party |
|---|---|---|
| 1994 | Grace Au Yuk-har | ADPL |
| 199? | Grace Au Yuk-har | Democratic |
| 2007 by-election | Sze Lun-hung | DAB |
| 2015 | Au Yeung Kwan-nok | DAB |
| 2019 | Wan Ka-him | Democratic |

== Election results ==
=== 2010s ===
Kwun Tong District Council Election, 2019: Kai Yip
| Party | Candidate | Votes | % | ±% |
|---|---|---|---|---|
| Democratic | Wan Ka-him | 4,433 | 53.88 | +7.70 |
| DAB | Au Yeung Kwan-nok | 3,794 | 46.12 | −7.70 |
| Majority | | 639 | 7.76 | |
| Turnout | | 5,859 | 70.82 | |
| Democratic gain from DAB | | Swing | | |

Kwun Tong District Council Election, 2015: Kai Yip
| Party | Candidate | Votes | % | ±% |
|---|---|---|---|---|
| DAB | Au Yeung Kwan-nok | 2,128 | 53.82 | |
| Democratic | Lam Sing | 1,826 | 46.18 | |
| Majority | | 302 | 7.64 | |
| Turnout | | 3,954 | 48.62 | |
| DAB hold | | Swing | | |

Kwun Tong District Council Election, 2011: Kai Yip
| Party | Candidate | Votes | % | ±% |
|---|---|---|---|---|
| DAB | Sze Lun-hung | Unopposed | | |
| DAB hold | | Swing | | |

=== 2000s ===
Kwun Tong District Council Election, 2007: Kai Yip
| Party | Candidate | Votes | % | ±% |
|---|---|---|---|---|
| DAB | Sze Lun-hung | Unopposed | | |
| DAB hold | | Swing | | |

Kai Yip by-election 2007
| Party | Candidate | Votes | % | ±% |
|---|---|---|---|---|
| DAB | Sze Lun-hung | 2,020 | 59.91 | +15.89 |
| Nonpartisan | Frederick Lam Fai | 1,352 | 40.09 | |
| Majority | | 668 | 19.82 | |
| DAB gain from Democratic | | Swing | | |

Kwun Tong District Council Election, 2003: Kai Yip
| Party | Candidate | Votes | % | ±% |
|---|---|---|---|---|
| Democratic | Grace Au Yuk-har | 2,030 | 55.98 | −12.28 |
| DAB | Sze Lun-hung | 1,596 | 44.02 | +12.28 |
| Majority | | 434 | 11.96 | |
| Democratic hold | | Swing | −12.28 | |

=== 1990s ===
Kwun Tong District Council Election, 1999: Kai Yip
| Party | Candidate | Votes | % | ±% |
|---|---|---|---|---|
| Democratic | Grace Au Yuk-har | 2,060 | 68.26 | −0.19 |
| DAB | Tam Wai-leung | 958 | 31.74 | |
| Majority | | 1,102 | 36.52 | |
| Democratic hold | | Swing | | |

Kwun Tong District Board Election, 1994: Kai Yip
| Party | Candidate | Votes | % | ±% |
|---|---|---|---|---|
| ADPL | Grace Au Yuk-har | 2,052 | 68.45 | |
| KTMCFPA | Au Wai-king | 946 | 31.55 | |
| Majority | | 1,106 | 30.90 | |
| ADPL win (new seat) | | | | |
