= Tang Siu-tong =

- 鄧兆棠

Personal details
- Born: 26 September 1941 (age 84) Hong Kong
- Party: Democratic Alliance for the Betterment and Progress of Hong Kong
- Spouse: Sandra Lui
- Occupation: Doctor

Tang Siu-tong
- Traditional Chinese: 鄧兆棠
- Simplified Chinese: 邓兆棠
Transcriptions
Standard Mandarin
- Hanyu Pinyin: Dèng Zhaòtáng

Tang Siu-tong, SBS, JP (born 26 September 1942 in Hong Kong), was a member of the Legislative Council of Hong Kong from 1992 to 2004. He is also a registered doctor in Yuen Long, Hong Kong.

== Early life ==
Tang received his MBBS from the University of Adelaide in 1968. In 1974, he received a FRCS from the Royal Society of Edinburgh and his FRCPS from the Royal College of Physicians and Surgeons of Glasgow. Tang received the FHKAM in Surgery from the Hong Kong Academy of Medicine in 1993.

Political offices
| Preceded by Tai Kuen | Chairman of the Yuen Long District Council; 2000–2008 | Succeeded by Leung Che-cheung |
Legislative Council of Hong Kong
| Preceded by Ng Ming-yum | Member of Legislative Council; Representative for New Territories West; 1992–1995 | Succeeded by Albert Ho |
| New parliament | Member of Provisional Legislative Council; 1997–1998 | Replaced by Legislative Council |
| New parliament | Member of Legislative Council; Representative for Regional Council; 1998–1999 | Succeeded by Ip Kwok-him as Representative for District Councils |
| New constituency | Member of Legislative Council; Representative for New Territories West; 2000–2004 | Succeeded by Lee Wing-tat |
