= Public Offices (Candidacy and Taking Up Offices) (Miscellaneous Amendments) Ordinance 2021 =

Legislation of Hong Kong

Legislative Council of Hong Kong
- Long title: An Ordinance to amend the Interpretation and General Clauses Ordinance to explain the meaning of a reference to upholding the Basic Law and bearing allegiance to the Hong Kong Special Administrative Region of the People's Republic of China; to amend the Oaths and Declarations Ordinance to include in Part IV of the Ordinance an oath to be taken by every member of the District Councils, the requirements for taking the oaths specified in that Part and the consequences of declining or neglecting to take an oath; to amend the Legislative Council Ordinance and the District Councils Ordinance to add new grounds for disqualification from being nominated as a candidate for election as a member of the Legislative Council or as a member of a District Council and for disqualification from being elected, and from holding office, as such a member, to remove the time limit within which proceedings may be brought by the Secretary for Justice against a person on the ground of disqualification from acting as such a member and to provide for suspension of functions and duties of such a member on certain of such proceedings being brought by the Secretary for Justice; to amend the Hong Kong Court of Final Appeal Ordinance to provide for application for leave to appeal to the Hong Kong Court of Final Appeal in relation to such proceedings; to amend the Chief Executive Election Ordinance to add new grounds for disqualification from being nominated as a candidate for election of the Chief Executive and from being elected as the Chief Executive; to amend the National Anthem Ordinance to add the oath-taking ceremony by members of the District Councils as an occasion on which the national anthem must be played and sung; and to provide for related matters.
- Citation: Ordinance 13 of 2021
- Territorial extent: Hong Kong
- Enacted by: Legislative Council of Hong Kong
- Signed: 20 May 2021
- Commenced: 21 May 2021

Legislative history
- Bill title: Public Offices (Candidacy and Taking Up Offices) (Miscellaneous Amendments) Bill 2021
- Introduced by: Secretary for Constitutional and Mainland Affairs Erick Tsang
- Introduced: 26 February 2021
- First reading: 17 March 2021
- Second reading: 12 May 2021
- Third reading: 12 May 2021

Amends
- Interpretation and General Clauses Ordinance; Oaths and Declarations Ordinance; Interpretation and General Clauses Ordinance; Hong Kong Court of Final Appeal Ordinance; Legislative Council Ordinance; District Councils Ordinance; Chief Executive Election Ordinance; National Anthem Ordinance; High Court Ordinance; Electoral Affairs Commission Ordinance
- Status: In force

The Public Offices (Candidacy and Taking Up Offices) (Miscellaneous Amendments) Ordinance 2021 (Chinese: 2021年公職(參選及任職)(雜項修訂)條例) is an ordinance to amend the Oaths and Declarations Ordinance (Cap. 11) and other relating legislation which adds new requirements for the Chief Executive, Executive Council members, Legislative Council members and judges and other judicial officers, imposes oath-taking requirements on District Council members, and specifies requirements for candidates to swear to uphold the Basic Law and bear allegiance to the Hong Kong Special Administrative Region when assuming office or standing for election and also adds new grounds and mechanism for disqualification from holding the office or being nominated as a candidate. The ordinance was seen as another round of the Beijing authorities to bar the opposition from standing in elections or holding public offices and also raised concerns on the bill's vague parameters of the oath with such over-reaching scope would undermine Hong Kong's judicial independence.

== Background ==
Article 104 of the Basic Law of Hong Kong and the Oaths and Declarations Ordinance (Cap. 11) originally stated that five categories of public officers, Chief Executive, principal officials, members of the Executive Council and of the Legislative Council, judges of the courts at all levels and other members of the judiciary must "swear to uphold the Basic Law of the Hong Kong Special Administrative Region of the People's Republic of China and swear allegiance to the Hong Kong Special Administrative Region of the People's Republic of China" when assuming office. However, penalty for violating the oath was not specified in the laws, and the District Councillors were not included in the categories.

In the 2016 New Territories East by-election for the Legislative Council, pro-independence activist Edward Leung ran for the office and fared a better-than-expected result by obtaining more than 15 per cent of the popular vote. In the following general election in September, the returning officers unprecedentedly invalidated Edward Leung and five other localists' nominations for their pro-independence inclination. The decision was challenged by the leading lawyers in Hong Kong, who questioned whether returning officers had the power to investigate the "genuineness" of candidates' declarations and accordingly disqualify their candidacies. In their joint statement, it wrote that "[the Section 40 of the Legislative Council Ordinance] does not give the returning officer any power to inquire into the so-called genuineness of the candidates' declarations, let alone making a subjective and political decision to disqualify a candidate without following any due process on the purported ground that the candidate will not genuinely uphold the Basic Law." It also wrote that "arbitrary and unlawful exercise of powers by government officials ... are most damaging to the rule of law in Hong Kong."

In the end, there were still six localist camp candidates who ran on the "right to self-determination" of Hong Kong got elected with 19 per cent of total vote share. Two localist legislators-elect, Baggio Leung and Yau Wai-ching of Youngspiration used the largely ritual oath-taking ceremony on the inaugural meeting of the Legislative Council on 12 October 2016 to protest, asserting "as a member of the Legislative Council, I shall pay earnest efforts in keeping guard over the interests of the Hong Kong nation," displayed a "Hong Kong is not China" banner, and mispronounced "People's Republic of China" as "people's re-fucking of Chee-na". As a result, Leung and Yau, as well as some other pro-democrats' oaths were invalidated by the Legislative Council President Andrew Leung. Chief Executive Leung Chun-ying and Secretary for Justice Rimsky Yuen also launched a judicial review against the duo. On 7 November 2016, the National People's Congress Standing Committee (NPCSC) controversially interpreted Article 104 of the Basic Law of Hong Kong to "clarify" the requirements that the legislators need to swear allegiance to Hong Kong as part of China when they take office, stating that a person "who intentionally reads out words which do not accord with the wording of the oath prescribed by law, or takes the oath in a manner which is not sincere or not solemn" should be barred from taking their public office and cannot retake the oath. As a result, Baggio Leung and Yau Wai-ching were unseated by the court, followed by four other opposition legislators, Leung Kwok-hung, Nathan Law, Lau Siu-lai and Yiu Chung-yim who were also disqualified for their oath-taking manner on 14 July 2017.

Another wave of disqualification of opposition candidates occurred in the subsequently postponed 2020 Legislative Council election, where 12 opposition candidates including four incumbent legislators Alvin Yeung, Kwok Ka-ki, Dennis Kwok and Kenneth Leung and also four incumbent District Councillors Tiffany Yuen, Lester Shum, Fergus Leung and Cheng Tat-hung were also barred from running. Despite Chief Executive Carrie Lam's reassurance on the four incumbent legislators' eligibility to serve in the extended Legislative Council term, the National People Congress Standing Committee (NPCSC) on 11 November 2020 ruled in a decision which barred Legislative Council members from supporting Hong Kong independence, refusing to recognise Beijing's sovereignty over Hong Kong, seeking help from "foreign countries or foreign forces to interfere in the affairs of the region" or committing "other acts that endanger national security", targeting the four sitting legislators. On the same day, the SAR administration announced that four legislators had been stripped of their seats with immediate effect. In response, the 15 remaining pro-democracy legislators announced they would resign en masse in solidarity with the disqualified members, leaving the legislature with virtually no opposition.

On 30 June 2020, the National People Congress Standing Committee (NPCSC) imposed the national security law on Hong Kong, which stipulates that a candidate who stands for election or assumes public office shall confirm in writing or take an oath to uphold the Basic Law and swear allegiance to the Hong Kong Special Administrative Region in accordance with the law besides other new restrictions, which required the amendment to the existing local legislation to implement the new requirements imposed by the NPCSC.

== Contents ==
According to the government's press release, the bill mainly comprises the following six key areas of amendments which seek to:

1. amend the Interpretation and General Clauses Ordinance (Cap. 1) to add the legal requirements and conditions of "upholding the Basic Law and bearing allegiance to the Hong Kong Special Administrative Region" with reference to the 2016 NPCSC Interpretation, the national security law and the 11 November 2020 NPCSC's "Decision on Issues Relating to the Qualification of the Members of the Legislative Council of the Hong Kong Special Administrative Region";
2. impose an oath-taking requirement for District Council members which would be required with the same criteria as other public officers under Article 104 of the Basic Law;
3. lay out the concrete oath-taking requirements in the Oaths and Declarations Ordinance (Cap. 11), including that the oath-taking should comply with the oath-taking procedure and ceremony; an oath taker who intentionally reads out words which do not accord with the wording of the oath prescribed by law, or takes the oath in a manner which is not sincere or not solemn, shall be treated as declining to take the oath. The oath so taken is invalid and the oath taker is disqualified forthwith from assuming the public office;
4. specify the arrangement of the oath administrator by standardising the arrangement for the Chief Executive or a person authorised by the Chief Executive to administer the oaths for Executive Council members, Legislative Council members, judges and other judicial officers, and District Council members;
5. amend the Legislative Council Ordinance (Cap. 542) and the District Councils Ordinance (Cap. 547) to specify that a person who has breached an oath, or failed to fulfil the legal requirements and conditions on upholding the Basic Law and bearing allegiance to the Hong Kong Special Administrative Region will be disqualified from holding the office; and provide for the mechanism in case of such a breach or failure; and
6. introduce restriction in Chief Executive, Legislative Council and District Council elections such that persons who have been disqualified from entering on an office for declining or neglecting to take an oath, breached an oath or failed to fulfill the legal requirements and conditions on "upholding the Basic Law and bearing allegiance to the Hong Kong Special Administrative Region", would be disqualified from being nominated or elected in the relevant elections held within five years.

== Concerns ==
Some concerns regarded the "negative list" which proscribed unpatriotic acts in the bill was far too vague and could put judges and politicians under intense pressure if their rulings or voting patterns were viewed as challenging the government. The bill intended to include the community-level District Councilors to be scrutinised for their oath-taking manners, was expected to pave the way for mass disqualification of the pro-democracy councillors who humiliated Beijing when they won District Council election by a landslide in 2019 amid the historic anti-government protests. The ranks of judges in Hong Kong, including leading foreign jurists, must also take oaths to Hong Kong under long-standing requirements, would also come under the new layer of outside political scrutiny. "These references are extremely vague and it creates more possible complications for how the judiciary itself has to regulate judges against these new standards," University of Hong Kong law professor Simon Young said. "There is still time to clarify things... the point is we should not be defining these specific parameters of the oath in such vague ways with such over-reaching scope that it could undermine judicial independence."

== Passage ==
The Public Offices (Candidacy and Taking Up Offices) (Miscellaneous Amendments) Bill 2021 was passed by a 40-to-1 vote in the pro-Beijing-dominated legislature on 12 May 2021, with Civic Passion's Cheng Chung-tai the only one voted against. Chief Executive Carrie Lam on 20 May signed the bill into the law which came into effect after it is published in the Gazette on 21 May.

== Effects ==
=== Resignations ===
In the past six months before the bill passage, dozens of opposition District Councillors resigned for refusal to take an oath under the new law. In early July 2021, the government reportedly considered banning 230 councillors to take oath of office and would ask them return their accrued salaries which worth around a million dollars. Such reports triggered a mass resignation of more than 260 councillors, while eight other had been unseated as they were in custody or had left the city.

| District | Constituency | Name | Political affiliation | Term End | Notes |
|---|---|---|---|---|---|
| Central and Western | Mid Levels East | Ng Siu-hong | Democratic | 1 May 2021 | Personal reasons |
| Central and Western | Castle Road | Cheng Lai-king | Democratic | 9 July 2021 | |
| Central and Western | University | Camille Yam Ka-yi | Ind. democrat | 12 July 2021 | |
| Central and Western | Kennedy Town & Mount Davis | Cherry Wong Kin-ching | Independent (previously Civic) | 4 June 2021 | Personal reasons |
| Central and Western | Shek Tong Tsui | Sam Yip Kam-lung | Ind. democrat | 8 July 2021 | |
| Central and Western | Sai Ying Pun | Wong Weng-chi | Ind. democrat | 11 July 2021 | |
| Central and Western | Sheung Wan | Kam Nai-wai | Democratic | 8 July 2021 | |
| Central and Western | Tung Wah | Bonnie Ng Hoi-yan | Democratic | 9 July 2021 | |
| Central and Western | Centre Street | Cheung Kai-yin | Democratic | 9 July 2021 | |
| Central and Western | Water Street | Ho Chi-wang | VSA | 27 May 2021 | Personal reasons |
| Wan Chai | Oi Kwan | Law Wai-shan | Ind. democrat | 9 July 2021 | |
| Wan Chai | Canal Road | Mak King-sing | Ind. democrat | 9 July 2021 | |
| Wan Chai | Causeway Bay | Cathy Yau Man-shan | Ind. democrat | 9 July 2021 | |
| Wan Chai | Victoria Park | Li Wing-choi | Ind. democrat | 9 July 2021 | |
| Wan Chai | Tin Hau | Chan Yuk-lam | Ind. democrat | 9 July 2021 | |
| Wan Chai | Happy Valley | Clara Cheung | Ind. democrat | 8 July 2021 | |
| Eastern | Tai Koo Shing West | Andrew Chiu Ka-yin | Democratic/PC | 8 July 2021 | |
| Eastern | Tai Koo Shing East | Patrick Wong Chun-sing | Ind. democrat | 8 July 2021 | |
| Eastern | Sai Wan Ho | Mak Tak-ching | Labour | 9 July 2021 | |
| Eastern | A Kung Ngam | Kwok Chi-chung | SKWEF | 9 July 2021 | |
| Eastern | Heng Fa Chuen | Christine Wong Yi | Ind. democrat | 1 April 2021 | Personal reasons |
| Eastern | Tsui Wan | Ku Kwai-yiu | Ind. democrat | 15 July 2021 | |
| Eastern | Yan Lam | Alice Ishigami Lee Fung-king | Ind. democrat | 11 July 2021 | |
| Eastern | King Yee | Phoenix Tsang Yan-ying | Ind. democrat | 1 June 2021 | |
| Eastern | Wan Tsui | Peter Ng Cheuk-ip | Ind. democrat | 10 July 2021 | |
| Eastern | Fei Tsui | Joseph Lai Chi-keong | Civic | 9 July 2021 | |
| Eastern | Fortress Hill | Jason Chan Ka-yau | Ind. democrat | 1 June 2021 | Protest against oath-taking |
| Eastern | Fort Street | Karrine Fu Kai-lam | Ind. democrat | 1 June 2021 | Protest against oath-taking |
| Eastern | Kam Ping | Lee Yue-shun | Independent (previously Civic) | 1 September 2021 | Personal reasons |
| Eastern | Tanner | Tat Cheng Tat-hung | Independent (previously Civic) | 11 May 2021 | Personal reasons |
| Eastern | Healthy Village | James Pui Chi-lap | Ind. democrat | 9 July 2021 | |
| Eastern | Quarry Bay | Kelly Chan Po-king | Ind. democrat | 8 July 2021 | |
| Eastern | Nam Fung | Cheung Kwok-cheong | Democratic | 15 July 2021 | |
| Eastern | Kornhill | Derek Ngai Chi-ho | Civic | 10 July 2021 | |
| Eastern | Kornhill Garden | Leung Siu-sun | Civic | 9 July 2021 | |
| Eastern | Hing Tung | Cheung Chun-kit | Ind. democrat | 8 July 2021 | |
| Eastern | Lower Yiu Tung | Ho Wai-lun | Labour | 9 July 2021 | |
| Eastern | Hing Man | Tse Miu-yee | Ind. democrat | 11 July 2021 | |
| Eastern | Lok Hong | Bull Tsang Kin-shing | LSD | 8 July 2021 | |
| Southern | Aberdeen | Angus Wong Yui-hei | Ind. democrat | 9 July 2021 | |
| Southern | Ap Lei Chau North | Chan Ping-yeung | Democratic | 9 July 2021 | |
| Southern | Lei Tung I | Chan Yan-yi | Democratic | 9 July 2021 | |
| Southern | Lei Tung II | Lo Kin-hei | Democratic | 11 July 2021 | |
| Southern | South Horizons East | James Yu Chun-hei | Independent (previously Civic) | 9 July 2021 | |
| Southern | South Horizons West | Kelvin Lam Ho-por | Ind. democrat | 11 July 2021 | |
| Southern | Wah Kwai | Poon Ping-hong | Democratic | 9 July 2021 | |
| Southern | Wah Fu South | Li Shee-lin | Democratic | 9 July 2021 | |
| Southern | Wah Fu North | Yim Chun-ho | Democratic | 9 July 2021 | |
| Southern | Chi Fu | Andrew Lam Tak-wo | Ind. democrat | 10 July 2021 | |
| Southern | Shek Yue | Chan Hin-chung | Ind. democrat | 9 July 2021 | |
| Southern | Wong Chuk Hang | Tsui Yuen-wa | Democratic | 9 July 2021 | |
| Yau Tsim Mong | Tsim Sha Tsui West | Leslie Chan Ka-long | Ind. democrat | 16 July 2021 | |
| Yau Tsim Mong | Jordan West | Natalie Tsui Wai-fong | Ind. democrat | 9 July 2021 | |
| Yau Tsim Mong | Fu Pak | Yu Tak-po | Independent (previously Civic) | 11 July 2021 | |
| Yau Tsim Mong | Tai Kok Tsui North | Owan Li | Ind. democrat | 9 July 2021 | |
| Yau Tsim Mong | Tai Nan | Lee Kwok-kuen | Community March | 8 July 2021 | |
| Yau Tsim Mong | Mong Kok North | Lucifer Siu Tak-kin | Ind. democrat | 10 July 2021 | |
| Yau Tsim Mong | Mong Kok East | Ben Lam | Community March | 9 July 2021 | |
| Yau Tsim Mong | Jordan South | Chan Tsz-wai | Ind. democrat | 12 July 2021 | |
| Yau Tsim Mong | Tsim Sha Tsui Central | Ho Cheuk-hin | Community March | 8 July 2021 | |
| Sham Shui Po | Nam Cheong North | Lao Ka-hang | Independent (previously Civic) | 12 July 2021 | |
| Sham Shui Po | Shek Kip Mei | Jeffrey Sin Kam-ho | Ind. democrat | 9 July 2021 | |
| Sham Shui Po | Nam Cheong East | Kalvin Ho Kai-ming | ADPL | 12 July 2021 | |
| Sham Shui Po | Nam Cheong West | Wai Woon-nam | ADPL | 8 July 2021 | |
| Sham Shui Po | Fu Cheong | Wong Kit-long | CSWWF | 8 July 2021 | |
| Sham Shui Po | Lai Kok | Li Kwing | ADPL | 8 July 2021 | |
| Sham Shui Po | Fortune | Ronald Tsui Yat-hin | ADPL | 9 July 2021 | |
| Sham Shui Po | Pik Wui | Zoe Chow Wing-heng | Democratic | 8 July 2021 | |
| Sham Shui Po | Lai Chi Kok South | Yeung Yuk | ADPL | 9 July 2021 | |
| Sham Shui Po | Mei Foo South | Chau Yuen-man | Civic | 1 June 2021 | Personal reasons |
| Sham Shui Po | Mei Foo North | Joshua Li Chun-hei | Independent (previously Civic) | 8 July 2021 | |
| Sham Shui Po | Un Chau | Lee Hon-ting | ADPL | 8 July 2021 | |
| Sham Shui Po | Lei Cheng Uk | Kong Kwai-sang | ADPL | 9 July 2021 | |
| Sham Shui Po | Ha Pak Tin | Yan Kai-wing | Ind. democrat | 9 July 2021 | |
| Sham Shui Po | Nam Shan, Tai Hang Tung & Tai Hang Sai | Tam Kwok-kiu | ADPL | 8 July 2021 | |
| Kowloon City | Ma Hang Chung | Lai Kwong-wai | Democratic | 9 July 2021 | |
| Kowloon City | Ma Tau Kok | Ma Hei-pang | Democratic | 9 July 2021 | |
| Kowloon City | Sheung Lok | Wong Wing-kit | Democratic | 11 July 2021 | |
| Kowloon City | Ho Man Tin | Joshua Fung Man-tao | Democratic | 9 July 2021 | |
| Kowloon City | Kadoorie | Siu Leong-sing | Democratic | 9 July 2021 | |
| Kowloon City | Whampoa East | Kwan Ka-lun | Ind. democrat | 8 July 2021 | |
| Kowloon City | Whampoa West | Kwong Po-yin | Ind. democrat | 8 July 2021 | |
| Kowloon City | Ka Wai | Chau Hei-man | Democratic | 12 July 2021 | |
| Kowloon City | Oi Man | Mak Sui-ki | Democratic | 11 July 2021 | |
| Wong Tai Sin | Lung Tsui | Chong Ting-wai | Ind. democrat | 11 July 2021 | |
| Wong Tai Sin | Lung Ha | Kwok Sau-ying | Ind. democrat | 10 July 2021 | |
| Wong Tai Sin | Lung Sheung | Chan Chun-yue | Ind. democrat | 11 July 2021 | |
| Wong Tai Sin | Fung Wong | Tang Wai-keung | Democratic | 9 July 2021 | |
| Wong Tai Sin | Fung Tak | Cheung Ka-yi | TWSCP | 11 July 2021 | |
| Wong Tai Sin | San Po Kong | Chan Kai-shun | Ind. democrat | 8 July 2021 | |
| Wong Tai Sin | Tung Tau | Hiroko Wan Chi-chung | People Power | 13 July 2021 | |
| Wong Tai Sin | Tung Mei | Sze Tak-loy | ADPL | 9 July 2021 | |
| Wong Tai Sin | Lok Fu | Leung Ming-hong | Ind. democrat | 8 July 2021 | |
| Wong Tai Sin | Wang Tau Hom | Carmen Lau Ka-man | Civic | 9 June 2021 | Protest against oath-taking |
| Wong Tai Sin | Tin Keung | Jay Cheng Man-kit | Independent (previously Civic) | 9 July 2021 | |
| Wong Tai Sin | Tsui Chuk & Pang Ching | Yau Hon-pong | Ind. democrat | 9 July 2021 | |
| Wong Tai Sin | Chuk Yuen South | Hui Kam-shing | ADPL | 8 July 2021 | |
| Wong Tai Sin | Chuk Yuen North | Cheng Tsz-kin | Ind. democrat | 1 June 2021 | Protest against political change |
| Wong Tai Sin | Tsz Wan West | Cheung Mau-ching | Democratic | 10 July 2021 | |
| Wong Tai Sin | Ching Oi | Sham Yu-hin | TWSCP | 11 July 2021 | |
| Wong Tai Sin | Ching On | Roger Wong Yat-yuk | Ind. democrat | 8 July 2021 | |
| Wong Tai Sin | Tsz Wan East | Mok Yee-ha | Ind. democrat | 10 July 2021 | |
| Wong Tai Sin | King Fu | Rosanda Mok Ka-han | Democratic | 9 July 2021 | |
| Wong Tai Sin | Choi Wan South | Shum Wan-wa | Democratic | 9 July 2021 | |
| Wong Tai Sin | Choi Wan West | Chan Lee-shing | Democratic | 9 July 2021 | |
| Wong Tai Sin | Chi Choi | Wu Chi-kin | Democratic | 10 July 2021 | |
| Kwun Tong | Kai Yip | Wan Ka-him | Democratic | 9 July 2021 | |
| Kwun Tong | Lai Ching | Sheik Anthony Bux | Civic | 1 June 2021 | Personal reasons |
| Kwun Tong | Shun Tin | Mok Kin-shing | Democratic | 20 July 2021 | |
| Kwun Tong | On Lee | Choy Chak-hung | Ind. democrat | 20 July 2021 | |
| Kwun Tong | Sau Mau Ping North | Raymond Tang Wai-man | Ind. democrat | 12 July 2021 | |
| Kwun Tong | Po Tat | Fung Ka-lung | Ind. democrat | 9 July 2021 | |
| Kwun Tong | Hing Tin | Nelson Ip Tsz-kit | Democratic | 10 July 2021 | |
| Kwun Tong | Ping Tin | Eason Chan Yik-shun | Ind. democrat | 12 July 2021 | |
| Kwun Tong | Pak Nga | Chan Man-kin | Democratic | 10 July 2021 | |
| Kwun Tong | Yau Tong East | Kung Chun-ki | Ind. democrat | 19 July 2021 | |
| Kwun Tong | Yau Lai | Wang Wai-lun | Ind. democrat | 18 July 2021 | |
| Kwun Tong | Laguna City | William Li Wai-lam | Independent (previously Civic) | 12 July 2021 | |
| Kwun Tong | King Tin | Wong Ka-ying | Independent (previously Civic) | 11 July 2021 | |
| Kwun Tong | Hiu Lai | Wilson Cheung Man-fung | Ind. democrat | 18 July 2021 | |
| Kwun Tong | Po Lok | Cheng Keng-ieong | Democratic | 9 July 2021 | |
| Kwun Tong | Yuet Wah | Jannelle Rosalynne Leung | Ind. democrat | 10 July 2021 | |
| Kwun Tong | Lok Wah North | Wong Chi-ken | KEC | 20 July 2021 | |
| Kwun Tong | Hong Lok | Chris Chan Ka-yin | Ind. democrat | 1 June 2021 | Personal reasons |
| Kwun Tong | Ting On | Wong Kai-ming | Democratic | 10 July 2021 | |
| Kwun Tong | Lower Ngau Tau Kok Estate | Li Wing-shan | Ind. democrat | 9 July 2021 | |
| Kwun Tong | To Tai | Lee Kwan-chak | Independent (previously Civic) | 11 July 2021 | |
| Tsuen Wan | Tak Wah | Jackson Lau | Deliberation TW | 11 July 2021 | |
| Tsuen Wan | Tsuen Wan West | Angus Yick Shing-chung | Democratic | 11 July 2021 | |
| Tsuen Wan | Clague Garden | Chan Kim-kam | Ind. democrat | 12 July 2021 | |
| Tsuen Wan | Luk Yeung | Roy Pun Long-chung | Independent (previously Neo Democrats) | 8 July 2021 | |
| Tsuen Wan | Tsuen Wan Rural | Norris Ng Hin-lung | Independent | 9 July 2021 | |
| Tsuen Wan | Ting Sham | Lau Chi-hung | Ind. democrat | 9 July 2021 | |
| Tsuen Wan | Lai To | Ronald Tse Man-chak | Ind. democrat | 9 July 2021 | |
| Tsuen Wan | Allway | Chiu Yan-loy | Labour | 18 July 2021 | |
| Tsuen Wan | Cheung Shek | Matthew Lai Man-fai | Democratic | 13 July 2021 | |
| Tuen Mun | Tuen Mun Town Centre | Alfred Lai Chun-wing | Democratic | 7 July 2021 | |
| Tuen Mun | Siu Tsui | Yan Pui-lam | Independent (previously Team Chu) | 8 July 2021 | |
| Tuen Mun | Yau Oi South | Lam Kin-cheung | Labour | 8 July 2021 | |
| Tuen Mun | Yau Oi North | Lam Ming-yan | Labour | 8 July 2021 | |
| Tuen Mun | Hing Tsak | Tsang Chun-hing | TMCN | 10 July 2021 | |
| Tuen Mun | So Kwun Wat | Ma Kee | Democratic | 1 June 2021 | |
| Tuen Mun | Sam Shing | Michael Mo Kwan-tai | Ind. democrat | 9 July 2021 | |
| Tuen Mun | Hanford | Beatrice Chu Shun-nga | Ind. democrat | 9 July 2021 | |
| Tuen Mun | Butterfly | Yeung Chi-hang | ADPL | 9 July 2021 | |
| Tuen Mun | Lok Tsui | Lo Chun-yu | Democratic | 8 July 2021 | |
| Tuen Mun | San King | Catherine Wong Lai-sheung | Democratic | 8 July 2021 | |
| Tuen Mun | Kin Sang | Law Pei-lee | Independent (previously Team Chu) | 9 July 2021 | |
| Tuen Mun | Siu Hong | Josephine Chan Shu-ying | Democratic | 7 July 2021 | |
| Tuen Mun | Fu Tai | Ho Kwok-ho | Empowering HK | 9 July 2021 | |
| Tuen Mun | Prime View | Ho Hang-mui | Democratic | 8 July 2021 | |
| Yuen Long | Fung Nin | Kisslan Chan King-lun | Ind. democrat | 15 July 2021 | |
| Yuen Long | Yuen Long Centre | Shek King-ching | Democratic Alliance | 13 July 2021 | |
| Yuen Long | Fung Cheung | Mak Ip-sing | Democratic Alliance | 13 July 2021 | |
| Yuen Long | Yuen Lung | Cheung Sau-yin | Ind. democrat | 22 October 2021 | Personal reasons |
| Yuen Long | Shap Pat Heung Central | Willis Fong Ho-hin | Action 18 | 9 July 2021 | |
| Yuen Long | Yuen Long Tung Tau | Lam Ting-wai | Democratic | 13 July 2021 | |
| Yuen Long | Shap Pat Heung East | Lee Chun-wai | Action 18 | 12 July 2021 | |
| Yuen Long | Shap Pat Heung West | Szeto Pok-man | Ind. democrat | 1 June 2021 | Personal reasons |
| Yuen Long | Ping Shan South | Leung Tak-ming | Independent (previously Team Chu) | 8 July 2021 | |
| Yuen Long | Hung Fuk | Eddie Chan Shu-fai | Independent (previously Team Chu) | 8 July 2021 | |
| Yuen Long | Shing Yan | Au Kwok-kuen | Independent (previously Team Chu) | 8 July 2021 | |
| Yuen Long | Tin Shing | Hau Man-kin | TSW Connection | 8 July 2021 | |
| Yuen Long | Tin Yiu | Ho Wai-pan | Ind. democrat | 14 July 2021 | |
| Yuen Long | Kingswood South | Katy Ng Yuk-ying | Democratic | 13 July 2021 | |
| Yuen Long | Shui Wah | Lam Chun | TSW Connection | 8 July 2021 | |
| Yuen Long | Yuet Yan | Hong Chin-wah | Ind. democrat | 14 July 2021 | |
| Yuen Long | Ching King | Kwok Man-ho | Democratic | 11 July 2021 | |
| Yuen Long | Fu Yan | Kwan Chun-sang | TSW Connection | 9 July 2021 | |
| Yuen Long | Yat Chak | Wong Wing-sze | Civic Passion | 3 September 2021 | Party dissolved |
| Yuen Long | Wang Yat | Mo Kai-hong | Ind. democrat | 12 July 2021 | |
| Yuen Long | Fairview Park | To Ka-lun | Ind. democrat | 1 May 2021 | |
| North | Cheung Wah | Chan Yuk-ming | Democratic | 8 July 2021 | |
| North | Wah Ming | Chan Wai-tat | Independent (previously Neo Democrats) | 8 July 2021 | |
| North | Yan Shing | Lam Shuk-ching | Neo Democrats | 1 June 2021 | Protest against oath-taking |
| North | Fanling South | Franco Cheung Ching-ho | Ind. democrat | 9 July 2021 | |
| North | Ching Ho | Yuen Ho-lun | Ind. democrat | 1 June 2021 | Protest against oath-taking |
| North | Yu Tai | Vincent Chan Chi-fung | Ind. democrat | 12 July 2021 | |
| North | Choi Yuen | Lam Tsz-king | Democratic | 8 July 2021 | |
| North | Tin Ping West | Kwok Long-fung | Democratic | 11 July 2021 | |
| North | Fung Tsui | Chiang Man-ching | Ind. democrat | 8 July 2021 | |
| North | Tin Ping East | Lau Ki-fung | Independent (previously Neo Democrats) | 8 July 2021 | Personal reasons |
| Tai Po | Tai Po Hui | Nick Lam Ming-yat | TPDA | 12 May 2021 | Personal reasons |
| Tai Po | Chung Ting | Man Nim-chi | Ind. democrat | 13 July 2021 | |
| Tai Po | Tai Po Central | Ray Au Chun-wah | Community Alliance/TPDA | 21 July 2021 | |
| Tai Po | Yee Fu | Yam Kai-bong | Independent (previously Neo Democrats) | 8 July 2021 | |
| Tai Po | Fu Ming Sun | Kwan Wing-yip | Independent (previously Neo Democrats) | 8 July 2021 | |
| Tai Po | Kwong Fuk & Plover Cove | Dalu Lin Kok-cheung | Ind. democrat | 11 May 2021 | Protest against political change |
| Tai Po | Wan Tau Tong | Wong Siu-kin | Civic Passion | 3 September 2021 | Party dissolved |
| Tai Po | San Fu | Max Wu Yiu-cheong | Neo Democrats | 11 May 2021 | Protest against political change |
| Tai Po | Po Nga | Paul Chow Yuen-wai | Independent (previously Neo Democrats) | 12 July 2021 | Personal reasons |
| Tai Po | Hong Lok Yuen | Manson Yiu Yeuk-sang | Ind. democrat | 17 May 2021 | Personal reasons |
| Sai Kung | Sai Kung Central | Zoe Leung Hin-yan | Sai Kung Commons | 10 July 2021 | |
| Sai Kung | Pak Sha Wan | Stanley Ho Wai-hong | Sai Kung Commons/Labour | 13 July 2021 | |
| Sai Kung | Sai Kung Islands | Debby Chan Ka-lam | Ind. democrat | 12 July 2021 | |
| Sai Kung | Hang Hau West | Yu Tsun-ning | TKO Shining | 30 September 2021 | Personal reasons |
| Sai Kung | Choi Kin | Chan Wai-lit | TKO Pioneers | 8 July 2021 | |
| Sai Kung | Kin Ming | Leung Li | Independent (previously Neo Democrats) | 1 June 2021 | Personal reasons |
| Sai Kung | Wai King | Brandon Kenneth Yip | TKO Shining | 11 July 2021 | |
| Sai Kung | Hoi Chun | Ivan Lai Wai-tong | Independent (previously Neo Democrats) | 12 July 2021 | |
| Sai Kung | Po Yee | Tse Ching-fung | CGPLTKO | 13 July 2021 | |
| Sai Kung | Fu Kwan | Luk Ping-choi | CGPLTKO/CA | 13 July 2021 | |
| Sai Kung | O Tong | Lui Man-kwong | Independent (previously Neo Democrats) | 13 July 2021 | |
| Sai Kung | Hong King | Frankie Lam Siu-chung | Independent (previously Neo Democrats) | 12 July 2021 | |
| Sai Kung | Po Lam | Fung Kwan-on | Independent (previously Neo Democrats) | 9 July 2021 | |
| Sai Kung | Wai Yan | Chun Hoi-shing | Independent (previously Neo Democrats) | 13 July 2021 | |
| Sai Kung | King Lam | Cheung Wai-chiu | TKO Pioneers | 9 July 2021 | |
| Sai Kung | Tak Ming | Cheng Chung-man | Ind. democrat | 13 July 2021 | |
| Sai Kung | Kwan Po | Lai Ming-chak | Neo Democrats | 1 May 2021 | Protest against oath-taking |
| Sha Tin | Lek Yuen | Jimmy Sham Tsz-kit | LSD | 8 July 2021 | |
| Sha Tin | City One | Wong Man-huen | Civic | 4 June 2021 | Protest against oath-taking |
| Sha Tin | Sha Kok | Billy Chan Shiu-yeung | Ind. democrat | 7 July 2021 | |
| Sha Tin | Pok Hong | Chiu Chu-pong | Independent (previously CST) | 9 July 2021 | |
| Sha Tin | Jat Chuen | Yau Man-chun | Ind. democrat | 9 July 2021 | |
| Sha Tin | Chun Fung | Chan Nok-hang | Independent (previously CST) | 30 September 2021 | Personal reasons |
| Sha Tin | Sun Tin Wai | Ching Cheung-ying | Democratic | 8 July 2021 | |
| Sha Tin | Chui Tin | Hui Yui-yu | Ind. democrat | 9 July 2021 | |
| Sha Tin | Hin Ka | Chan Wang-tung | Ind. democrat | 8 July 2021 | |
| Sha Tin | Wan Shing | Cheung Hing-wa | Independent (previously Neo Democrats) | 8 July 2021 | |
| Sha Tin | Tin Sum | Tsang Kit | Independent (previously CST) | 15 July 2021 | |
| Sha Tin | Chui Ka | Li Sai-hung | Ind. democrat | 10 July 2021 | |
| Sha Tin | Sui Wo | Mak Tsz-kin | Independent (previously Civic) | 11 July 2021 | |
| Sha Tin | Fo Tan | Lui Kai-wing | Independent (previously Civic) | 15 July 2021 | |
| Sha Tin | Hoi Nam | Chan Pui-ming | Civic | 2 October 2021 | Protest against oath-taking |
| Sha Tin | Chung On | Yip Wing | Labour | 8 July 2021 | |
| Sha Tin | Wu Kai Sha | Li Wing-shing | Independent (previously CST) | 7 July 2021 | |
| Sha Tin | Fu Lung | Tsang So-lai | Democratic | 9 July 2021 | |
| Sha Tin | Kam Ying | Ting Tsz-yuen | Community Sha Tin | 1 June 2021 | Protest against political change |
| Sha Tin | Tai Shui Hang | Michael Yung Ming-chau | Civic | 12 July 2021 | |
| Sha Tin | Yu Yan | Lo Yuet-chau | STCV | 8 July 2021 | |
| Sha Tin | Bik Woo | Luk Tsz-tung | Independent (previously Civic) | 12 July 2021 | |
| Sha Tin | Kwong Hong | Ricardo Liao Pak-hong | Ind. democrat | 9 July 2021 | |
| Sha Tin | Kwong Yuen | Yeung Sze-kin | Ind. democrat | 8 July 2021 | |
| Kwai Tsing | Kwai Luen | Ng Kim-sing | Democratic | 10 July 2021 | |
| Kwai Tsing | Kwai Shing East Estate | Rayman Chow Wai-hung | Ind. democrat | 19 July 2021 | |
| Kwai Tsing | Upper Tai Wo Hau | Hui Kei-cheung | Democratic | 10 July 2021 | |
| Kwai Tsing | Lower Tai Wo Hau | Wong Bing-kuen | Democratic | 9 July 2021 | |
| Kwai Tsing | Kwai Chung Estate South | Ivan Wong Yun-tat | Ind. democrat | 1 June 2021 | |
| Kwai Tsing | On Yam | Leung Wing-kuen | Democratic | 10 July 2021 | |
| Kwai Tsing | Shek Lei South | Leung Kwok-wah | Democratic | 9 July 2021 | |
| Kwai Tsing | Lai Wah | Steve Cheung Kwan-kiu | Independent (previously Civic) | 8 July 2021 | |
| Kwai Tsing | Cho Yiu | Choi Nga-man | Ind. democrat | 9 July 2021 | |
| Kwai Tsing | Lai King | Wong Tin-yan | Ind. democrat | 8 July 2021 | |
| Kwai Tsing | On Ho | Warren Tam Ka-chun | Independent (previously Civic) | 12 July 2021 | |
| Kwai Tsing | Wai Ying | Henry Sin Ho-fai | Independent (previously Civic) | 9 July 2021 | |
| Kwai Tsing | Tsing Yi Estate | Wong Pit-man | Tsing Yi People | 9 July 2021 | |
| Kwai Tsing | Greenfield | Wong Chun-tat | Ind. democrat | 10 July 2021 | |
| Kwai Tsing | Cheung Ching | Nicholas Hon Chun-yin | Democratic | 9 July 2021 | |
| Kwai Tsing | Ching Fat | Lau Chi-kit | Democratic | 12 July 2021 | |
| Kwai Tsing | Cheung On | Dennis Cheung Man-lung | Ind. democrat | 20 July 2021 | |
| Islands | Tung Chung Central | Lee Ka-ho | Independent (previously Civic) | 9 July 2021 | |
| Islands | Discovery Bay | Amy Yung Wing-sheung | Independent (previously Civic) | 10 July 2021 | |
| Islands | Cheung Chau | Leung Kwok-ho | Ind. democrat | 11 July 2021 | |

=== Disqualifications ===
The government began the oath-taking ceremonies for the District Councillors from September 2021, and said it would consider the past conduct of the oath-takers when reviewing whether their pledges of allegiance are sincere. Following four oath-taking ceremonies starting in early September, oaths taken by 49 District Councillors were ruled invalid without any explanation, leaving more than 70 per cent seats in the 18 District Councils vacant. Under the amended Oaths and Declarations Ordinance, the disqualified District Councillors would be banned from standing in elections for the next five years, including former Democratic Legislative Councillor Roy Kwong and James To and some other Democrats who had expressed their interest in running in the upcoming Legislative Council election in December.

| District | Constituency | Name | Political affiliation | Term End | Notes |
|---|---|---|---|---|---|
| Wan Chai | Tai Hang | Clarisse Yeung Suet-ying | Ind. democrat | 15 September 2021 | Oath invalid |
| Wan Chai | Tai Fat Hau | Leung Pak-kin | Ind. democrat | 15 September 2021 | Oath invalid |
| Eastern | Lei King Wan | Alice Wei Siu-lik | Ind. democrat | 15 September 2021 | Oath invalid |
| Eastern | Aldrich Bay | So Yat-hang | Democratic | 15 September 2021 | Oath invalid |
| Eastern | Siu Sai Wan | Chan Wing-tai | Ind. democrat | 15 September 2021 | Oath invalid |
| Eastern | Tsui Tak | Peter Choi Chi-keung | Ind. democrat | 10 September 2021 | Declined oath-taking |
| Eastern | Kai Hiu | Lai Tsz-yan | Ind. democrat | 15 September 2021 | Oath invalid |
| Southern | Tin Wan | Tiffany Yuen Ka-wai | Ind. democrat | 21 May 2021 | Requirements not met |
| Southern | Stanley & Shek O | Michael Pang Cheuk-kei | Ind. democrat | 15 September 2021 | Oath invalid |
| Yau Tsim Mong | Yau Ma Tei South | Suzanne Wu Sui-shan | Independent (previously Community March) | 29 September 2021 | Oath invalid |
| Yau Tsim Mong | Olympic | James To Kun-sun | Democratic | 29 September 2021 | Oath invalid |
| Yau Tsim Mong | Tai Kok Tsui South | Tsang Tsz-ming | Democratic | 29 September 2021 | Oath invalid |
| Yau Tsim Mong | Mong Kok South | Chu Kong-wai | Independent (previously Community March) | 29 September 2021 | Oath invalid |
| Sham Shui Po | Cheung Sha Wan | Leos Lee Man-ho | Independent (previously CSWCEP) | 24 September 2021 | Declined oath-taking |
| Sham Shui Po | Yau Yat Tsuen | Lau Wai-chung | Ind. democrat | 29 September 2021 | Oath invalid |
| Kowloon City | Ma Tau Wai | Tsang Kin-chiu | Ind. democrat | 29 September 2021 | Oath invalid |
| Kowloon City | Hok Yuen Laguna Verde | Tony Kwok Tin-lap | Democratic/PC | 29 September 2021 | Oath invalid |
| Kowloon City | Hung Hom Bay | Pius Yum Kwok-tung | Democratic | 29 September 2021 | Oath invalid |
| Wong Tai Sin | Choi Hung | Sean Mock Ho-chit | CHESSA | 29 September 2021 | Oath invalid |
| Kwun Tong | Kwun Tong Central | Edith Leung Yik-ting | Democratic | 29 September 2021 | Oath invalid |
| Tsuen Wan | Yeung Uk Road | Lam Sek-tim | TWCN | 21 October 2021 | Oath invalid |
| Tsuen Wan | Hoi Bun | Lester Shum | Independent (previously Team Chu) | 21 May 2021 | Requirements not met |
| Tsuen Wan | Tsuen Wan Centre | Li Hung-por | Democratic | 21 October 2021 | Oath invalid |
| Tuen Mun | Tsui Hing | Poon Chi-kin | Independent (previously TMCN) | 7 October 2021 | Declined oath-taking |
| Tuen Mun | Fu Sun | Lee Ka-wai | Ind. democrat | 17 July 2021 | Absent meetings |
| Tuen Mun | Lung Mun | Tsang Kam-wing | LMCG | 21 October 2021 | Oath invalid |
| Tuen Mun | Leung King | Wong Tak-yuen | Independent (previously TMCN) | 7 October 2021 | Declined oath-taking |
| Tuen Mun | Tuen Mun Rural | Kenneth Cheung Kam-hung | Ind. democrat | 21 October 2021 | Oath invalid |
| Yuen Long | Shui Pin | Lai Kwok-wing | Independent (previously Team Chu) | 21 October 2021 | Oath invalid |
| Yuen Long | Nam Ping | Zachary Wong Wai-yin | Democratic | 21 October 2021 | Oath invalid |
| Yuen Long | Pek Long | Kwong Chun-yu | Democratic | 21 October 2021 | Oath invalid |
| Yuen Long | Ping Shan Central | Felix Cheung Chi-yeung | Ind. democrat | 21 October 2021 | Oath invalid |
| Yuen Long | Yiu Yau | Ng Hin-wang | Democratic | 21 October 2021 | Oath invalid |
| Yuen Long | Shui Oi | Lai Po-wa | Democratic | 21 October 2021 | Oath invalid |
| Yuen Long | Chung Wah | Chan Sze-nga | Ind. democrat | 21 October 2021 | Oath invalid |
| Yuen Long | Chung Pak | Lee Wai-fung | TSWLPU | 21 October 2021 | Oath invalid |
| Yuen Long | Kam Tin | Chris Li Chung-chi | Ind. democrat | 7 October 2021 | Declined oath-taking |
| Tai Po | Lam Tsuen Valley | Richard Chan Chun-chit | Independent (previously TPDA) | 8 October 2021 | Oath invalid |
| Tai Po | Tai Wo | Olive Chan Wai-ka | Ind. democrat | 8 October 2021 | Oath invalid |
| Tai Po | Shuen Wan | So Tat-leung | Ind. democrat | 8 October 2021 | Oath invalid |
| Sai Kung | Hang Hau East | Ryan Lee Yin-ho | Independent (previously CGPLTKO) | 8 October 2021 | Oath invalid |
| Sai Kung | Sheung Tak | Lee Ka-yui | Independent (previously CGPLTKO) | 8 October 2021 | Oath invalid |
| Sai Kung | Kwong Ming | Ricky Or Yiu-lam | Independent (previously CGPLTKO) | 8 October 2021 | Oath invalid |
| Sai Kung | Hau Tak | Wong Cheuk-nga | Ind. democrat | 8 October 2021 | Oath invalid |
| Sha Tin | Wo Che Estate | Li Chi-wang | Ind. democrat | 8 October 2021 | Oath invalid |
| Sha Tin | Yue Shing | William Shek | Independent (previously CST) | 8 October 2021 | Oath invalid |
| Sha Tin | Wong Uk | Lai Tsz-yan | Independent (previously CST) | 8 October 2021 | Oath invalid |
| Sha Tin | Shui Chuen O | Lo Tak-ming | Independent (previously CST) | 8 October 2021 | Oath invalid |
| Sha Tin | Lower Shing Mun | Ken Wong Ho-fung | Independent (previously CST) | 8 October 2021 | Oath invalid |
| Sha Tin | Keng Hau | Ng Kam-hung | Independent (previously CST) | 8 October 2021 | Oath invalid |
| Sha Tin | Tai Wai | Kudama Ng Ting-lam | Democratic | 8 October 2021 | Oath invalid |
| Sha Tin | Chung Tin | Wong Hok-lai | Independent (previously CST) | 8 October 2021 | Oath invalid |
| Sha Tin | Heng On | Cheng Tsuk-man | Democratic | 8 October 2021 | Oath invalid |
| Kwai Tsing | Hing Fong | Tong Ho-man | Democratic | 21 October 2021 | Oath invalid |
| Kwai Tsing | Kwai Shing West Estate | Ivy Leung Ching-shan | Independent (previously NWSC) | 21 October 2021 | Oath invalid |
| Kwai Tsing | Tsing Yi South | Daniel Kwok Tsz-kin | Ind. democrat | 7 October 2021 | Declined oath-taking |
| Islands | Tung Chung South | Sheep Wong Chun-yeung | Ind. democrat | 21 October 2021 | Oath invalid |
| Islands | Tung Chung North | Sammy Tsui Sang-hung | Democratic | 21 October 2021 | Oath invalid |

=== Responses ===
On 21 October 2021, UK Foreign Secretary Liz Truss issued a statement on the disqualification of District Councillors in Hong Kong, expressing its concern on the disqualifications of 55 District Councillors and resignations of over 250 who were pressured for political reasons. "The Hong Kong SAR Government must uphold freedom of speech and allow the public a genuine choice of political representatives," the statement wrote.

The United States also slammed the mass disqualification. "These retroactive and targeted disqualifications, based on the Hong Kong authorities’ arbitrary determination that these district councillors' loyalty oaths are invalid, prevent people in Hong Kong from participating meaningfully in their own governance," US State Department spokesman Ned Price said on 21 October.

In the 21 October statement, an EU spokesperson said that the expulsions and resignations negate the results of the 2019 District Council election and had weakened Hong Kong's "democratic governance structure". "The protection of civil and political rights in Hong Kong is a fundamental part of the 'One Country, Two Systems' principle, which the EU supports," the spokesperson said. "The EU calls on China to act in accordance with its international commitments and its legal obligations and to respect Hong Kong's high degree of autonomy and rights and freedoms."
