= Heng Fa Chuen (constituency) =

Hong Kong constituency

- Elected constituency for the Eastern District Council
- Boundary of Heng Fa Chuen in Eastern District
- District: Eastern
- Legislative Council constituency: Hong Kong Island East
- Population: 18,597 (2019)
- Electorate: 11,641 (2019)

Current constituency
- Created: 1991
- Number of members: One
- Member: Vacant

Heng Fa Chuen is one of the 35 constituencies in the Eastern District.

The constituency returns one district councillor to the Eastern District Council, with an election every four years. The seat is currently held by Wong Kwok-hing of the Hong Kong Federation of Trade Unions.

Heng Fa Chuen constituency is loosely based on Heng Fa Chuen with estimated population of 18,597.

== Councillors represented ==
| Election | Member | Party | % |
|---|---|---|---|
| 1991 | Manuel Chan Tim-shing | Independent→Democratic | 51.68 |
| 1994 | Manuel Chan Tim-shing | Democratic→Citizens | 53.52 |
| 1999 | Manuel Chan Tim-shing | Citizens→Independent | 59.12 |
| 2003 | Manuel Chan Tim-shing | Independent | 64.24 |
| 2007 | Manuel Chan Tim-shing | Independent | 55.86 |
| 2011 | Stanley Ho Ngai-kam | FTU | 57.24 |
| 2015 | Stanley Ho Ngai-kam | FTU | 58.02 |
| 2019 | Christine Wong Yi→Vacant (Note: Resigned on 31 March 2021 over new oath-taking law.) | Independent | 56.41 |

== Election results ==
=== 2010s ===
Eastern District Council Election, 2019: Heng Fa Chuen
| Party | Candidate | Votes | % | ±% |
|---|---|---|---|---|
| Independent | Christine Wong Yi | 5,323 | 56.41 | |
| FTU | Stanley Ho Ngai-kam | 4,114 | 43.59 | −14.41 |
| Majority | | 1,209 | 12.82 | |
| Turnout | | 9,463 | 81.29 | |
| Independent gain from FTU | | Swing | | |

Eastern District Council Election, 2015: Heng Fa Chuen
| Party | Candidate | Votes | % | ±% |
|---|---|---|---|---|
| FTU | Stanley Ho Ngai-kam | 3,642 | 58.0 | +0.8 |
| Independent | Chow Wing-yee | 2,025 | 32.3 | |
| Independent | Yeung Wai-hong | 610 | 9.7 | |
| Majority | | 1,617 | 25.7 | |
| Turnout | | 6,277 | 59.0 | |
| FTU hold | | Swing | | |

Eastern District Council Election, 2011: Heng Fa Chuen
| Party | Candidate | Votes | % | ±% |
|---|---|---|---|---|
| FTU | Stanley Ho Ngai-kam | 2,577 | 57.2 | |
| Independent | Manuel Chan Tim-shing | 1,925 | 42.8 | −13.1 |
| Majority | | 652 | 14.4 | |
| Turnout | | 4,502 | 44.5 | |
| FTU gain from Independent | | Swing | | |

=== 2000s ===
Eastern District Council Election, 2007: Heng Fa Chuen
| Party | Candidate | Votes | % | ±% |
|---|---|---|---|---|
| Independent | Manuel Chan Tim-shing | 2,188 | 55.9 | −8.3 |
| DAB | Ng King-wah | 1,729 | 44.1 | |
| Majority | | 459 | 11.8 | |
| Independent hold | | Swing | | |

Eastern District Council Election, 2003: Heng Fa Chuen
| Party | Candidate | Votes | % | ±% |
|---|---|---|---|---|
| Independent | Manuel Chan Tim-shing | 2,553 | 64.2 | +5.1 |
| Independent | Lau Kwok-wah | 1,421 | 35.8 | |
| Majority | | 1,132 | 28.4 | |
| Independent hold | | Swing | | |

=== 1990s ===
Eastern District Council Election, 1999: Heng Fa Chuen
| Party | Candidate | Votes | % | ±% |
|---|---|---|---|---|
| Citizens | Manuel Chan Tim-shing | 2,072 | 59.1 | +5.6 |
| DAB | Tse Chi-yung | 1,433 | 40.9 | −5.6 |
| Majority | | 639 | 18.2 | |
| Citizens hold | | Swing | +5.6 | |

Eastern District Board Election, 1994: Heng Fa Chuen
| Party | Candidate | Votes | % | ±% |
|---|---|---|---|---|
| Democratic | Manuel Chan Tim-shing | 1,855 | 53.5 | +1.8 |
| DAB | Chao Shing-kie | 1,611 | 46.5 | |
| Majority | | 244 | 7.0 | |
| Democratic hold | | Swing | | |

Eastern District Board Election, 1991: Heng Fa Chuen
| Party | Candidate | Votes | % | ±% |
|---|---|---|---|---|
| Independent | Manuel Chan Tim-shing | 1,340 | 51.7 | |
| Independent | William Leung King-wai | 677 | 26.1 | |
| Independent | Chan Ting-lai | 576 | 22.2 | |
| Majority | | 663 | 25.6 | |
| Independent win (new seat) | | | | |
