= Wah Ming (constituency) =

- Elected constituency for the North District Council
- Boundary of Wah Ming in North District
- District: North
- Legislative Council constituency: New Territories North
- Population: 16,202 (2019)
- Electorate: 12,319 (2019)

Current constituency
- Created: 1991
- Number of members: One
- Member: vacant

Wah Ming (Chinese: 華明) is one of the 18 constituencies in the North District, Hong Kong.

The constituency returns one district councillor to the North District Council, with an election every four years.

Wah Ming constituency has an estimated population of 16,202.

== Councillors represented ==
Election	Member	Party
1991	Wan Chung-ping	Nonpartisan→DAB
1994	Wan Chung-ping	DAB
1999	Wong Leung-hi	Democratic
2003	Wong Leung-hi	Democratic
2007	Lai Sum	DAB
2011	Lai Sum	DAB
2015	Chan Wai-tat→Vacant	Neo Democrats
2019	Chan Wai-tat→Vacant	Neo Democrats→Independent

== Election results ==
=== 2010s ===
North District Council Election, 2019: Wah Ming
Party	Candidate	Votes	%	±%
Neo Democrats	Chan Wai-tat	5,314	61.42	
DAB	Pun Hau-man	3,124	36.11	
Nonpartisan	Lau Ka-ho	214	2.47	
Majority		2,190	5.51	
Turnout		8,675	70.53	
Neo Democrats hold		Swing		
