= Fairview Park (constituency) =

Legislative Assembly, Honk Kong

- Elected constituency for the Yuen Long District Council
- Boundary of Fairview Park in Yuen Long District
- District: Yuen Long
- Legislative Council constituency: New Territories North
- Population: 20,038 (2019)
- Electorate: 11,097 (2019)

Current constituency
- Created: 1991
- Number of members: One
- Member: Vacant

Fairview Park (Chinese: 錦綉花園) is one of the 39 constituencies in the Yuen Long District of Hong Kong.

The constituency returns one district councillor to the Yuen Long District Council, with an election every four years. Fairview Park constituency is loosely based on Fairview Park, Man Yuen Chuen, Palm Springs, Royal Camellia, Royal Palms and Villa Camellia with estimated population of 20,038.

== Councillors represented ==
Election	Member	Party
1991	Yau Tai-tai	Nonpartisan
2015	To Ka-lun→Vacant (Note: Resigned on 30 April 2021 over new oath-taking law.)	Nonpartisan

== Election results ==
=== 2010s ===
Yuen Long District Council Election, 2019: Fairview Park
Party	Candidate	Votes	%	±%
Nonpartisan	To Ka-lun	4,329	55.41	
BPA	Cheung Kung-fat	3,211	41.10	
Independent	Allan Wong Wing-ho	195	2.50	
Nonpartisan	Chan Sang-fat	77	0.97	
Majority		1,118	4.31	
Turnout		7,830	70.59	
Nonpartisan hold		Swing		
