= Tai Wo (constituency) =

- Elected constituency for the Tai Po District Council
- Boundary of Tai Wo in Tai Po District
- District: Tai Po
- Legislative Council constituency: New Territories North East
- Population: 13,735 (2019)
- Electorate: 11,074 (2019)

Current constituency
- Created: 1994
- Number of members: One
- Member: Vacant

Tai Wo (Chinese: 太和) is one of the 19 constituencies in the Tai Po District of Hong Kong.

The constituency returns one district councillor to the Tai Po District Council, with an election every four years.

Tai Wo constituency has an estimated population of 13,735.

== Councillors represented ==
=== 1991 to 1994 ===
Election	First Member	First Party	Second Member	Second Party
1991	Cheng Chun-wo	TPRA	Wong Yung-kan	TPRA

=== 1994 to present ===
Election	Member	Party
1994	Cheng Chun-wo	LDF
1999	Cheng Chun-wo	Progressive Alliance
2005	Cheng Chun-wo	Independent
2019	Olive Chan Wai-ka→Vacant	Independent democrat

== Election results ==
=== 2010s ===
Tai Po District Council Election, 2019: Tai Wo
Party	Candidate	Votes	%	±%
Ind. democrat	Olive Chan Wai-ka	4,370	58.56	
Independent	Cheng Chun-wo	3,093	41.44	
Majority		1,277	17.12	
Turnout		7,482	67.65	
Ind. democrat gain from Independent		Swing		
