= Kwun Tong Future =

Kwun Tong Future 觀塘願景
- Leader: Jannelle Rosalynne Leung
- Founded: 29 June 2019; 7 years ago
- Ideology: Liberalism (Hong Kong); Social liberalism
- Regional affiliation: Pro-democracy camp
- Colours: Orange
- Legislative Council: 0 / 90
- District Councils: 0 / 470

Website
- http://www.facebook.com/kwuntongfuture/

Kwun Tong Future (Chinese: 觀塘願景) is a pro-democracy political group based in Kwun Tong, Hong Kong. It was founded in 2019. It has 1 seat in the District Councils.

== Performance in elections ==
=== District Council elections ===
Election	Number of popular votes	% of popular votes	Total elected seats	+/−
2019	2,969	0.09	1 / 452	1▲

== Leadership ==
=== Leaders ===
No.	Name	Portrait	Took office	Left office	Tenure length	Higher education
1	Jannelle Rosalynne Leung (1994– )		29 June 2019	Incumbent	7 years and 77 days	St. Mary's Canossian College; Hong Kong Polytechnic University (Master of Science in Accountancy)

== Representatives ==
=== District Councils ===
The Kwun Tong Future has won 1 seats in 1 District Councils (2020–2023):

District	Constituency	Member
Kwun Tong	Yuet Wah	Jannelle Rosalynne Leung
