= Fortress Hill (constituency) =

Hong Kong constituency

- Elected constituency for the Eastern District Council
- Boundary of Fortress Hill in Eastern District
- District: Eastern
- Legislative Council constituency: Hong Kong Island East
- Population: 15,987 (2019)
- Electorate: 9,127 (2019)

Current constituency
- Created: 1994
- Number of members: One
- Member: Vacant

Fortress Hill (Chinese: 炮台山) is one of the 35 constituencies in the Eastern District.

The constituency returns one district councillor to the Eastern District Council, with an election every four years. Fortress Hill has estimated population of 15,987.

== Councillors represented ==
Election	Member	Party	%
1994	Lam Cheuk-pan	Independent	70.49
1999	Frankie Lo Wing-kwan	Independent	45.33
2003	Frankie Lo Wing-kwan	Independent	50.05
2007	Frankie Lo Wing-kwan	Independent	58.48
2011	Frankie Lo Wing-kwan	Independent	N/A
2015	Frankie Lo Wing-kwan	Independent	N/A
2019	Jason Chan Ka-yau→Vacant (Note: Resigned on 31 May 2021 over new oath-taking law.)	Independent	57.72

== Election results ==
=== 2010s ===
Eastern District Council Election, 2019: Fortress Hill
Party	Candidate	Votes	%	±%
Nonpartisan	Jason Chan Ka-yau	3,596	57.72	
Nonpartisan	Frankie Lo Wing-kwan	2,634	42.28	
Majority		962	15.44	
Turnout		6,255	68.55	
Nonpartisan gain from Nonpartisan		Swing		

Eastern District Council Election, 2015: Fortress Hill
Party	Candidate	Votes	%	±%
Independent	Frankie Lo Wing-kwan	Unopposed		
Independent hold		Swing		

Eastern District Council Election, 2011: Fortress Hill
Party	Candidate	Votes	%	±%
Independent	Frankie Lo Wing-kwan	Unopposed		
Independent hold		Swing		

=== 2000s ===
Eastern District Council Election, 2007: Fortress Hill
Party	Candidate	Votes	%	±%
Independent	Frankie Lo Wing-kwan	1,698	58.48	+8.43
Civic	Lui Shuk-sui	1,199	37.12	+4.40
Majority		499	21.36	
Independent hold		Swing		

Eastern District Council Election, 2003: Fortress Hill
Party	Candidate	Votes	%	±%
Independent	Frankie Lo Wing-kwan	1,385	50.05	+5.38
Independent	Lui Shuk-sui	1,027	37.12	
Independent	Li Kin-leung	230	8.31	
Independent	Choi Wing-chung	125	4.52	
Independent hold		Swing		

=== 1990s ===
Eastern District Council Election, 1999: Fortress Hill
Party	Candidate	Votes	%	±%
Independent	Frankie Lo Wing-kwan	897	45.33	
Independent	Wong Kwai-lam	745	37.65	
CLDP	Shing Wai-pong	337	17.03	
Majority		152	7.68	
Independent gain from Independent		Swing		

Eastern District Board Election, 1994: Fortress Hill
Party	Candidate	Votes	%	±%
Independent	Lam Cheuk-pan	1,168	70.49	
LDF	Cheung Kwok-pan	289	17.44	
Liberal	Ho Wai-ming	200	12.07	
Majority		879	53.05	
Independent win (new seat)				
