= Ting On (constituency) =

Hong Kong constituency

- Elected constituency for the Kwun Tong District Council
- Boundary of Ting On in Kwun Tong District
- District: Kwun Tong
- Legislative Council constituency: Kowloon East
- Population: 16,809 (2019)
- Electorate: 9,202 (2019)

Current constituency
- Created: 1991
- Number of members: One
- Member: Wong Kai-ming (Democratic)

Ting On (Chinese: 定安) is one of the 40 constituencies in the Kwun Tong District of Hong Kong which was created in 1994 and currently held by nonpartisan Kam Kin.

The constituency loosely covers Kwun Tong Garden Estate and Lotus Tower in Ngau Tau Kok with the estimated population of 16,809.

== Councillors represented ==
Election	Member	Party
1991	Steven Hung Chung-fun	United Democrats
1994	Steven Hung Chung-fun	Democratic
1994	Wong Kai-ming	Democratic
2015	Kam Kin	Nonpartisan
2019	Wong Kai-ming	Democratic

== Election results ==
=== 2010s ===
Kwun Tong District Council Election, 2019: Ting On
Party	Candidate	Votes	%	±%
Democratic	Wong Kai-ming	3,522	56.14	+6.87
Nonpartisan	Kam Kin	2,752	43.86	−6.87
Majority		770	12.28	
Turnout		6,306	68.57	
Democratic gain from Nonpartisan		Swing		

Kwun Tong District Council Election, 2015: Ting On
Party	Candidate	Votes	%	±%
Nonpartisan	Kam Kin	2,159	50.73	+10.36
Democratic	Wong Kai-ming	2,097	49.27	−10.36
Majority		62	1.46	
Turnout		4,256	47.62	
Nonpartisan gain from Democratic		Swing	+10.36	

Kwun Tong District Council Election, 2011: Ting On
Party	Candidate	Votes	%	±%
Democratic	Wong Kai-ming	2,419	59.63	−0.45
Nonpartisan	Kam Kin	1,638	40.37	
Majority		781	19.26	
Turnout		4,057	42.18	
Democratic hold		Swing		

=== 2000s ===
Kwun Tong District Council Election, 2007: Ting On
Party	Candidate	Votes	%	±%
Democratic	Wong Kai-ming	2,133	60.08	+3.07
Independent	Shi Kai-pong	1,417	39.92	
Majority		716	20.15	
Democratic hold		Swing		

Kwun Tong District Council Election, 2003: Ting On
Party	Candidate	Votes	%	±%
Democratic	Wong Kai-ming	2,656	57.01	
Independent	Shi Kai-biu	2,003	42.99	
Majority		653	14.02	
Democratic hold		Swing		

=== 1990s ===
Kwun Tong District Council Election, 1999: Ting On
Party	Candidate	Votes	%	±%
Democratic	Wong Kai-ming	uncontested		
Democratic hold		Swing		

Kwun Tong District Board Election, 1994: Ting On
Party	Candidate	Votes	%	±%
Democratic	Wong Kai-ming	2,208	78.83	+1.17
123DA	Ip Kai	593	21.16	
Majority		1,615	57.67	
Democratic hold		Swing		

Kwun Tong District Board Election, 1991: Ting On
Party	Candidate	Votes	%	±%
United Democrats	Steven Hung Chung-fun	2,103	77.66	
Nonpartisan	Au Kai-wing	605	22.34	
Majority		1,498	55.32	
United Democrats win (new seat)				
