= Ka Wai (constituency) =

Constituency in Hong Kong

- 家維
- Elected constituency for the Kowloon City District Council
- Boundary of Ka Wai in Kowloon City District
- District: Kowloon City
- Legislative Council constituency: Kowloon Central
- Population: 19,876 (2019)
- Electorate: 11,397 (2019)

Current constituency
- Created: 1991
- Number of members: One
- Member: Vacant

Ka Wai (Chinese: 家維) is one of the 25 constituencies in the Kowloon City District of Hong Kong which was created in 1991.

The constituency has an estimated population of 19,301.

== Councillors represented ==
Election	Member	Party
1994	Chan Noi-yue	LDF
199?	Chan Noi-yue	Liberal
1999	Lau Ting-pong	Democratic
2007	Lo Chiu-kit	Independent
2019	Chau Hei-man→Vacant (Note: Resigned on 11 July 2021.)	Democratic

== Election results ==
=== 2010s ===
Kowloon City District Council Election, 2019: Ka Wai
Party	Candidate	Votes	%	±%
Democratic	Chau Hei-man	4,115	51.81	
Nonpartisan	Lo Chiu-kit	3,769	47.46	
Nonpartisan	Li Chun-lung	58	0.73	
Majority		346	4.35	
Turnout		7,979	70.02	
Democratic gain from Nonpartisan		Swing		
