= Castle Road (constituency) =

- Former elected constituency for the Central & Western District Council
- Boundary of Castle Road in Central & Western District
- District: Central & Western
- Legislative Council constituency: Hong Kong Island West
- Population: 20,397 (2019)
- Electorate: 7,560 (2019)

Former constituency
- Created: 1994
- Abolished: 2023
- Number of members: One
- Created from: Mid Levels East

Castle Road (Chinese: 衛城) was one of the 15 constituencies of the Central and Western District Council, returned one district councillor to the Central and Western District Council. The constituency was established in 1994 and abolished in 2023, during which was represented by Cheng Lai-king of the Democratic Party until her resignation in 2021.

The boundary loosely covers the Mid-levels area with estimated population of 20,397.

== Councillors represented ==
Election	Member	Party	%
1994	Cheng Lai-king→Vacant (Note: Resigned on 8 July 2021 over new oath-taking law.)	Democratic	66.54
1999	Cheng Lai-king→Vacant	Democratic	71.61
2003	Cheng Lai-king→Vacant	Democratic	73.56
2007	Cheng Lai-king→Vacant	Democratic	71.88
2011	Cheng Lai-king→Vacant	Democratic	59.45
2015	Cheng Lai-king→Vacant	Democratic	52.64
2019	Cheng Lai-king→Vacant	Democratic	51.05

== Election results ==
=== 2010s ===
Central & Western Council Election, 2019: Castle Road
Party	Candidate	Votes	%	±%
Democratic	Cheng Lai-king	2,669	51.05	−1.65
Liberal	Karl Fung Kar-leung	2,559	48.95	+1.65
Majority		110	1.10	
Turnout		5,250	69.45	
Democratic hold		Swing		

Central & Western Council Election, 2015: Castle Road
Party	Candidate	Votes	%	±%
Democratic	Cheng Lai-king	1,457	52.6	–6.8
Liberal	Ng lung-fei	1,311	47.4	
Majority		146	5.2	–13.6
Turnout		2,805	41.0	
Democratic hold		Swing		

Central & Western Council Election, 2011: Castle Road
Party	Candidate	Votes	%	±%
Democratic	Cheng Lai-king	1,291	59.4	−12.5
Independent	Pak Fu-hung	881	40.6	N/A
Majority		410	18.8	−25.0
Democratic hold		Swing		

=== 2000s ===
Central & Western Council Election, 2007: Castle Road
Party	Candidate	Votes	%	±%
Democratic	Cheng Lai-king	1,388	71.9	−1.7
New Forum	Welson Wu Wing-kuen	543	28.1	N/A
Majority		845	43.8	−3.4
Democratic hold		Swing		

Central & Western Council Election, 2003: Castle Road
Party	Candidate	Votes	%	±%
Democratic	Cheng Lai-king	1,625	73.6	+2.0
Independent	Chong Wai-por	584	26.4	N/A
Majority		1,041	47.2	+4.0
Democratic hold		Swing		

=== 1990s ===
Central & Western Council Election, 1999: Castle Road
Party	Candidate	Votes	%	±%
Democratic	Cheng Lai-king	1,014	71.6	+5.1
DAB	So Lai-sin	402	28.4	N/A
Majority		612	43.2	+10.2
Democratic hold		Swing		

Central & Western Council Election, 1994: Castle Road
Party	Candidate	Votes	%	±%
Democratic	Cheng Lai-king	1,058	66.5	N/A
DAB	So Lai-sin	532	33.5	N/A
Majority		526	30.0	N/A
Democratic win (new seat)				
