= Discovery Bay (constituency) =

- Elected constituency for the Islands District Council
- Boundary of Discovery Bay in Islands District
- District: Islands
- Legislative Council constituency: Hong Kong Island West
- Population: 20,016 (2019)
- Electorate: 5,228 (2019)

Current constituency
- Created: 1991
- Number of members: One
- Member: vacant

Discovery Bay (Chinese: 愉景灣) is one of the 10 constituencies in the Islands District in Hong Kong.

The constituency returns one district councillor to the Islands District Council, with an election every four years.

Discovery Bay constituency has an estimated population of 20,016.

== Councillors represented ==
Election	Member	Party
1991	Chan Chi-keung	Nonpartisan
1994	Ip Cho-yin	DAB
1999	Amy Yung Wing-sheung→vacant	Independent
2006	Amy Yung Wing-sheung→vacant	Civic

== Election results ==
=== 2010s ===
Islands District Council Election, 2019: Discovery Bay
Party	Candidate	Votes	%	±%
Civic (PfD)	Amy Yung Wing-sheung	2,072	64.67	
Nonpartisan	Jonathan Chow Yuen-kuk	1,132	35.33	
Majority		940	29.34	
Turnout		3,221	61.61	
Civic hold		Swing		
