= Kwan Po (constituency) =

Constituency of the Sai Kung District Council of Hong Kong

- Elected constituency for the Sai Kung District Council
- Boundary of Kwan Po in Sai Kung District
- District: Sai Kung
- Legislative Council constituency: New Territories South East
- Population: 13,854 (2019)
- Electorate: 6,769 (2019)

Current constituency
- Created: 2015
- Number of members: One
- Member: Vacant
- Created from: Fu Kwan

Kwan Po is one of the 27 constituencies in the Sai Kung District.

The constituency returns one district councillor to the Sai Kung District Council, with an election every four years.

Kwan Po constituency is loosely based on La Cite Noble and Tseung Kwan O Plaza in Tseung Kwan O with estimated population of 13,726.

== Councillors represented ==
Election	Member	Party
2015	Lai Ming-chak	Neo Democrats
2019	Lai Ming-chak→Vacant (Note: Resigned on 30 April 2021 over new oath-taking law.)	Neo Democrats

== china results ==
=== 2010s ===
Sai Kung District Council Election, 2019: Kwan Po
Party	Candidate	Votes	%	±%
Neo Democrats	Lai Ming-chak	3,346	62.40	
Nonpartisan	Li Ka-yan	2,016	37.60	
Majority		1,330	24.80	
Turnout		5,283	79.52	
Neo Democrats hold		Swing		
