= Cheung Wah (constituency) =

Constituency in the North District, Hong Kong

- Elected constituency for the North District Council
- Boundary of Cheung Wah in North District
- District: North
- Legislative Council constituency: New Territories East
- Population: 16,358 (2019)
- Electorate: 12,174 (2019)

Current constituency
- Created: 1991
- Number of members: One
- Member: vacant

Cheung Wah (Chinese: 祥華) is one of the 18 constituencies in the North District, Hong Kong.

The constituency returns one district councillor to the North District Council, with an election every four years.

Cheung Wah constituency has an estimated population of 16,358.

== Councillors represented ==
Election	Member	Party
1991	Leung Yuk-cheong	Meeting Point
1994	Leung Yuk-cheong	Democratic
1999	Wong Tsan-hung	DAB
2003	Mok Siu-lun	Democratic
2007	Chris Yip Yiu-shing	Nonpartisan
2015	Chan Yuk-ming→vacant	Democratic

== Election results ==
=== 2010s ===
North District Council Election, 2019: Cheung Wah
Party	Candidate	Votes	%	±%
Democratic	Chan Yuk-ming	4,446	52.28	
DAB	Lam Chi-yeung	2,678	31.49	
Nonpartisan	Wong ka-ho	1,381	16.24	
Majority		1,768	20.79	
Turnout		8,516	70.00	
Democratic hold		Swing		
