= Fung Wong (constituency) =

Constituency of Hong Kong

- Elected constituency for the Wong Tai Sin District Council
- Boundary of Fung Wong in Wong Tai Sin District
- District: Wong Tai Sin
- Legislative Council constituency: Kowloon Central
- Population: 14,838 (2019)
- Electorate: 6,552 (2019)

Current constituency
- Created: 1994
- Number of members: One
- Member: (Vacant)

Fung Wong
- Traditional Chinese: 鳳凰
Transcriptions
Yue: Cantonese
- Yale Romanization: Fuhng wòhng
- Jyutping: Fung6 wong4

Fung Wong is one of the 25 constituencies in the Wong Tai Sin District in Hong Kong. The constituency returns one district councillor to the Wong Tai Sin District Council, with an election every four years.

The constituency has an estimated population of 14,838.

== Councillors represented ==
Election	Member	Party
1994	Tam Kuen	Democratic
2003	Joe Chan Yim-kwong	Independent
2019	Tang Wai-keung→Vacant	Democratic

== Election results ==
=== 2010s ===
Wong Tai Sin District Council Election, 2019: Fung Wong
Party	Candidate	Votes	%	±%
Democratic	Tang Wai-keung	2,882	61.15	
Independent	Yeung Nok-hin	1,831	38.85	
Majority		1,051	22.30	
Turnout		4,733	72.27	
Democratic gain from Independent		Swing		
