= Siu Tsui (constituency) =

Hong Kong constituency

- 兆翠
- Elected constituency for the Tuen Mun District Council
- Boundary of Siu Tsui in Tuen Mun District
- District: Tuen Mun
- Legislative Council constituency: New Territories North West
- Population: 18,367 (2019)
- Electorate: 13,349 (2019)

Current constituency
- Created: 1999
- Number of members: One
- Member: Vacant

Siu Tsui (Chinese: 兆翠), formerly called Siu Lun, is one of the 31 constituencies in the Tuen Mun District.

Created for the 1999 District Council elections, the constituency returns one district councillor to the Tuen Mun District Council, with an election every four years.

Siu Tsui loosely covers areas surrounding The Sea Crest, Tsui Ning Garden and part of Siu Lun Court in Tuen Mun with an estimated population of 18,367.

== Councillors represented ==
Election	Member	Party
1999	Chan Kan-kam	Democratic
2003	Lo Hon-man	Democratic
2015	Yip Man-pan	DAB
2019	Yan Pui-lam→Vacant	TCHDNTW→Nonpartisan

== Election results ==
=== 2010s ===
Tuen Mun District Council Election, 2019: Siu Tsui
Party	Candidate	Votes	%	±%
PfD (Team Chu)	Yan Pui-lam	5,769	57.73	
DAB	Yip Man-pan	4,224	42.27	−11.22
Majority		1,545	15.46	
Turnout		10,048	75.29	
PfD gain from DAB		Swing		

Tuen Mun District Council Election, 2015: Siu Tsui
Party	Candidate	Votes	%	±%
DAB	Yip Man-pan	3,138	53.49	+17.65
Democratic	Tang Chun-to	2,536	43.23	−15.79
Independent	Ng Hon-ying	192	3.27	
Majority		602	10.26	
Turnout		5,866	46.91	
DAB gain from Democratic		Swing		

Tuen Mun District Council Election, 2011: Siu Tsui
Party	Candidate	Votes	%	±%
Democratic	Lo Hon-man	2,876	59.01	−6.98
DAB	Yip Man-pan	1,742	35.74	
People Power	Ho Wing-tung	256	5.25	
Majority		1,134	23.27	
Turnout		4,874	40.15	
Democratic hold		Swing		

=== 2000s ===
Tuen Mun District Council Election, 2007: Siu Tsui
Party	Candidate	Votes	%	±%
Democratic	Lo Hon-man	2,226	65.99	−4.93
Independent	Eric Li Wing-hang	896	26.56	
Independent	Bill Tong Man-pui	251	7.44	
Majority		1,330	39.43	
Democratic hold		Swing		

Tuen Mun District Council Election, 2003: Siu Tsui
Party	Candidate	Votes	%	±%
Democratic	Lo Hon-man	2,696	70.92	−0.02
DAB	Yu Sau-king	1,105	29.07	+0.02
Majority		1,591	40.45	
Democratic hold		Swing		

=== 1990s ===
Tuen Mun District Council Election, 1999: Siu Lun
Party	Candidate	Votes	%	±%
Democratic	Chan Kan-kam	2,188	70.95	
Independent	Yu Sau-king	896	29.05	
Majority		1,292	41.90	
Democratic win (new seat)				
