= King Yee (constituency) =

Hong Kong constituency

- 景怡
- Elected constituency for the Eastern District Council
- Boundary of King Yee in Eastern District
- District: Eastern
- Legislative Council constituency: Hong Kong Island East
- Population: 14,676 (2019)
- Electorate: 11,794 (2019)

Current constituency
- Created: 2003
- Number of members: One
- Member: Vacant

King Yee (Chinese: 景怡), formerly called Fu King, is one of the 35 constituencies in the Eastern District. The constituency returns one district councillor to the Eastern District Council, with an election every four years.

King Yee has estimated population of 14,676.

== Councillors represented ==
Election	Member	Party	%
2003	Chan Yiu-tak	Democratic	70.21
2007	David Leung Kwong-hung	DAB	50.34
2011	David Leung Kwong-hung	DAB→FTU	41.05
2015	David Leung Kwong-hung	FTU	42.33
2019	Tsang Yan-ying→Vacant (Note: Resigned on 31 May 2021 over new oath-taking law.)	Independent	57.14

== Election results ==
=== 2010s ===
Eastern District Council Election, 2019: King Yee
Party	Candidate	Votes	%	±%
Independent	Tsang Yan-ying	4,936	57.14	
FTU	David Leung Kwok-hung	3,079	35.64	−6.69
Nonpartisan	Yeung Hon-sing	623	7.21	
Majority		1,857	21.50	
Turnout		8,653	73.37	
Independent gain from FTU		Swing		

Eastern District Council Election, 2015: King Yee
Party	Candidate	Votes	%	±%
FTU	David Leung Kwok-hung	2,257	42.33	+1.28
Independent	Yeung Wai-hong	1,950	36.57	+14.16
Independent	Chan Yiu-tak	930	17.44	−19.10
Independent	Wong Kwan-fung	195	3.66	
Majority		307	5.76	
Turnout		5,332	47.67	
FTU hold		Swing		

Eastern District Council Election, 2011: King Yee
Party	Candidate	Votes	%	±%
DAB	David Leung Kwok-hung	2,140	41.05	−9.29
Democratic	Chan Yiu-tak	1,905	36.54	−13.12
Independent	Yeung Hon-sing	1,168	22.41	
Majority		235	4.51	
Turnout		4,403	39.80	
DAB hold		Swing		

=== 2000s ===
Eastern District Council Election, 2007: King Yee
Party	Candidate	Votes	%	±%
DAB	David Leung Kwok-hung	2,074	50.34	+20.55
Democratic	Chan Yiu-tak	2,046	49.66	−20.55
Majority		28	0.68	
DAB gain from Democratic		Swing	+20.55	

Eastern District Council Election, 2003: King Yee
Party	Candidate	Votes	%	±%
Democratic	Chan Yiu-tak	2,901	70.21	
DAB	Tong Wai-yuen	1,231	29.79	
Majority		1,670	40.42	
Democratic hold		Swing		
