= Tuen Mun Town Centre (constituency) =

Hong Kong constituency

- 屯門市中心
- Elected constituency for the Tuen Mun District Council
- Boundary of Tuen Mun Town Centre in Tuen Mun District
- District: Tuen Mun
- Legislative Council constituency: New Territories North West
- Population: 20,442 (2019)
- Electorate: 9,058 (2019)

Current constituency
- Created: 1994
- Number of members: One
- Member: Vacant

Tuen Mun Town Centre (Chinese: 屯門市中心) is one of the 31 constituencies in the Tuen Mun District.

Created for the 1994 District Board elections, the constituency returns one district councillor to the Tuen Mun District Council, with an election every four years.

Tuen Mun Town Centre loosely covers areas surrounding Tuen Mun Town Plaza in Tuen Mun with an estimated population of 20,442.

== Councillors represented ==
Election	Member	Party
1994	Au Chi-yuen	Independent
2019	Alfred Lai Chun-wing→Vacant	Democratic

== Election results ==
=== 2010s ===
Tuen Mun District Council Election, 2019: Tuen Mun Town Centre
Party	Candidate	Votes	%	±%
Democratic	Alfred Lai Chun-wing	4,161	63.19	+27.72
Nonpartisan	Au Chi-yuen	2,424	36.81	−27.72
Majority		1,737	26.38	
Turnout		6,617	73.06	
Democratic gain from Nonpartisan		Swing		

Tuen Mun District Council Election, 2015: Tuen Mun Town Centre
Party	Candidate	Votes	%	±%
Independent	Au Chi-yuen	1,517	64.53	+23.94
Democratic	Chiu Kam-moon	834	35.47	+8.78
Majority		683	29.06	
Turnout		2,351	29.96	
Independent hold		Swing		

Tuen Mun District Council Election, 2011: Tuen Mun Town Centre
Party	Candidate	Votes	%	±%
Independent	Au Chi-yuen	899	40.61	−15.36
Democratic	Chan Ka-kin	590	26.65	−3.30
NPP	Philip Yeung Man-tat	458	20.69	
Independent	Lau Ka-lun	267	12.06	
Majority		309	13.96	
Turnout		2,214	29.81	
Independent hold		Swing		

=== 2000s ===
Tuen Mun District Council Election, 2007: Tuen Mun Town Centre
Party	Candidate	Votes	%	±%
Independent	Au Chi-yuen	1,093	55.97	
Democratic	Ma Kee	585	29.95	
Independent	Kwan Chi-wah	200	10.24	
Independent	Alan Wong Shing	75	3.84	
Majority		1,318	26.02	
Independent hold		Swing		

Tuen Mun District Council Election, 2003: Tuen Mun Town Centre
Party	Candidate	Votes	%	±%
Independent	Au Chi-yuen	uncontested		
Independent hold		Swing		

=== 1990s ===
Tuen Mun District Council Election, 1999: Tuen Mun Town Centre
Party	Candidate	Votes	%	±%
Independent	Au Chi-yuen	1,354	66.77	+15.77
Independent	Lam Ping-hung	674	33.23	
Majority		111	33.54	
Independent hold		Swing		

Tuen Mun District Board Election, 1994: Tuen Mun Town Centre
Party	Candidate	Votes	%	±%
Independent	Au Chi-yuen	792	51.00	
Independent	Yuen Wai-chung	681	43.85	
Liberal	To Kai-chiu	80	5.15	
Majority		111	7.15	
Independent win (new seat)				
