= Yau Oi North (constituency) =

Hong Kong constituency

- 友愛北
- Elected constituency for the Tuen Mun District Council
- Boundary of Yau Oi North in Tuen Mun District
- District: Tuen Mun
- Legislative Council constituency: New Territories North West
- Population: 14,625 (2019)
- Electorate: 9,194 (2019)

Current constituency
- Created: 1994
- Number of members: One
- Member: Vacant

Yau Oi North (Chinese: 友愛北) is one of the 31 constituencies in the Tuen Mun District.

Created for the 1994 District Board elections, the constituency returns one district councillor to the Tuen Mun District Council, with an election every four years.

Yau Oi North loosely covers areas surrounding northern and western part of Yau Oi Estate in Tuen Mun with an estimated population of 14,625.

== Councillors represented ==
Election	Member	Party
1994	Chan Wan-sang	NTWRA
199?	Chan Wan-sang	DAB
2015	Tam Chun-yin	Labour
2019	Lam Ming-yan→Vacant	Labour

== Election results ==
=== 2010s ===
Tuen Mun District Council Election, 2019: Yau Oi North
Party	Candidate	Votes	%	±%
Labour	Lam Ming-yan	4,074	63.47	+13.14
DAB	Ip Chun-yuen	2,345	36.53	−10.46
Majority		1,729	26.94	
Turnout		6,435	73.37	
Labour hold		Swing		

Tuen Mun District Council Election, 2015: Yau Oi North
Party	Candidate	Votes	%	±%
Labour	Tam Chun-yin	1,731	50.33	
DAB	Chan Wan-sang	1,616	46.99	−21.77
Independent	Lam Lap	92	2.68	−28.56
Majority		115	3.34	
Turnout		3,439	43.64	
Labour gain from DAB		Swing		

Tuen Mun District Council Election, 2011: Yau Oi North
Party	Candidate	Votes	%	±%
DAB	Chan Wan-sang	1,785	68.76	+1.09
Democratic	Lam Lap	811	31.24	−1.09
Majority		974	37.52	
Turnout		2,596	33.07	
DAB hold		Swing		

=== 2000s ===
Tuen Mun District Council Election, 2007: Yau Oi North
Party	Candidate	Votes	%	±%
DAB	Chan Wan-sang	1,886	67.87	
Independent	Lam Lap	893	32.13	
Majority		993	35.74	
DAB hold		Swing		

Tuen Mun District Council Election, 2003: Yau Oi North
Party	Candidate	Votes	%	±%
DAB	Chan Wan-sang	Uncontested		
DAB hold		Swing		

=== 1990s ===
Tuen Mun District Council Election, 1999: Yau Oi North
Party	Candidate	Votes	%	±%
DAB	Chan Wan-sang	Uncontested		
DAB hold		Swing		

Tuen Mun District Board Election, 1994: Yau Oi North
Party	Candidate	Votes	%	±%
NTWRA	Chan Wan-sang	Uncontested		
Nonpartisan win (new seat)				
