= Tin Ping West (constituency) =

- Elected constituency for the North District Council
- Boundary of Tin Ping West in North District
- District: North
- Legislative Council constituency: New Territories North
- Population: 13,050 (2019)
- Electorate: 10,632 (2019)

Current constituency
- Created: 1988
- Number of members: One
- Member: vacant

Tin Ping West (Chinese: 天平西) is one of the 18 constituencies in the North District, Hong Kong.

The constituency returns one district councillor to the North District Council, with an election every four years.

Tin Ping West constituency has an estimated population of 13,050.

== Councillors represented ==
Election	Member	Party
1988	Wong Wing-kan	Meeting Point
1994	Wong Wing-kan	Democratic
1994	Au Wai-kwan	Nonpartisan
200?	Au Wai-kwan	Frontier
2007	Wong Wang-to	DAB
2012	Wong Wang-to	FTU
2019	Kwok Long-fung→Vacant	Democratic

== Election results ==
=== 2010s ===
North District Council Election, 2019: Tin Ping West
Party	Candidate	Votes	%	±%
Democratic	Kwok Long-fung	4,470	60.45	
FTU	Wong Wang-to	2,925	39.55	
Majority		1,545	20.90	
Turnout		7,420	69.81	
Democratic gain from FTU		Swing		
