= Cheung Ching (constituency) =

Hong Kong constituency

- Elected constituency for the Kwai Tsing District Council
- Boundary of Cheung Ching in Kwai Tsing District
- District: Kwai Tsing
- Legislative Council constituency: New Territories South West
- Population: 19,684 (2019)
- Electorate: 11,904 (2019)

Current constituency
- Created: 1994
- Number of members: One
- Member: vacant

Cheung Ching (Chinese: 長青) is one of the 31 constituencies of the Kwai Tsing District, returning one member to the Kwai Tsing District Council every four years. It was first created in 1994.

Loosely based on part of Cheung Ching Estate and Ching Chun Court in Tsing Yi, the constituency has an estimated population of 19,684 as of 2019.

== Councillors represented ==
Election	Member	Party
1994	Alan Lee Chi-keung	Nonpartisan
201?	Alan Lee Chi-keung	BPA
2019	Hon Chun-yin, Nicholas→vacant	Democratic

== Election results ==
=== 2010s ===
Kwai Tsing District Council Election, 2019: Cheung Ching
Party	Candidate	Votes	%	±%
Democratic (PfD)	Hon Chun-yin, Nicholas	4,575	57.57	+29.26
BPA	Alan Lee Chi-keung	3,372	42.43	−29.26
Majority		1,203	15.14	
Turnout		7,970	67.00	
Democratic gain from BPA		Swing		

Kwai Tsing District Council Election, 2015: Cheung Ching
Party	Candidate	Votes	%	±%
BPA	Alan Lee Chi-keung	3,223	71.69	+7.35
Democratic	Wong Kwong-mo	1,273	28.31	
Majority		1,950	43.38	
Turnout		4,496	42.65	
BPA hold		Swing		

Kwai Tsing District Council Election, 2011: Cheung Ching
Party	Candidate	Votes	%	±%
Independent	Alan Lee Chi-keung	2,616	64.34	
Independent	Ting Yin-wah	1,450	35.66	
Majority		1,166	28.68	
Turnout		4,066	36.71	
Independent hold		Swing		

=== 2000s ===
Kwai Tsing District Council Election, 2007: Cheung Ching
Party	Candidate	Votes	%	±%
Nonpartisan	Alan Lee Chi-keung	uncontested		
Nonpartisan hold		Swing		

Kwai Tsing District Council Election, 2003: Cheung Ching
Party	Candidate	Votes	%	±%
Nonpartisan	Alan Lee Chi-keung	uncontested		
Nonpartisan hold		Swing		

=== 1990s ===
Kwai Tsing District Council Election, 1999: Cheung Ching
Party	Candidate	Votes	%	±%
Nonpartisan	Alan Lee Chi-keung	2,438	75.27	+23.54
Democratic	Yiu Cheuk-wah	801	24.73	+1.26
Majority		1,637	50.54	
Nonpartisan hold		Swing		

Kwai Tsing District Board Election, 1994: Cheung Ching
Party	Candidate	Votes	%	±%
Nonpartisan	Alan Lee Chi-keung	1,466	51.73	
LDF	Lee Chi-fai	703	24.81	
Democratic	Tse Wai-ming	665	23.47	
Majority		763	26.92	
Nonpartisan win (new seat)				
