= Wan Tsui (constituency) =

Constituency of the Eastern District, Hong Kong

- 環翠
- Elected constituency for the Eastern District Council
- Boundary of Wan Tsui in Eastern District
- District: Eastern
- Legislative Council constituency: Hong Kong Island East
- Population: 15,594 (2019)
- Electorate: 9,207 (2019)

Current constituency
- Created: 1994
- Number of members: One
- Member: Vacant

Wan Tsui (Chinese: 環翠) is one of the 35 constituencies in the Eastern District.

The constituency returns one district councillor to the Eastern District Council, with an election every four years. The seat was last held by Ng Cheuk-ip.

Wan Tsui has estimated population of 15,594.

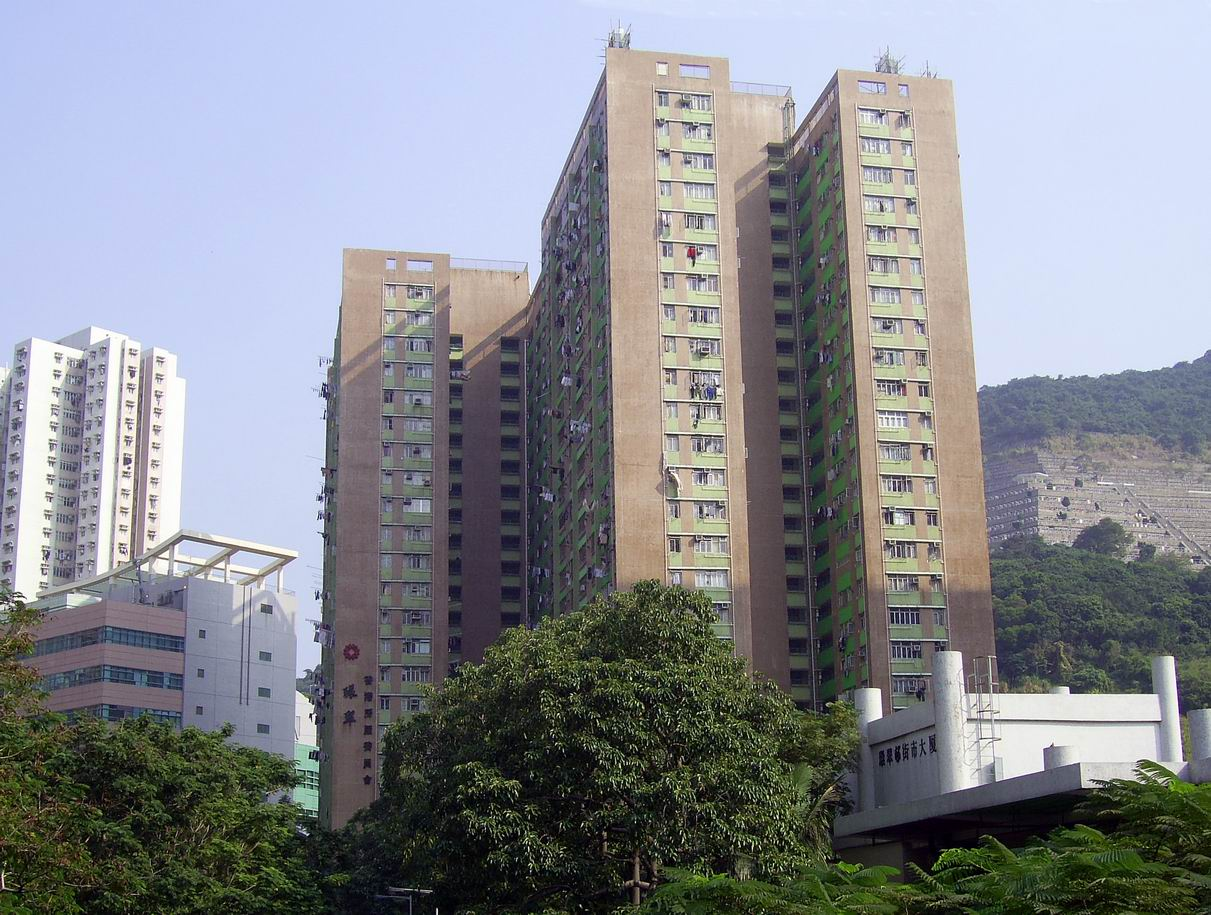
Wan Tsui Estate

== Councillors represented ==
Election	Member	Party	%
1994	Kung Pak-cheung	DAB	54.49
1999	Kung Pak-cheung	DAB	76.30
2003	Kung Pak-cheung	DAB	N/A
2007	Kung Pak-cheung	DAB	63.48
2011	Kung Pak-cheung	DAB	N/A
2015	Kung Pak-cheung	DAB	60.80
2019	Ng Cheuk-ip→Vacant (Note: Resigned on 8 July 2021.)	Independent democrat	54.01

== Election results ==
=== 2010s ===
Eastern District Council Election, 2019: Wan Tsui
Party	Candidate	Votes	%	±%
Ind. democrat	Ng Cheuk-ip	3,412	54.01	
DAB	Kung Pak-cheung	2,866	45.37	−15.43
Nonpartisan	Wong Kam-yin	39	0.62	
Majority		546	8.46	
Turnout		6,342	68.93	
Ind. democrat gain from DAB		Swing		

Eastern District Council Election, 2015: Wan Tsui
Party	Candidate	Votes	%	±%
DAB	Kung Pak-cheung	2,227	60.80	
Civic	Chow Wing-yee	1,436	39.20	
Majority		791	21.60	
Turnout		3,663	43.39	
DAB hold		Swing		

Eastern District Council Election, 2011: Wan Tsui
Party	Candidate	Votes	%	±%
DAB	Kung Pak-cheung	uncontested		
DAB hold		Swing		

=== 2000s ===
Eastern District Council Election, 2007: Wan Tsui
Party	Candidate	Votes	%	±%
DAB	Kung Pak-cheung	2,335	63.48	
Independent	Ng King-wah	1,231	34.52	
Majority		1,104	28.96	
DAB hold		Swing		

Eastern District Council Election, 2003: Wan Tsui
Party	Candidate	Votes	%	±%
DAB	Kung Pak-cheung	uncontested		
DAB hold		Swing		

=== 1990s ===
Eastern District Council Election, 1999: Wan Tsui
Party	Candidate	Votes	%	±%
DAB	Kung Pak-cheung	2,782	76.30	+21.81
Democratic	Yeung Kin-tak	864	23.70	
Majority		1,918	52.60	
DAB hold		Swing		

Eastern District Board Election, 1994: Wan Tsui
Party	Candidate	Votes	%	±%
DAB	Kung Pak-cheung	1,488	54.49	
Liberal	Cheung Hon-ting	675	24.72	
Independent	Ka Ting-pong	568	20.80	
Majority		813	29.77	
DAB win (new seat)				
