= Wah Fu South (constituency) =

- Elected constituency for the Southern District Council
- Boundary of Wah Fu South in Southern District
- District: Southern
- Legislative Council constituency: Hong Kong Island West
- Population: 12,937 (2019)
- Electorate: 8,346 (2019)

Current constituency
- Created: 1994
- Number of members: One
- Member: Vacant

Wah Fu South, formerly called Wah Fu I is one of the 17 constituencies in the Southern District, Hong Kong.

The constituency returns one district councillor to the Southern District Council, with an election every four years. The seat was last held by Li Shee-lin from Democratic Party.

The Wah Fu South constituency is loosely based on southwestern part of the Wah Fu Estate in Pokfulam with estimated population of 12,429.

== Councillors represented ==
Election	Member	Party
1994	Monita Wong King-fong	Democratic
2003	Au Lap-sing	Nonpartisan
2019	Becky Li Shee-lin→Vacant (Note: Resigned on 9 July 2021.)	Democratic

== Election results ==
=== 2010s ===
Southern District Council Election, 2019: Wah Fu South
Party	Candidate	Votes	%	±%
Democratic	Becky Li Shee-lin	3,121	55.74	+5.74
DAB (FTU)	Sunny Wong Choi-lap	2,478	44.26	
Majority		643	11.48	
Turnout		5,627	67.48	
Democratic gain from DAB		Swing		

Southern District Council Election, 2015: Wah Fu South
Party	Candidate	Votes	%	±%
Nonpartisan	Au Lap-sing	1,632	50.0	–7.5
Democratic	Becky Li Shee-lin	1,629	50.0	+9.8
Majority		3	0.0	–17.3
Turnout		3,284	43.4	
Nonpartisan hold		Swing	–8.7	

Southern District Council Election, 2011: Wah Fu I
Party	Candidate	Votes	%	±%
Nonpartisan	Au Lap-sing	1,723	57.5	
Democratic	Becky Li Shee-lin	1,204	40.2	
Independent	Wong Wing-lit	69	2.3	
Majority		519	17.3	
Nonpartisan hold		Swing		

=== 2000s ===
Southern District Council Election, 2007: Wah Fu I
Party	Candidate	Votes	%	±%
Nonpartisan	Au Lap-sing	uncontested		
Nonpartisan hold		Swing		

Southern District Council Election, 2003: Wah Fu I
Party	Candidate	Votes	%	±%
Nonpartisan	Au Lap-sing	1,903	55.7	+7.5
Democratic	Hopman Sin Wai-choi	1,512	44.3	–7.1
Majority		391	11.4	+8.2
Nonpartisan gain from Democratic		Swing	+7.3	

=== 1990s ===
Southern District Council Election, 1999: Wah Fu I
Party	Candidate	Votes	%	±%
Democratic	Monita Wong King-fong	1,438	51.4	–9.0
Nonpartisan	Au Lap-sing	1,349	48.2	
Majority		89	3.2	–18.8
Democratic hold		Swing		

Southern District Board Election, 1994: Wah Fu I
Party	Candidate	Votes	%	±%
Democratic	Monita Wong King-fong	1,973	60.4	
DAB	Chan Fu-chung	1,254	38.4	
Majority		719	22.0	
Democratic win (new seat)				
