= To Tai (constituency) =

Hong Kong constituency

- 淘大
- Elected constituency for the Kwun Tong District Council
- Boundary of To Tai in Kwun Tong District
- District: Kwun Tong
- Legislative Council constituency: Kowloon East
- Population: 17,071 (2019)
- Electorate: 8,712 (2019)

Current constituency
- Created: 1994
- Number of members: One
- Member: Lee Kwan-chak (Independent)

To Tai
- Traditional Chinese: 淘大
Transcriptions
Yue: Cantonese
- Yale Romanization: Tòuh daaih
- Jyutping: Tou4 daai6

To Tai is one of the 40 constituencies in the Kwun Tong District of Hong Kong which was created in 1994.

The constituency has an estimated population of 17,071.

== Councillors represented ==
Election	Member	Party
1994	Yip Hing-kwok	Independent
1999	Yip Hing-kwok	Independent
2003	Yip Hing-kwok	Independent
2007	Yip Hing-kwok	Independent
2011	Yip Hing-kwok	Independent
2015	Yip Hing-kwok	Independent
2019	Lee Kwan-chak	Civic→Independent

== Election results ==
=== 2010s ===
Kwun Tong District Council Election, 2019: To Tai
Party	Candidate	Votes	%	±%
Civic	Lee Kwan-chak	3,940	62.16	
Independent	Yip Hing-kwok	2,398	37.84	
Majority		1,542	24.32	
Turnout		6,364	73.05	
Civic gain from Independent		Swing		
