= Prime View (constituency) =

Constituency in Hong Kong

- 景峰
- Elected constituency for the Tuen Mun District Council
- Boundary of Prime View in Tuen Mun District
- District: Tuen Mun
- Legislative Council constituency: New Territories North West
- Population: 19,373 (2019)
- Electorate: 10,909 (2019)

Current constituency
- Created: 1994
- Number of members: One
- Member: Vacant

Prime View (Chinese: 景峰) is one of the 31 constituencies in the Tuen Mun District.

Created for the 1994 District Board elections, the constituency returns one district councillor to the Tuen Mun District Council, with an election every four years.

Prime View loosely covers areas surrounding Prime View Garden and Parkland Villas in Tuen Mun next to Siu Hong station with an estimated population of 19,373.

== Councillors represented ==
| Election | Member | Party |
|---|---|---|
| 1994 | Kwu Hon-keung | Independent |
| 1999 | Ho Hang-mui→Vacant | Democratic |

== Election results ==
=== 2010s ===
Tuen Mun District Council Election, 2019: Prime View
| Party | Candidate | Votes | % | ±% |
|---|---|---|---|---|
| Democratic | Ho Hang-mui | 5,534 | 67.63 | −4.88 |
| NPP | Kwong Man-tik | 2,649 | 32.37 | |
| Majority | | 2,885 | 35.26 | |
| Turnout | | 8,225 | 75.42 | |
| Democratic hold | | Swing | | |

Tuen Mun District Council Election, 2015: Prime View
| Party | Candidate | Votes | % | ±% |
|---|---|---|---|---|
| Democratic | Ho Hang-mui | 2,970 | 72.51 | −1.49 |
| Independent | Kwong Man-tik | 1,126 | 27.49 | |
| Majority | | 1,844 | 45.02 | |
| Turnout | | 4,096 | 42.02 | |
| Democratic hold | | Swing | | |

Tuen Mun District Council Election, 2011: Prime View
| Party | Candidate | Votes | % | ±% |
|---|---|---|---|---|
| Democratic | Ho Hang-mui | 2,732 | 74.00 | +2.71 |
| Liberal | Chui Kwan-ngai | 711 | 19.26 | |
| People Power | Raymond Lai | 249 | 6.74 | |
| Majority | | 2,021 | 54.74 | |
| Turnout | | 3,692 | 41.50 | |
| Democratic hold | | Swing | | |

=== 2000s ===
Tuen Mun District Council Election, 2007: Prime View
| Party | Candidate | Votes | % | ±% |
|---|---|---|---|---|
| Democratic | Ho Hang-mui | 2,031 | 71.29 | −3.80 |
| NTCC | Yeung Kong | 818 | 28.71 | |
| Majority | | 1,213 | 42.58 | |
| Democratic hold | | Swing | | |

Tuen Mun District Council Election, 2003: Prime View
| Party | Candidate | Votes | % | ±% |
|---|---|---|---|---|
| Democratic | Ho Hang-mui | 2,198 | 75.09 | +6.82 |
| DAB | Chan Ming | 729 | 24.91 | −6.82 |
| Majority | | 1,469 | 50.18 | |
| Democratic hold | | Swing | +6.82 | |

=== 1990s ===
Tuen Mun District Council Election, 1999: Prime View
| Party | Candidate | Votes | % | ±% |
|---|---|---|---|---|
| Democratic | Ho Hang-mui | 1,448 | 68.27 | |
| Independent | Chan Ming | 673 | 31.73 | |
| Majority | | 775 | 36.54 | |
| Democratic gain from Independent | | Swing | | |

Tuen Mun District Board Election, 1994: Prime View
| Party | Candidate | Votes | % | ±% |
|---|---|---|---|---|
| Independent | Kwu Hon-keung | uncontested | | |
| Independent win (new seat) | | | | |
