= Clague Garden (constituency) =

- Elected constituency for the Tsuen Wan District Council
- Boundary of Clague Garden in Tsuen Wan District
- District: Tsuen Wan
- Legislative Council constituency: New Territories South West
- Population: 17,170 (2019)
- Electorate: 7,959 (2019)

Current constituency
- Created: 1994
- Number of members: One
- Member: (Vacant)

Clague Garden (Chinese: 祈德尊) is one of the 19 constituencies in the Tsuen Wan District.

The constituency returns one district councillor to the Tsuen Wan District Council, with an election every four years.

Clague Garden constituency has estimated population of 17,170.

== Councillors represented ==
Election	Member	Party
1994	Chan Kam-lam	Independent
199?	Chan Kam-lam	Progressive Alliance
2005	Chan Kam-lam	DAB
2015	Koo Yeung-pong	DAB
2019	Chan Kim-kam→Vacant	Independent democrat

== Election results ==
=== 2010s ===
Tsuen Wan District Council Election, 2019: Clague Garden
Party	Candidate	Votes	%	±%
Democratic Coalition	Chan Kim-kam	2,797	50.61	
DAB	Koo Yeung-pong	2,730	49.39	
Majority		67	1.22	
Turnout		5,549	69.75	
Democratic Coalition gain from DAB		Swing		
