= Greenfield (constituency) =

Hong Kong constituency

- Elected constituency for the Kwai Tsing District Council
- Boundary of Greenfield in Kwai Tsing District
- District: Kwai Tsing
- Legislative Council constituency: New Territories South West
- Population: 18,232 (2019)
- Electorate: 10,660 (2019)

Current constituency
- Created: 1994
- Number of members: One
- Member: vacant

Greenfield (Chinese: 翠怡) is one of the 31 constituencies of the Kwai Tsing District Council in Hong Kong. The seat elects one member of the council every four years. It was first created in the 1994 elections. Its boundary is loosely based on Greenfield Garden in Tsing Yi with estimated population of 18,232.

== Councillors represented ==
Election	Member	Party
1994	Tsoi Pui-sum	Nonpartisan
1999	Law King-shing	Nonpartisan
2003	Angel Wong Suet-ying	Democratic
2011	Clarice Cheung Wai-ching	Nonpartisan
201?	Clarice Cheung Wai-ching	NPP
201?	Clarice Cheung Wai-ching	Nonpartisan
2019	Wong Chun-tat→vacant	Nonpartisan

== Election results ==
=== 2010s ===
Kwai Tsing District Council Election, 2019: Greenfield
Party	Candidate	Votes	%	±%
Nonpartisan	Wong Chun-tat	4,274	52.52	
Nonpartisan	Clarice Cheung Wai-ching	2,363	29.04	
Nonpartisan	Philip Tam Sai-wah	1,501	18.44	
Majority		1,911	23.48	
Turnout		7,952	70.94	
Nonpartisan gain from Nonpartisan		Swing		
