= Yau Oi South (constituency) =

Hong Kong constituency

- 友愛南
- Elected constituency for the Tuen Mun District Council
- Boundary of Yau Oi South in Tuen Mun District
- District: Tuen Mun
- Legislative Council constituency: New Territories North West
- Population: 15,078 (2019)
- Electorate: 9,194 (2019)

Current constituency
- Created: 1994
- Number of members: One
- Member: Lam Kin-cheung (Labour)

Yau Oi South (Chinese: 友愛南) is one of the 31 constituencies in the Tuen Mun District.

Created for the 1994 District Board elections, the constituency returns one district councillor to the Tuen Mun District Council, with an election every four years.

Yau Oi South loosely covers areas surrounding the southern part of Yau Oi Estate in Tuen Mun with an estimated population of 15,078.

== Councillors represented ==
Election	Member	Party
1994	Chiang Yuet-lan	Democratic
2011	Tsang Hin-hong	DAB
2019	Lam Kin-cheung→Vacant	Labour

== Election results ==
=== 2010s ===
Tuen Mun District Council Election, 2019: Yau Oi South
Party	Candidate	Votes	%	±%
Labour	Lam Kin-cheung	3,954	63.44	
DAB	Tsang Hin-hong	2,279	36.56	−29.80
Majority		1,675	26.88	
Turnout		6,247	68.02	
Labour gain from DAB		Swing		

Tuen Mun District Council Election, 2015: Yau Oi South
Party	Candidate	Votes	%	±%
DAB	Tsang Hin-hong	2,085	66.36	+8.82
People Power	Chin Po-fun	1,057	33.64	+24.86
Majority		1,028	32.72	
Turnout		3,142	37.65	
DAB hold		Swing		

Tuen Mun District Council Election, 2011: Yau Oi South
Party	Candidate	Votes	%	±%
DAB	Tsang Hin-hong	1,967	57.58	+8.83
Democratic	Chiang Yuet-lan	1,149	33.64	−17.61
People Power (Power Voters)	Carlos Lai Ka-long	300	8.78	
Majority		57	2.50	
Turnout		3,416	38.37	
DAB hold		Swing		

=== 2000s ===
Tuen Mun District Council Election, 2007: Yau Oi South
Party	Candidate	Votes	%	±%
Democratic	Chiang Yuet-lan	1,165	51.25	
DAB	Chan Kit-fong	1,108	48.75	
Majority		57	2.50	
Democratic hold		Swing		

Tuen Mun District Council Election, 2003: Yau Oi South
Party	Candidate	Votes	%	±%
Democratic	Chiang Yuet-lan	Uncontested		
Democratic hold		Swing		

=== 1990s ===
Tuen Mun District Council Election, 1999: Yau Oi South
Party	Candidate	Votes	%	±%
Democratic	Chiang Yuet-lan	Uncontested		
Democratic hold		Swing		

Tuen Mun District Board Election, 1994: Yau Oi South
Party	Candidate	Votes	%	±%
Democratic	Chiang Yuet-lan	1,419	65.54	
NTWRA	Ng Hak-keung	746	34.46	
Majority		673	31.08	
Democratic win (new seat)				
