= Centre Street (constituency) =

Former Hong Kong constituency

- Former Elected constituency for the Central & Western District Council
- Boundary of Centre Street in Central & Western District
- District: Central & Western
- Legislative Council constituency: Hong Kong Island West
- Population: 15,003 (2019)
- Electorate: 6,980 (2019)

Former constituency
- Created: 1999
- Abolished: 2023
- Number of members: One
- Created from: Tung Wah; University; Water Street

Centre Street was one of the 15 constituencies in the Central and Western District, Hong Kong.

It returned one member of the district council until it was abolished the 2023 electoral reforms.

Centre Street constituency was loosely based on the area around Centre Street in Sai Ying Pun with estimated population of 15,003.

== Councillors represented ==
| Election | Member | Party | % |
|---|---|---|---|
| 1999 | Henry Leung Yiu-cho | Democratic | 58.99 |
| 2003 | Henry Leung Yiu-cho | Democratic | 65.95 |
| 2006 by-election | Sidney Lee Chi-hang | Independent | 50.52 |
| 2007 | Sidney Lee Chi-hang | Independent | 64.98 |
| 2011 | Sidney Lee Chi-hang | Independent | 59.19 |
| 2015 | Sidney Lee Chi-hang | Independent | 50.50 |
| 2019 | Cheung Kai-yin→Vacant (Note: Resigned on 8 July 2021 over new oath-taking law.) | Democratic | 58.90 |

== Election results ==
=== 2010s ===
Central & Western District Council Election, 2019: Centre Street
| Party | Candidate | Votes | % | ±% |
|---|---|---|---|---|
| Democratic | Cheung Kai-yin | 2,909 | 58.90 | +9.40 |
| Nonpartisan | Sidney Lee Chi-hang | 2,030 | 41.10 | −9.40 |
| Majority | | 879 | 17.80 | |
| Turnout | | 4,954 | 70.98 | |
| Democratic gain from Nonpartisan | | Swing | | |

Central & Western District Council Election, 2015: Centre Street
| Party | Candidate | Votes | % | ±% |
|---|---|---|---|---|
| Nonpartisan | Sidney Lee Chi-hang | 1,654 | 50.5 | –9.3 |
| Democratic | Cheung Kai-yin | 1,621 | 49.5 | |
| Majority | | 33 | 1.0 | –17.4 |
| Turnout | | 3,322 | 50.1 | |
| Independent hold | | Swing | | |

Central & Western District Council Election, 2011: Centre Street
| Party | Candidate | Votes | % | ±% |
|---|---|---|---|---|
| Independent | Sidney Lee Chi-hang | 1,739 | 59.2 | −5.8 |
| Land Justice League | Wong Ho-yin | 1,199 | 40.8 | N/A |
| Majority | | 540 | 18.4 | −11.6 |
| Independent hold | | Swing | | |

=== 2000s ===
Central & Western District Council Election, 2007: Centre Street
| Party | Candidate | Votes | % | ±% |
|---|---|---|---|---|
| Independent | Sidney Lee Chi-hang | 2,013 | 65.0 | +15.3 |
| Independent | Victor Lee Kwok-chuen | 1,085 | 35.0 | N/A |
| Majority | | 928 | 30.0 | |
| Independent hold | | Swing | | |

Centre Street by-election 2006
| Party | Candidate | Votes | % | ±% |
|---|---|---|---|---|
| Independent (FTU) | Sidney Lee Chi-hang | 1,128 | 49.7 | |
| Democratic | Nelson Wong Kin-shing | 907 | 41.6 | −14.4 |
| Independent | Louis Leung Wing-on | 198 | 8.7 | N/A |
| Majority | | 221 | 8.1 | |
| Independent gain from Democratic | | Swing | | |

Central & Western District Council Election, 2003: Centre Street
| Party | Candidate | Votes | % | ±% |
|---|---|---|---|---|
| Democratic | Henry Leung Yiu-cho | 1,693 | 66.0 | +7.0 |
| DAB | Lau Yeung-fun | 750 | 29.2 | −11.8 |
| Independent | So Lai-yung | 124 | 24.8 | |
| Majority | | 943 | 36.8 | +18.8 |
| Democratic hold | | Swing | | |

=== 1990s ===
Central & Western District Council Election, 1999: Centre Street
| Party | Candidate | Votes | % | ±% |
|---|---|---|---|---|
| Democratic | Henry Leung Yiu-cho | 1,063 | 59.0 | N/A |
| DAB | Tong Wai-yuen | 739 | 41.0 | N/A |
| Majority | | 324 | 18.0 | (new) |
| Democratic win (new seat) | | | | |
