= Yuet Wah (constituency) =

Hong Kong constituency

- 月華
- Elected constituency for the Kwun Tong District Council
- Boundary of Yuet Wah in Kwun Tong District
- District: Kwun Tong
- Legislative Council constituency: Kowloon East
- Population: 13,320 (2019)
- Electorate: 7,719 (2019)

Current constituency
- Created: 1994
- Number of members: One
- Member: Vacant

Yuet Wah
- Traditional Chinese: 月華
Transcriptions
Yue: Cantonese
- Yale Romanization: Yuht wàah
- Jyutping: Jyut6 waa4

Yuet Wah is one of the 40 constituencies in the Kwun Tong District of Hong Kong which was created in 1994.

The constituency has an estimated population of 13,320.

== Councillors represented ==
Election	Member	Party
1994	Lai Wing-nin	Independent
2007	Tsui Hoi-shan	Independent
2019	Jannelle Rosalynne Leung→Vacant (Note: Resigned on 9 July 2021 over new oath-taking law.)	Independent

== Election results ==
=== 2010s ===
Kwun Tong District Council Election, 2019: Yuet Wah
Party	Candidate	Votes	%	±%
Nonpartisan	Jannelle Rosalynne Leung	2,969	53.73	
Independent	Hsu Hoi-shan	2,557	46.27	
Majority		412	7.46	
Turnout		5,540	71.79	
Nonpartisan gain from Independent		Swing		
