= Team Chu Hoi-dick of New Territories West =

Pro-democracy political group in Hong Kong

Team Chu Hoi-dick of New Territories West 朱凱廸新西團隊
- Convenor: Eddie Chu
- Founded: 2016
- Dissolved: 20 May 2021
- Ideology: Communalism; Direct democracy Environmentalism; Left-wing localism Liberalism (HK); New Territories West regionalism
- Political position: Centre-left to left-wing
- Regional affiliation: Pro-democracy camp
- Colours: Green

Team Chu Hoi-dick of New Territories West (Chinese: 朱凱廸新西團隊) was a pro-democracy political group based in New Territories West that existed between 2016 and 2021.

In the 2019 District Council election, nine people from the group ran and seven were elected, but the group's founder, Eddie Chu, lost. The team was asked by the Returning Officer for its position on "democratic self-determination" when applying for permission to run, and was determined to be eligible based on the answer.

On 30 July 2020, the government stated that group member Lester Shum was among a dozen pro-democracy candidates whose nominations were invalid. Shum's disqualification was determined by a process which assesses whether candidates object to the enactment of national security laws or are willing to disavow separatism.

The group supported the five demands and the implementation of universal suffrage for Legislative Council elections and for the election of the Chief Executive. In 2021, Eddie Chu announced its dissolution after he was arrested for breaching the Hong Kong national security law.

== Performance in elections ==
=== District Council elections ===
Election	Number of popular votes	% of popular votes	Total elected seats	+/−
2019	31,369	1.07	7 / 452	New
