= 1991 Hong Kong local elections =

- 3 March 1991

All Elected Constituencies 274 (of the 441) seats in all 18 Districts Boards
- Registered: 1,840,413 ▲14.24%
- Turnout: 423,923 (32.47%) ▲2.21pp
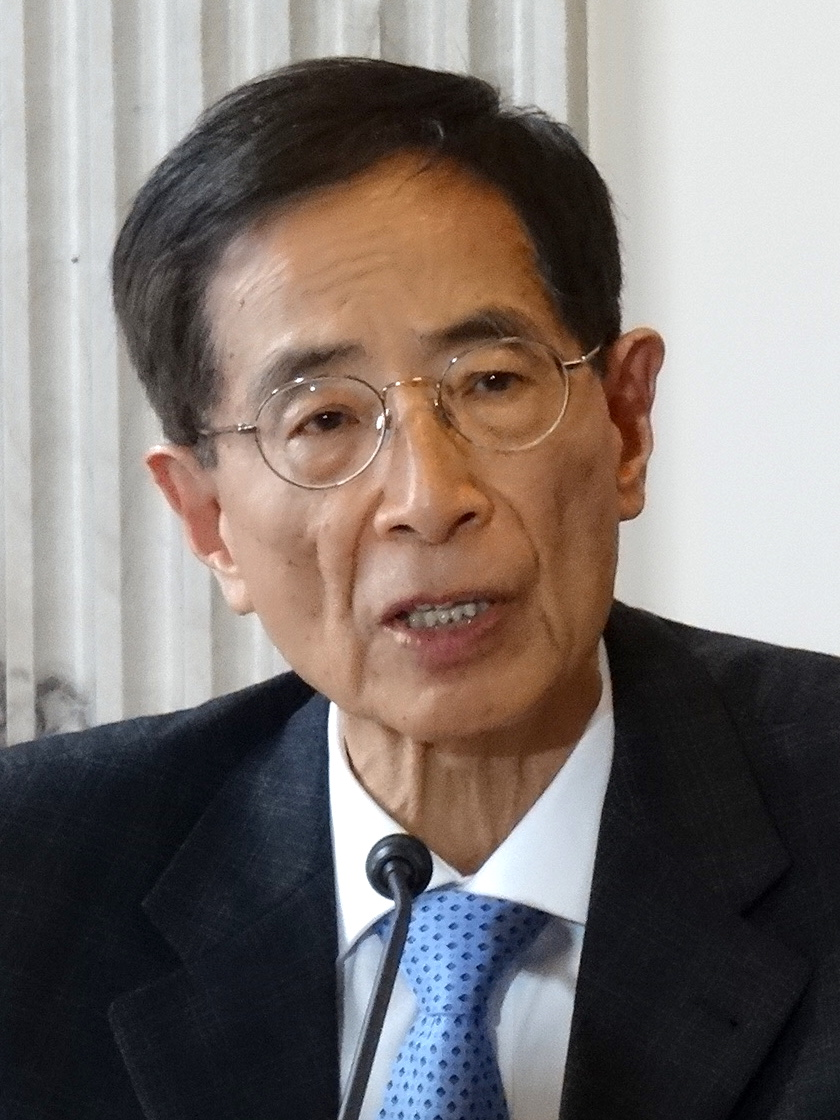

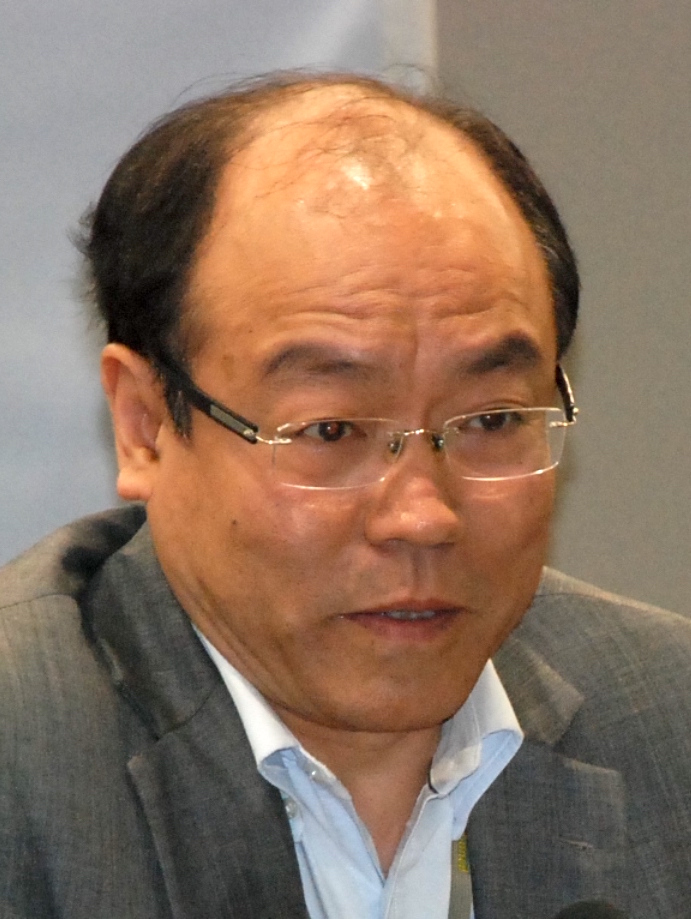

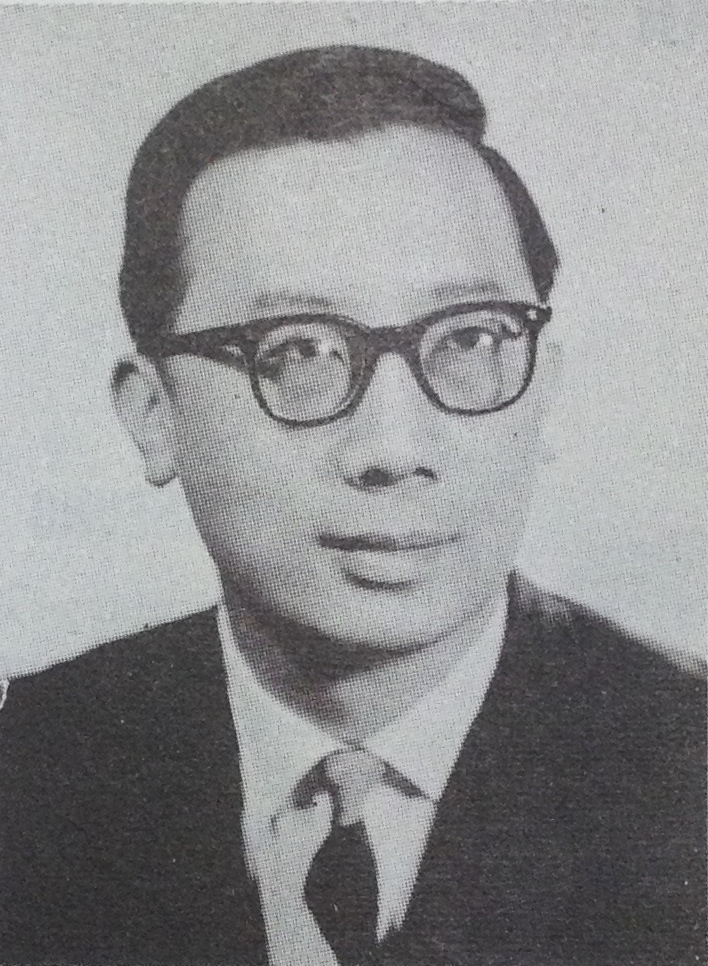

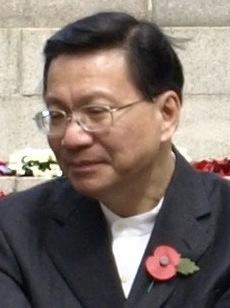

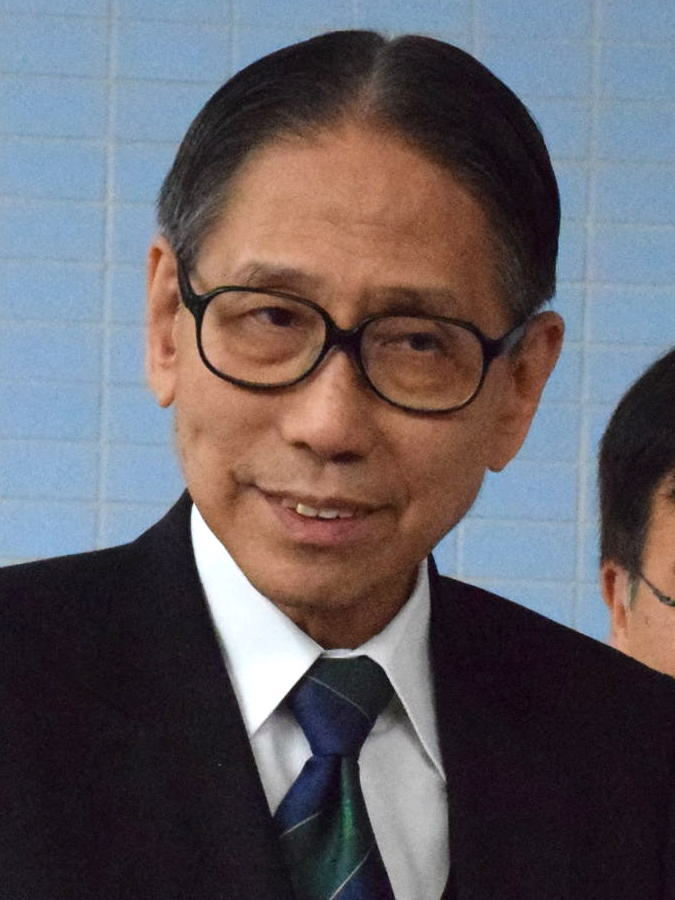
	First party	Second party	Third party
Leader	Martin Lee	Hu Fa-kuang	Frederick Fung
Party	United Democrats	LDF	ADPL
Last election	New party	New party	27 seats, 10.25%
Seats won	52	24	15
Seat change	▲19	▲10	▲3
Popular vote	109,747	47,633	27,979
Percentage	21.87%	8.96%	5.26%
Swing	N/A	N/A	▼4.99pp
	Fourth party	Fifth party	Sixth party
Leader	Hilton Cheong-Leen	Anthony Cheung	Lee Chark-tim
Party	Civic	Meeting Point	FTU
Last election	16 seats, 6.65%	16 seats, 6.57%	2 seats, 0.53%
Seats won	11	11	4
Seat change	▲3	▲2	▲2
Popular vote	24,760	18,386	6,229
Percentage	4.66%	3.46%	1.17%
Swing	▼1.99pp	▼3.11pp	▲0.64pp
	Seventh party	Eighth party	Ninth party
Leader	Leong Che-hung	Brook Bernacchi	Pang Chun-hoi
Party	HKDF	Reform	TUC
Last election	New party	2 seats, 1.50%	Did not contest
Seats won	3	1	1
Seat change	▲2	▼1	Steady
Popular vote	8,667	2,136	1,982
Percentage	1.63%	0.40%	0.37%
Swing	N/A	▼1.10%	N/A

The 1991 Hong Kong District Board elections were held on 3 March 1991. Elections were held in all 19 districts of Hong Kong for 274 members from directly elected constituencies, which counted for about two-thirds of the seats in the District Boards.

It was the first of the three-tier elections in 1991, followed by the May Urban and Regional Council elections and the September Legislative Council election in which direct elections would be introduced for the first time. In preparation for these elections, both the liberal pro-democracy and conservative pro-business forces formed political parties to the contest in the coming elections. The pro-democracy party United Democrats of Hong Kong (UDHK) formed as a grand alliance for the pro-democrats in April 1990, the more middle-class oriented Hong Kong Democratic Foundation (HKDF) formed in October 1989 and the pro-business conservative Liberal Democratic Federation of Hong Kong (LDF) formed in November 1990.

About 420,000 voters cast their votes, which counted for 32.5 per cent of the total electorate, higher than the 30.3 per cent of the previous 1988 elections but lower than the 38.9 per cent in the first District Board elections in 1982. 81 incumbents were elected without contest. 70 pre cent of the candidates were affiliated with political groups and public organisations. The newly established liberal United Democrats emerged as the biggest winner in the election, winning 56 seats out of 80 candidates which won evenly in each region. The conservative Liberal Democratic Federation claimed to have won 50 seats out of 89 candidates, although many of them ran as independents of whom only 35 openly acknowledged their LDF affiliation. Three of the seven candidates from the Democratic Foundation got elected, while the other pro-democracy groups, the Meeting Point won 11 out of 13 bids and the Association for Democracy and People's Livelihood (ADPL) got 14 out of 17 candidates elected.

Out of 30 pro-Beijing candidates who contested in the election, 24 of whom were elected, including each five candidates in Eastern District and Kwun Tong, eight candidates and eight other Beijing-friendly candidates in Kowloon Central. The pro-Beijing Hong Kong Federation of Trade Unions also fielded 16 candidates, of whom 12 were elected, despite most of them ran under their local affiliations and only three of them ran openly with FTU endorsement. The satisfying results encouraged the pro-China camp to field their own candidates in the coming Urban Council and Legislative Council elections.

After the elections, Governor David Wilson appointed 140 members to the District Boards.

== Results ==
=== General outcome ===
Overall Summary of the 3 March 1991 District Boards of Hong Kong election results
Political Affiliation	Popular vote	%	Standing	Elected
United Democrats of Hong Kong	109,747	20.64	75	52
Liberal Democratic Federation of Hong Kong	47,633	8.96	51	24
Hong Kong Association for Democracy and People's Livelihood	27,979	5.26	19	15
Hong Kong Civic Association	24,760	4.66	21	11
Meeting Point	18,386	3.46	13	11
Tsing Yi Concern Group	8,360	1.57	4	4
Hong Kong Federation of Trade Unions	6,229	1.17	4	4
Tuen Mun Forth Reviewers	9,161	1.72	4	3
Hong Kong Democratic Foundation	8,667	1.63	7	3
Neighbourhood and Worker's Service Centre	5,978	1.12	2	2
Kwun Tong Man Chung Friendship Promotion Association	2,231	0.42	2	2
October Review	2,382	0.45	1	1
Reform Club of Hong Kong	2,136	0.40	1	1
Hong Kong and Kowloon Trades Union Council	1,982	0.37	1	1
Hong Kong Citizen Forum	1,276	0.24	3	1
Independent and others	256,081	48.16	261	137
Total (turnout 32.47%)	531,712	100.0	467	272

Note: Some of the candidates with multiple affiliations are overlapped in this chart.

=== Vote summary ===
Popular vote
United Democrats	20.64%
LDF	8.96%
ADPL	5.26%
Civic	4.66%
Meeting Point	3.46%
DF	1.63%
FTU	1.17%
Others	54.22%

=== Seat summary ===
Seats
United Democrats	19.12%
LDF	8.82%
ADPL	5.51%
Civic	4.04%
Meeting Point	4.04%
FTU	1.47%
DF	1.10%
Others	55.90%
