= 1994 Hong Kong local elections =

- 18 September 1994

All Elected Constituencies 346 (of the 373) seats in all 18 Districts Boards
- Registered: 2,450,372 ▲33.14%
- Turnout: 693,215 (33.11%) ▲0.64pp
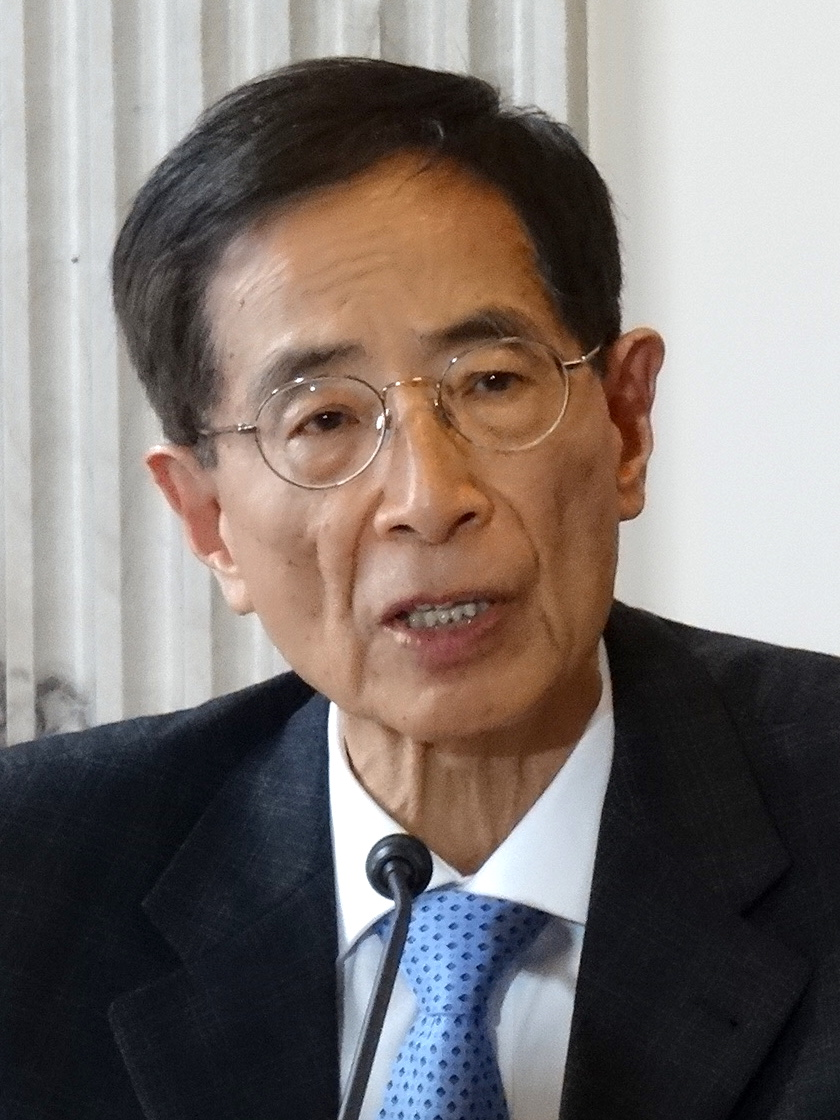

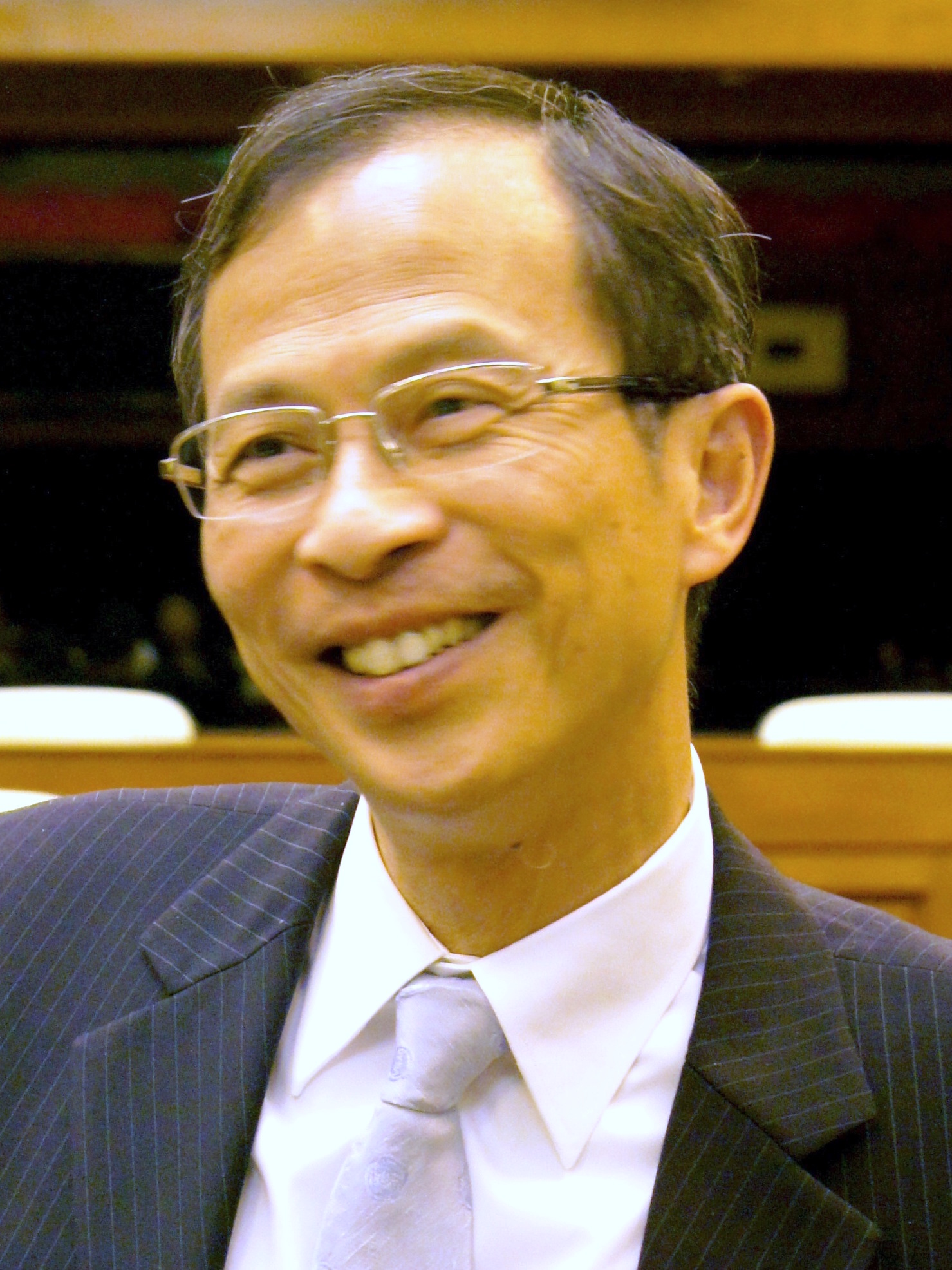

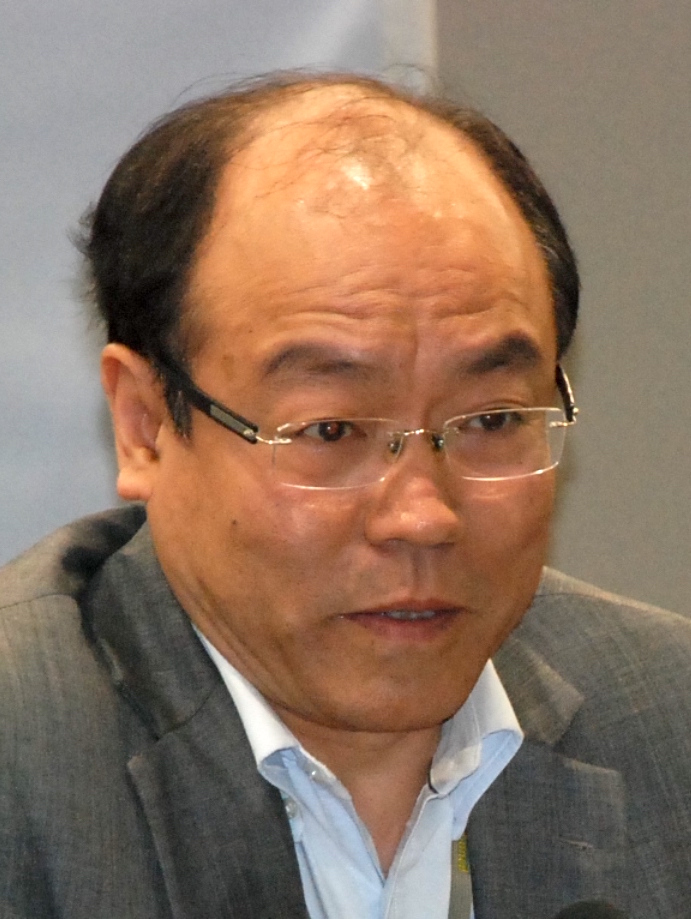

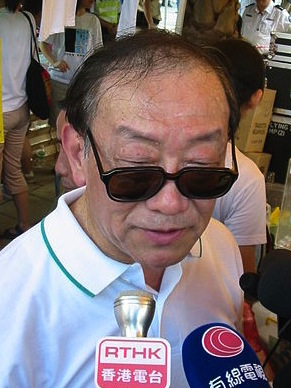

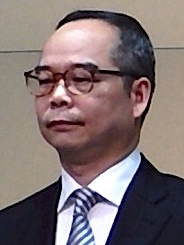
	First party	Second party	Third party
Leader	Martin Lee	Tsang Yok-sing	Frederick Fung
Party	UDHK/MP	DAB	ADPL
Last election	New party	New party	15 seats, 5.26%
Seats won	75	37	29
Seat change	▲26	▲12	▲12
Popular vote	157,929	81,126	47,731
Percentage	23.01%	11.82%	6.95%
Swing	N/A	N/A	▲2.20pp
	Fourth party	Fifth party	Sixth party
Leader	Allen Lee	Hu Fa-kuang	Lau Kong-wah
Party	Liberal	LDF	Civil Force
Last election	New party	24 seats, 8.96%	New party
Seats won	18	11	10
Seat change	▲6	▼5	▲7
Popular vote	50,755	25,499	12,141
Percentage	7.39%	3.72%	1.77%
Swing	N/A	▼5.24pp	N/A
	Seventh party	Eighth party	Ninth party
Leader	Yum Sin-ling	Patrick Shiu	Ambrose Lau
Party	123DA	HKDF	HKPA
Last election	New party	3 seats, 1.63%	New party
Seats won	6	3	1
Seat change	Steady	Steady	Steady
Popular vote	15,527	4,048	3,288
Percentage	2.26%	0.59%	0.48%
Swing	N/A	▼1.04pp	N/A

The 1994 Hong Kong District Board elections were held on 18 September 1994 for all 18 districts of Hong Kong and 346 members from directly elected constituencies. It was the last district-level elections in the colonial period before the handover of Hong Kong in 1997. It was the first elections to be held after the abolition of the appointed seats as proposed by the new electoral arrangements, as the last step of the democratisation by the then Governor Chris Patten before the handover.

Despite set against the British-Chinese dispute over Hong Kong's political reform, the election was influenced by local issues such as bus fares and garbage collection. The turnout of 33.1 per cent, slightly higher than the 32.5 per cent turnout for the 1991 District Board elections. Almost 700,000 votes cast were 60 per cent more than in the previous election and reflect the broader franchise stemming from Patten's reform package.

Under the Patten reform package, the voting age was lowered to 18 from 21, appointed members were abolished, and District Board members were given responsibility of filling ten of the 60 Legislative Council seats through Election Committee constituency in the 1995 Legislative Council election. The multiple-member single-constituency electoral method was also changed to single-member constituency method.

The pro-democracy alliance, the United Democrats–Meeting Point, which was undergoing the merger plan of creating the Democratic Party, captured the lead with 75 seats (77 seats in some other materials) and teamed up with smaller pro-democracy parties to gain control of five of the 18 District Boards, Central and Western District, Sham Shui Po District and Kwun Tong District in Hong Kong Island and Kowloon, and Tuen Mun District and Kwai Tsing District in the New Territories. The biggest pro-Beijing party, the Democratic Alliance for the Betterment of Hong Kong (DAB) won 37 seats, doing better than expected, while conservative, pro-business candidates of the Liberal Party, the Liberal Democratic Federation of Hong Kong (LDF) and the Hong Kong Progressive Alliance came in below expectations with 30 seats.

After the elections, Beijing appointed 200 District Affairs Advisers as the part of establishing a political structure parallel to that of the British one, as it claimed that Patten's reform violated the constitution and Sino-British agreements. After the handover, the 1994 elected District Boards transformed into 18 Provisional District Boards with the reintroduction of the appointed seats by Chief Executive Tung Chee-hwa. The Provisional District Boards were replaced by the District Councils elected in 1999.

== Results ==
=== General outcome ===
Overall Summary of the 18 September 1994 District Boards of Hong Kong election results
Political Affiliation	Popular vote	%	Standing	Elected	±
Democratic Alliance for the Betterment of Hong Kong	81,126	11.82	83	37	▲12
Liberal Party	50,755	7.39	89	18	▲6
Liberal Democratic Federation of Hong Kong	25,499	3.72	28	11	▼5
Civil Force	12,141	1.77	10	10	▲7
East Kowloon District Residents' Committee	9,197	1.34	11	8	0
Kwun Tong Man Chung Friendship Promotion Association	11,952	1.74	12	7	▲2
United Front for the Service of the People	9,720	1.42	8	4	Steady
Public Affairs Society	6,982	1.02	15	2	▼1
Kowloon City District Residence Association	1,486	0.22	2	2	-
Sham Shui Po Residents Association	332	0.05	3	2	-
Mongkok District Residence Association	1,450	0.21	2	1	-
Tai Po District Residence Association	3,325	0.48	4	1	-
Hong Kong Progressive Alliance	3,288	0.48	7	1	0
New Territories West Residents Association	2,187	0.32	5	1	▼1
Pro-China independents and others	151,436	22.08	162	90	
Total for pro-China and conservative parties and allies	371,455	54.12	442	196	▲23
United Democrats–Meeting Point	157,929	23.01	133	75	▲26
Hong Kong Association for Democracy and People's Livelihood	47,731	6.95	40	29	▲12
123 Democratic Alliance	15,527	2.26	20	6	0
Hong Kong Democratic Foundation	4,048	0.59	5	3	0
Kowloon City Observers	5,164	0.75	6	2	▲1
Hong Kong Public Doctors' Association	3,273	0.48	3	2	-
Hong Kong Confederation of Trade Unions	2,850	0.42	2	2	-
Hong Kong Professional Teachers' Union	2,127	0.31	1	1	-
Neighbourhood and Worker's Service Centre	859	0.13	3	1	▼1
Pioneer	387	0.06	1	0	-
Independent democrats and others	40,803	5.94	35	25	
Total for pro-democracy parties and allies	280,698	40.89	249	146	▲48
Total for others	34,255	4.99	66	4	▲2
Total (turnout 33.1%)	686,408	100.0	757	346	▲73

=== Results by district ===
District Board	Post-election control	Largest party	UD/MP	DAB	ADPL	LP	LDF	CF	123DA	Others	Pro-dem	Pro-Beijing	Ex officio	Composition	Details
Central & Western	Pro-democracy	UD/MP (majority)	8	2		1				3	9	5	—N/a		Details
Wan Chai	Pro-Beijing	United Democrats	3	3		1				3	3	7	—N/a		Details
Eastern	Pro-Beijing	DAB	4	9		3				18	10	22+2 Ind.	—N/a		Details
Southern	Pro-Beijing	UD/MP	5			2				10	4	11	—N/a		Details
Yau Tsim Mong	Pro-Beijing	ADPL	1	1	2		1		1	9	6	9	—N/a		Details
Sham Shui Po	Pro-democracy	ADPL (majority)	3		11	1				5	15	5	—N/a		Details
Kowloon City	Pro-Beijing	LDF	2	2		2	6		1	8	5	16	—N/a		Details
Wong Tai Sin	Pro-Beijing	United Democrats	4	4	3	1				10	8	14	—N/a		Details
Kwun Tong	Pro-democracy	UD/MP	7	4	1	1			2	18	17	16	—N/a		Details
Tsuen Wan	Pro-Beijing	UD/MP	2	1						12	6	9	2		Details
Tuen Mun	Pro-democracy	UD/MP	9	2	4		1		2	7	15	10	1		Details
Yuen Long	Pro-Beijing	UD/MP	3	1						15	3	16	6		Details
North	Pro-Beijing	DAB	2	4						5	3	8	4		Details
Tai Po	Pro-Beijing	United Democrats	4	2		4	3			4	4	13	2		Details
Sai Kung	Pro-Beijing	United Democrats	2		2					7	5	6	2		Details
Sha Tin	Pro-Beijing	Civil Force	8			2		10		11	12	19	1		Details
Kwai Tsing	Pro-democracy	UD/MP	9		6					11	23	3	1		Details
Islands	Pro-Beijing	DAB		2						4	0	6	8		Details
TOTAL			75	37	29	18	11	10	6	158	148	196+2 Ind.	27		

=== Vote summary ===
Popular vote
UDHK/MP	23.16%
DAB	11.82%
Liberal	7.39%
ADPL	6.95%
LDF	4.06%
123DA	2.26%
Civil Force	1.77%
Others	42.59%

=== Seat summary ===
Seats
UDHK/MP	22.25%
DAB	10.69%
ADPL	8.38%
Liberal	5.20%
LDF	3.76%
Civil Force	2.90%
123DA	1.73%
Others	45.09%
