= 2007 North District Council election =

2007 Hong Kong local election to the North District Council

| ← 2003 | 18 November 2007 | 2011 → |

16 (of the 25) seats to North District Council 13 seats needed for a majority
- Turnout: 39.6%
| | First party | Second party |
|---|---|---|
| Party | DAB | Democratic |
| Last election | 5 seats, 33.9% | 8 seats, 40.7% |
| Seats before | 5 | 8 |
| Seats won | 9 | 4 |
| Seat change | ▲4 | ▼4 |
| Popular vote | 26,644 | 15,975 |
| Percentage | 47.6% | 28.6% |
| Swing | ▲13.7% | ▼12.1% |
- Colours on map indicate winning party for each constituency.

The 2007 North District Council election was held on 18 November 2007 to elect all 16 elected members to the 25-member District Council.

== Overall election results ==
Before election:

↓
| 10 | 6 |
| Pro-democracy | Pro-Beijing |

Change in composition:

↓
| 5 | 11 |
| Pro-democracy | Pro-Beijing |

North Council election result 2007
| Party | Seats | Gains | Losses | Net gain/loss | Seats % | Votes % | Votes | +/− |
|---|---|---|---|---|---|---|---|---|
| DAB | 9 | 5 | 1 | +4 | 56.3 | 47.6 | 26,644 | +13.7 |
| Democratic | 4 | 1 | 5 | −4 | 15.0 | 28.6 | 15,975 | −12.1 |
| Independent | 3 | 2 | 1 | +1 | 18.8 | 15.2 | 8,530 | |
| Liberal | 0 | 0 | 0 | 0 | 0 | 1.9 | 1,045 | |
| Frontier | 0 | 0 | 1 | −1 | 0 | 1.6 | 877 | |
| Civic | 0 | 0 | 0 | 0 | 0 | 0.5 | 282 | |
