= Fanling South (constituency) =

- Elected constituency for the North District Council
- Boundary of Fanling South in North District
- District: North
- Legislative Council constituency: New Territories North
- Population: 14,716 (2019)
- Electorate: 7,693 (2019)

Current constituency
- Created: 2015
- Number of members: One
- Member: vacant
- Created from: Fanling Town, Wah Do, Yan Shing, Sheung Shui Rural, Ching Ho

Fanling South (Chinese: 粉嶺南) is one of the 18 constituencies in the North District of Hong Kong which was first created in 2015.

The constituency loosely covers Fanling with an estimated population of 14,716.

== Councillors represented ==
Election	Member	Party
2015	Raymond Ho Shu-kwong	Independent
2019	Franco Cheung→Vacant	Independent

== Election results ==
=== 2010s ===
North District Council Election, 2019: Fanling South
Party	Candidate	Votes	%	±%
Nonpartisan	Franco Cheung Ching-ho	2,735	46.28	
Nonpartisan	Raymond Ho Shu-kwong	2,507	42.42	−22.38
Ind. democrat	Almustafa Lee Lap-hong	668	11.30	
Majority		228	3.86	
Turnout		5,925	77.02	
Nonpartisan hold		Swing		

North District Council Election, 2015: Fanling South
Party	Candidate	Votes	%	±%
Independent	Raymond Ho Shu-kwong	1,824	64.8	
Third Side	Nelson Wong Sing-chi	992	35.2	
Majority		832	29.6	
Turnout		2,975	45.3	
Independent win (new seat)				
