= Franco Cheung =

Hong Kong writer and politician

Franco Cheung Ching-ho
- Born: 27 January 1987 (age 39); Hong Kong
- Education: Hong Kong Shue Yan University (BA)
- Occupations: District councilor, writer, teacher, taxi driver
- Spouse: Wait to be Written (m. 2020)

Franco Cheung Ching-ho (Chinese: 張正皓; born 27 January 1987) is a Hong Kongese writer and former district councilor of the North District Council Fanling South constituency.

== Biography ==
=== Early life ===
Cheung was born in Hong Kong on 27 January 1987. He graduated from Hong Kong Shue Yan University with a bachelor's degree in Chinese language and literature. He worked as a cram school Chinese tutor for five years after graduation, before quitting his job and becoming a taxi driver as Cheung wanted to pursue a more free but challenging lifestyle. In 2017, Cheung published Taxi, a prose collection which recorded some of his most memorable incidents as a taxi driver. It won the annual Hong Kong Book Awards in lifestyle and encyclopedic category.

=== Political career ===
During the early stages of 2019-2020 Hong Kong protests, Cheung was a volunteer driver who would pick up young protestors and drive them home. Cheung was moved by the protestors' courage and persistence and participated in the 2019 Hong Kong local elections as an independent candidate. He won the election against Raymond Ho and Almustafa Lee and became the district councilor of Fanling South constituency.

In 2021, he resigned to avoid the mandatory oath-taking requirement after the legislation of Hong Kong national security law.

== Personal life ==
Cheung was married to web novelist Wait to be Written in 2020, and they migrated to the United Kingdom in 2021.

== Bibliography ==
- Taxi (2017) ISBN 978-9-887-79574-2
- Taxi 2 (2018) ISBN 978-9-887-84901-8
- Blue Taxi (2021) ISBN 978-9-887-48117-1
