= Stewart Alexander 2012 presidential campaign =

American political campaign

Stewart Alexander for President 2012
- Campaign: U.S. presidential election, 2012
- Candidate: Stewart Alexander; Alejandro Mendoza
- Affiliation: Socialist Party USA
- Status: Lost election: November 6, 2012
- Headquarters: 339 Lafayette St. #303 New York, NY 10012
- Receipts: US$1,162 (2011-12-31)
- Slogan(s): Economic Democracy, Economic Prosperity.

Website
- http://www.stewartalexanderforpresident2012.org/

The 2012 presidential campaign of Stewart Alexander was formed soon after the 2008 presidential election. Alexander, who had previously campaigned for the Socialist Party USA nomination in 2008 and served as their Vice Presidential nominee, selected Alejandro Mendoza as his running mate. He was often discussed as a potential candidate for the 2012 Socialist Party USA presidential nomination.

On July 16, 2010, Alexander officially declared his candidacy for the President of the United States with the Socialist Party and on August 18, 2010, for the Green Party. However, on July 2, 2011, he withdrew his candidacy for the Green Party nomination. Simultaneously, on January 6, 2011, Alexander entered the race for the presidential nomination of the California-based Peace and Freedom Party.

His candidacy gained momentum when he secured the presidential nomination from the Socialist Party USA on October 15, 2011, at the Party's national convention in Los Angeles, California.

In August, Alexander sought the nomination of the Peace and Freedom Party, a ballot qualified socialist party in California. However, the nomination went to a ticket featuring comedian Roseanne Barr and anti-war activist Cindy Sheehan. Subsequently, Alexander resigned from the Steering Committee of the Peace and Freedom Party, citing a lack of support for socialist candidates by the PFP.

== Political positions ==
During his political campaign, Alexander's positions challenged the establishment, thinking of the mainstream political parties and pundits in the mainstream media. This included calling the Affordable Care Act a "corporate giveaway" that he called the "corporate restructuring of the healthcare system in America" for the benefit of private healthcare companies, supporting private Chelsea Manning saying that "whistleblowers should be protected not prosecuted," criticizing the impeachment of Paraguay's president (calling it a coup), that President Barack Obama represents the one percent not the 99 percent and that Bush-era policies of a surveillance state and permanent war have expanded under Obama's watch. Alexander has additionally demanded term limits for those in the Supreme Court and called for Justice Clarence Thomas to be impeached for not noting that he received $700,000 on a government disclosure form and for attending "secret meetings with conservative business leaders at an event sponsored and hosted by the Koch brothers" before the Citizens United vs. FEC decision. However, Alexander also took a jab at other third parties as well, like the Illinois Green Party noting that "the big surprise of this election season is that another Third Party, the Illinois Green Party, not the Democrats and Republicans are the ones resorting to dirty tricks...Rob Sherman the Chair of the Cook County Green Party...filed the challenge to get us thrown off the ballot...the innocent victim in all of this is Jill Stein...However, blocking the Socialist Party and other parties in Illinois will be a black eye for her campaign. Green Party claims to support open electoral laws will be permanently suspect unless Sherman removes his challenge."

There were a number of interviews and stories about the presidential campaign. The first instance was an interview with the blog called The Modern Left. Some excerpts from the interview are as follows:

"In a nutshell, what is your platform?
The Stewart Alexander Presidential Campaign is committed to socialism, democracy, ecology, feminism and racial equality. My :platform is committed to the transformation of capitalism through the creation of a democratic socialist society. To create a :better future for working people, my platform will offer a guide that will establish a new social and economic order in which :democracy will allow the 99% to shape our own future – in our neighborhoods, in our local government, and, perhaps most :importantly, in our economy...

Why Socialism? Can you explain for those who aren't familiar with the platform you are running on?
Capitalism has never worked for the majority of people in society. Capitalism is a system that has continuously exploited :working people in order to increase the profits of a few multi-national corporations and the world's super rich. Socialists :believe the economic model for the nation must change from capitalism to a democratic socialist economy...

What specifically makes your campaign unique?
The Stewart Alexander 2012 Presidential Campaign will offer a full democratic socialist alternative to voters. We will be a :left-wing option to the parties of the 1% - the Democrats and Republicans...

What drew you to the Socialist Party?
...In 2007, my political interests were more on a national level and the PFP was a California-based political party. I :decided to attend the national convention for the Socialist Party in St. Louis as a presidential candidate...Both the :Socialist Party and the PFP are founded on the principle of protecting the interests of working people. This idea really :attracted me to them.

Why should people vote for you instead of President Barack Obama or whomever wins the GOP nomination?
Working people should vote for me as president because I represent the people. I hope that when they read my program, or hear :me speak, or watch me on TV they will encounter ideas that connect with their everyday lives...They will also find that :President Obama represents Wall Street and the GOP candidates represent Wall Street. I come from the 99%, I live with the 99% :and I will represent political positions that will better the lives of the 99%...

Your Wikipedia bio states that you were in the Air Force Reserve. Has having a military background influenced your politics?
Near the end of my military service, I was able to look back on that experience, and I realized that war is not about :protecting our freedoms; war is big business with a high cost of human life and suffering...

As the Vice Presidential candidate on the 2008 Socialist Party ticket, do you feel that campaign made any mistakes and how :will your campaign differ this time?
My approach in 2012 has been to get my vice presidential running mate involved in the campaign from day one...

What do you think are the three most important problems facing American's today?
Jobs...Reclaiming our constitutional rights...U.S. military aggression and the costs of war

What do you plan to do to fix those issues?
...We will create jobs directly and immediately by creating an emergency national employment program :and by providing public :funding for an independent worker-owned and worker-managed cooperative sector...I will...Repeal the U.S.A. Patriot Act, and :the National Defense Authorization Act. I call for the abolition of the Central Intelligence Agency, the National Security :Agency, and all other institutions of covert warfare...I will call for an immediate 50 percent cut in the military budget, :followed by additional cuts, with the aim of rapidly reducing the military budget to less than 10 percent of its current :level...

What would you most like potential voters to know about you?
Know that I am a working person and I am just like the majority of Americans...Capitalism has failed working people; a :democratic socialist society is the new direction we need as a nation to move toward a better future.

Other places on the internet also wrote about the campaign, including an article in The Root. This article quoted Alexander at numerous times, where he notes despite the lack of coverage in the corporate media people are coming around to the idea of socialism and the article concludes with him offering the Socialist Party USA as an alternative. Another article written by Scott Tucker for Truthdig also has a favorable view. Tucker writes that "Stewart Alexander believes fair elections are worth a fair fight and he's asking for your vote...He is a democratic socialist, an African-American community activist and the presidential candidate of the Socialist Party in 2012...Alexander is not simply a "left-wing Keynesian" reformer ... Alexander has also been a strong critic of Obama's "continuation of the Bush era security state policies." He has the same moral fire and political clarity as Eugene Debs ... Alexander began looking and thinking beyond an electoral system dominated by two big corporate parties. He was briefly inspired by the campaign of Ross Perot ... The program of the Socialist Party of the United States is both class conscious and civil libertarian, and Alexander will give American voters a chance to truly make our votes count for democracy and socialism." He then proceeded in asking five questions of Alexander:

QUESTION: What are your views about rebuilding a base of manufacturing jobs in this country, beyond the sector of military :industries?
RESPONSE BY ALEXANDER:...I believe that we can rebuild the manufacturing sector in the United States...in a democratic way :that allows us to build a society based on solidarity and justice...We believe in the creation of an independent worker owned :and operated cooperative sector that can be used to rebuild the manufacturing capacity of the United States...

QUESTION: How do we make our votes count at the state and federal levels especially? What reforms are necessary to :challenge corporate politics and make electoral politics more democratic?
RESPONSE BY ALEXANDER:...Consider Citizens United a kind of high point of neoliberalism...the best way to think about :overturning such undemocratic decisions—not primarily through a legal strategy, but through a democratic revolution from :below...in the longer term, we want to fight for electoral reforms such as public financing of elections, proportional :representation and a uniform open ballot access law.

QUESTION: Overall, there are now more people in 'correctional supervision' in America—more than 6 million—than were in the :Gulag Archipelago under Stalin at its height. That city of the confined and the controlled, Lockuptown, is now the second :largest in the United States...What are your thoughts and practical proposals?
RESPONSE BY ALEXANDER:The prison-industrial complex is then used to warehouse and discipline those who have been left behind :by an economic system that only considers the needs and interests of the 1 percent...I believe that we need to enact policies :emphasizing decriminalization while also creating spaces for the self-empowerment of poor and working class people. We must :immediately end the destructive drug war by creating a legal justice system based on prevention, mediation, restitution and :rehabilitation.

QUESTION: What are your immediate demands to prevent war? What are your long-range proposals for transforming the war :economy into a commonwealth dedicated to peace?
RESPONSE BY ALEXANDER: I'll start by saying that it is very easy to hold an anti-war position...we are not only anti-war but :we are also anti-militarist...We seek to put a permanent end to the role of the U.S. military–industrial complex in our :country and in our world...Military spending is a monumental waste of resources...the death and destruction that the U.S. :military has caused throughout the world...We want to repair these bonds with socialist values of solidarity, compassion and :justice.

QUESTION: How did you find your way into the socialist movement?
RESPONSE BY ALEXANDER: There really is no one single way to get involved in radical politics. For every active socialist I :meet while campaigning, I hear a different story...As I grew older, I realized that there was political strength in numbers :and I got involved first with the Peace and Freedom Party and later the Socialist Party USA. I liked the fact that both :organizations place the interests of poor and working class people at the center of their political projects.

Beyond this, there wasn't many other sympathetic articles or such other than an article in Irregular Times which noted about Alexander: "Right wingers, this is what genuine Socialists, Marxists, Communists look like," another on the Dissenting Democrat blog which noted the campaign called for "radical democratization" of society, one on Uncovered Politics where the writer covers the campaign itself and another on examiner.com There were some videos on YouTube as well including a clip from the Stossel Show about if America could accept a socialist president, another interview with jeff4justice and numerous other video clips. Since there weren't many other stories about the campaign, the Presidential questionnaire put out by the Socialist Party USA gives some idea of his other positions as does the issues page on his website. In a pre-election message, Stewart Alexander wrote that their campaign "sought to unveil the lies of the capitalists that has given working people a false sense of hope and security that has only enslaved the minds of working people...The Alexander/Mendoza campaign believe that this campaign is marking a new beginning and is changing the conscience of the nation that capitalism will never work for working people because it is built on greed and competition; to the contrary, the Alexander/Mendoza campaign has shared the message of socialism to fosters the concept of a society that is based on compassion, empathy, respect, cooperation and the development of new social structures."

== Campaign and aftermath ==
A number of differing people endorsed Stewart Alexander. These included David McReynolds, who was the first homosexual candidate for president, the National Secretary of the Socialist Party USA Greg Pason, a teacher named Steve Soltysik, Maggie Phair of the Maggie Phair Institute, the County Chairperson of Kern County's Peace and Freedom Party named Mohammad Arif, a U.S. Senate candidate for 2012 named Kabiruddin Karim Ali and the New Progressive Alliance which stands for peace, full employment at a Living Wage, environmental sustainability, Medicare for All, Fair Trade, human rights, civil liberties, reforming elections, holding corporations accountable, and the creation of a public infrastructure bank.

In the 2012 election, Stewart Alexander garnered 4,430 votes. Instead of conceding to the newly elected President Barack Obama, Alexander wrote a "concession" letter in which he did not wish Obama success in his future endeavors but hoped that he could "forgive my inability to do so." As a result, Alexander criticized the President for continuing George W. Bush's policies, helping coordinate the crackdown on the Occupy Movement, possible future intimidation of "various leftist groups," the continuation of drone attacks which have caused numerous innocents to be killed, including an American citizen Anwar al-Awlaki," the continuation of assaults and indefinite detentions of activists, more wars that are "fossil fuels," pushing the scaling back of "our meager social safety...leaving those most in need with even less." In the end of the letter, he offers an alternative saying he will be "hoping for success for the people of the United States and for working people across the world rather than financial success of Wall Street...I will be continuing the fight to awaken the minds of the American people to the truth and striving for non-violent, democratic revolution."

More than a month later, the Socialist Party USA website interviewed Alexander in a post-election interview. In the interview they asked him twelve questions covering every aspect of his campaign. Here are some excerpts from that interview:

- "I became a candidate for president of the U.S. because I believe in socialism and I have been a victim of capitalism for my entire life. What we as socialists are striving to achieve...a democratic socialist society based upon respect and goodwill toward other members within our society...My message was not about reforming capitalism, but a total transformation of society from capitalism to socialism and the development of new social structures."
- "Today, it is impossible for third party candidates and minor parties to compete with the big-money parties and in the 21st century...the bar has been raised to manage a successful presidential campaign in the U.S....at a half billion dollars to enter and $1 billion for the top two."
- "Through the Internet and Facebook, the campaign was invited to speak at high school and college campuses...[and this] helped the Alexander/Mendoza campaign to reach tens of millions of working people throughout the U.S. and internationally."
- "During these difficult times...millions of working people are now open to socialist ideas. The Alexander/Mendoza campaign was always clear....that we are committed to the transformation of capitalism through the creation of a democratic socialist society...Therefore, messages about jobs and earnings were most effective. This message reached all age groups."
- "As a presidential candidate...the challenges were few. When someone challenged me regarding homeless issues, I could respond that I was homeless in Los Angeles for months. When I was challenged regarding poverty issues, I could say that I lived in poverty as a child. When I was challenged on labor issues, I spoke to them based upon my experience as a retail clerk"
- "There was little interest [in the campaign] from the corporate media until a few weeks prior to the General Election...I've always believed that you can accomplish anything with enough money, time or effort. The Alexander/Mendoza campaign effectively maximized the latter two; we collectively donated time and effort."
- "The greatest surprise during the campaign was during the state convention of the Peace and Freedom Party...The PFP delegates chose to have a comedian as their presidential nominee [Roseanne Barr]. If we wish to collectively build the socialist movement, we must choose our representatives well. We need Socialists who understand that only socialism will provide for the future needs of working people, and that the challenges of working people will not be resolved by reforms or comic relief."
- "I do not intend to run for public office in the future...It is time for me to give a little back and spend more time with the one I love."
- "I believe the U.S. political system is completely corrupt. We must continue to lead. However, it will not be in Congress or the White House...The Occupy movement is the face of a revolution that is crossing the nation. I believe we will win because capitalism is destined to fail."
