= 2019 North District Council election =

Hong Kong local election

- 24 November 2019

18 (of the 22) seats to North District Council 11 seats needed for a majority
- Turnout: 69.7% ▲24.1%
	First party	Second party	Third party
Party	Democratic	Neo Democrats	DAB
Last election	3 seat, 17.5%	1 seat, 5.0%	8 seats, 31.2%
Seats before	2	2	7
Seats won	5	3	1
Seat change	▲3	▲1	▼6
Popular vote	19,898	17,520	31,311
Percentage	15.4%	13.5%	24.2%
Swing	▼2.1%	▲8.5%	▼7.0%
	Fourth party	Fifth party	Sixth party
Party	FTU	NDB	Luen Wo United
Last election	3 seats, 7.7%	New party	New party
Seats before	3	0	0
Seats won	1	1	1
Seat change	▼2	▲1	▲1
Popular vote	9,087	5,288	4,491
Percentage	7.0%	4.1%	3.5%
Swing	▼0.7%	N/A	N/A
- Colours on map indicate winning party for each constituency.

The 2019 North District Council election was held on 24 November 2015 to elect all 18 elected members to the 22-member North District Council of Hong Kong.

The pro-democrats took control of the council by taking 15 seats in a historic landslide victory amid the massive pro-democracy protests. The pro-Beijing parties almost lost all their seats, retaining only three seats with DAB's Lau Kwok-fan also being unseated.

== Overall election results ==
Before election:

↓
4	18
Pro-dem	Pro-Beijing

Change in composition:

↓
15	7
Pro-democracy	Pro-Beijing

North Council election result 2019
Party	Seats	Gains	Losses	Net gain/loss	Seats %	Votes %	Votes	+/−
Independent	3	5	2	+3	16.7	28.0	36,296	
DAB	1	0	6	−6	5.5	24.2	31,311	−7.0
Democratic	5	2	0	+3	27.8	15.4	19,898	−2.1
Neo Democrats	3	1	0	+1	16.7	13.5	17,520	+8.5
FTU	1	0	2	−2	5.5	7.0	9,087	−0.7
NDB	1	1	0	+1	5.6	4.1	5,288	
Luen Wo United	1	1	0	0	5.6	3.5	4,491	
FPHE	0	0	0	0	0.0	2.2	2,871	
NPP	0	0	0	0	0.0	2.1	2,684	
