= Starry Lee =

Hong Kong politician

The Honourable Starry Lee GBS JP
- 李慧琼
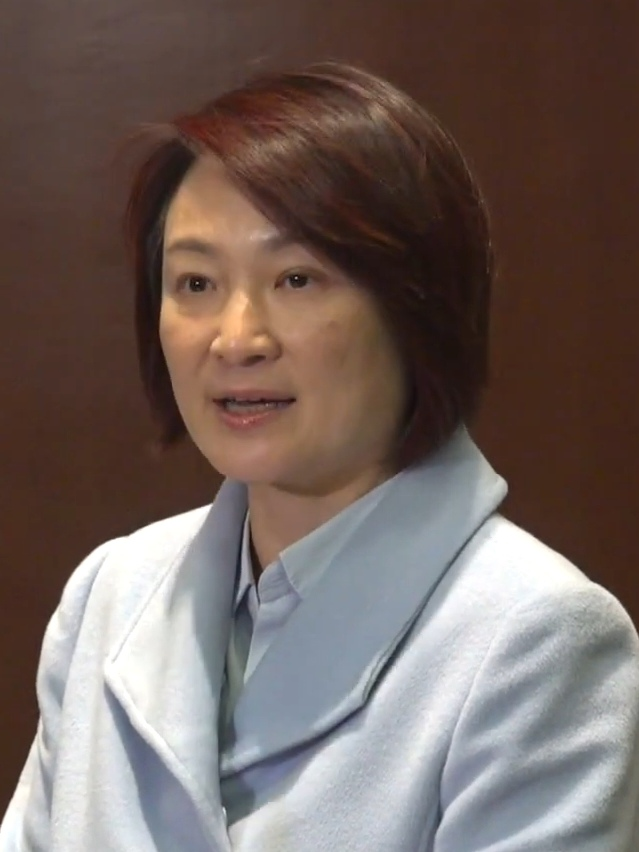
- Lee in January 2026

4th President of the Legislative Council
- Incumbent
- Assumed office 8 January 2026
- Preceded by: Andrew Leung

Member of the Standing Committee of the National People's Congress
- Incumbent
- Assumed office 11 March 2023
- Preceded by: Tam Yiu-chung

Chairwoman of the Democratic Alliance for the Betterment and Progress of Hong Kong
- In office 17 April 2015 – 25 September 2023
- Preceded by: Tam Yiu-chung
- Succeeded by: Gary Chan

Member of the Executive Council
- In office 1 July 2012 – 17 March 2016
- Appointed by: Leung Chun-ying
- Preceded by: Lau Kong-wah
- Succeeded by: Ip Kwok-him

Member of the Legislative Council
- Incumbent
- Assumed office 1 January 2022
- Preceded by: New constituency
- Constituency: Kowloon Central
- In office 1 October 2012 – 31 December 2021
- Preceded by: New constituency
- Succeeded by: Constituency abolished
- Constituency: District Council (Second)
- In office 1 October 2008 – 30 September 2012
- Preceded by: Tsang Yok-sing
- Succeeded by: Ann Chiang
- Constituency: Kowloon West

Member of the Kowloon City District Council
- In office 1 January 2000 – 31 December 2023
- Preceded by: New constituency
- Succeeded by: Constituency abolished
- Constituency: To Kwa Wan North

Personal details
- Born: 13 March 1974 (age 52) British Hong Kong
- Party: Democratic Alliance for the Betterment and Progress of Hong Kong
- Children: 1
- Education: Hong Kong University of Science and Technology (BBA); University of Manchester (MBA)
- Occupation: Councillor
- Profession: Accountant

Starry Lee
- Chinese: 李慧琼
Transcriptions
Standard Mandarin
- Hanyu Pinyin: Lǐ Huìqióng
Yue: Cantonese
- Yale Romanization: Léih Waih-kìhng
- Jyutping: Lei^{5} Wai^{6}-king^{4}

Starry Lee Wai-king GBS JP (Chinese: 李慧琼, born 13 March 1974) is a Hong Kong politician serving as the 4th President of the Legislative Council of Hong Kong since 2026 and has been Hong Kong's only representative in the Standing Committee of China's National People's Congress since 2023.

She has been a member of the Legislative Council since 2008 and chaired the largest pro-Beijing party in the city, the Democratic Alliance for the Betterment and Progress of Hong Kong (DAB), from 2015 to 2023. She was also a member of the Executive Council from 2012 to 2016.

== Early life and education ==
Lee was born on 13 March 1974 in Hong Kong into a working-class family and was raised in Ping Shek Estate, a public housing development. She attended Ping Shek Estate Catholic Primary School and FDBWA Szeto Ho Secondary School, where she was a head prefect in Form 6.

She attained A grades for accounting and history in the Hong Kong Certificate of Education Examination. When considering the two subject areas as career paths, her parents persuaded her to become an accountant because they believed those professionals led a more stable life. She studied accounting at the Hong Kong University of Science and Technology, during which she was part of the debate team. She graduated with a Bachelor of Business Administration in 1996.

After graduation, Lee became an accountant and worked for KPMG in Hong Kong. Before working for KPMG Hong Kong, Lee had also been employed by PricewaterhouseCoopers and Crowe Hong Kong.

She then obtained a Master of Business Administration from the University of Manchester in 2010 and a doctoral degree in laws from Tsinghua University in 2024.

== District Council career ==
In the 1990s, Lee received political mentorship from Li Lin, a pro-Beijing district councillor. At a self-improvement course, Lee met lawyer and DAB member Chiu Tse-kuen, who was running in the 1999 district council elections for To Kwa Wan North, where Lee lived. He invited her to campaign and visit contituents with him. However, when submitting his candidacy, Chiu discovered that he had not declared a change of address and was therefore ineligible to stand. Lee's efforts on the campaign impressed the party leadership, leading her to run in place of Chiu as a pro-Beijing independent. A member of the Hong Kong Federation of Trade Unions, she campaigned as a unionist.

After a month of campaigning, Lee was elected with 965 votes (70.6%), more than double the votes for incumbent candidate Lam Ming, who received 402 votes (29.4%). At 26, Lee became the youngest district councillor.

She defended her seat with a wide margin in the 2003 elections with 1,392 votes (72.7%), defeating Richard Tse, who took 523 votes (27.3%). That was despite a political environment unfavourable to the pro-Beijing camp. In 2003, the camp faced its worst electoral defeat after the Hong Kong government tabled a controversial national security bill, overall unpopularity of the Tung Chee-hwa government and during economic malaise caused by the SARS epidemic.

In June 2004, she joined the DAB as the party sought wider support beyond its working-class base. Along with Horace Cheung, Gary Chan, and Ben Chan, Lee was considered part of the party's "second-tier" members of mostly younger professionals.

After Tsang resigned as party leader for the DAB's poor performance at the election, he recruited Lee to join his candidate list for the 2004 Legislative Council election to target young, professional and female voters. She was listed third on a ticket of three candidates and helped Tsang to win a seat in Kowloon West. By 2005, the party had targeted Lee for training, with Tsang as her mentor.

== Legislative Council career ==
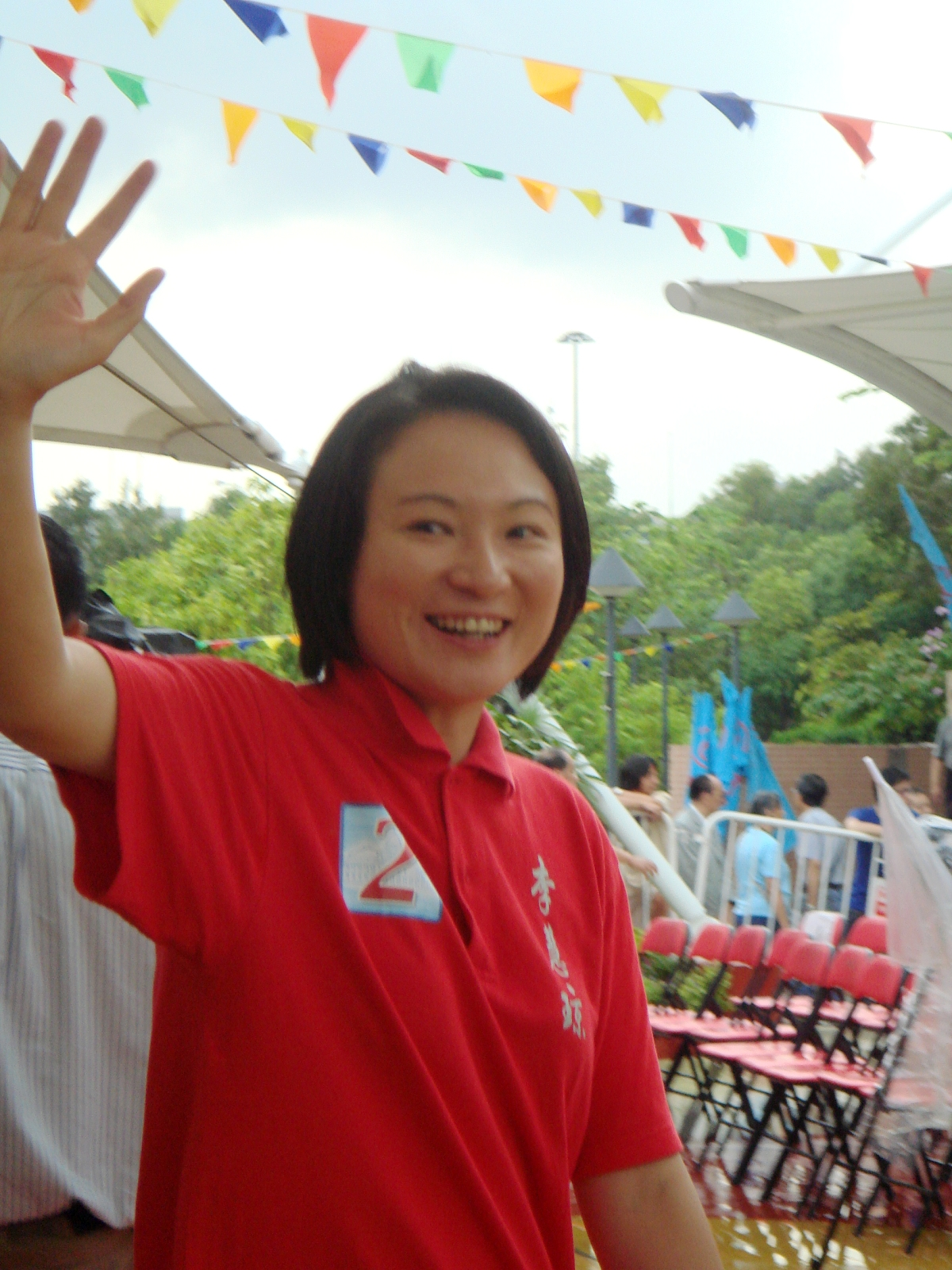
Lee attending an edition of City Forum in 2008 as a LegCo candidate

In the 2008 Legislative Council election, Tsang switched his constituency to Hong Kong Island, allowing Lee to stand for the vacant seat he left in Kowloon West. Her campaign was run by Kan Chi-ho, who was also Tsang's campaign manager. Kan took Lee to meet community leaders to seek their support. She was ranked first on the candidate list, before Chung Kong-mo, Chan Wai-ming, and Vincent Cheng.

Lee's list received 39,013 votes (18.9%), the most in the constituency, allowing her to join the Legislative Council. As a new legislator, she was unfamiliar with many public policy issues and found it difficult understand them in a short period of time.

In 2011, she was elected vice-chairwoman of the party.

In 2012, she was appointed to the Executive Council by Chief Executive Leung Chun-ying. At the time, she was the only person to hold positions in three different levels of representative councils, the Executive, Legislative and District Councils. She served on the Executive Council until her resignation in March 2016 to focus on her work on the Legislative Council and the party. Her position was taken by Ip Kwok-him, a long-time DAB legislator.

In the 2012 Legislative Council election, Lee left Kowloon West to contest one of five seats in the new District Council (Second) functional constituency that is elected by all voters in Hong Kong. Her ticket received 277,143 votes (17.4%), the second-most votes received behind the ticket of the Democratic Party's James To that received 316,468 votes (19.9%).

On 17 April 2015, she replaced Tam Yiu-chung as the leader of the DAB, making her the first woman to hold the post. She was the youngest party chairperson at age 41; the transition was described as a generational shift. DAB legislator Leung Che-cheung commented that Lee was qualified but inexperienced to assert authority, unlike veteran politicians such as Tam or Ip Kwok-him. Lee said that the party did not operate by personal authority but consultation and discussion.

On becoming leader, Lee said she aimed to take more seats in the 2015 District Council elections by focusing on voters who were against the 2014 Hong Kong protests, and to continue to support universal suffrage in Chief Executive elections from 2017.

In March 2016, she resigned from the Executive Council to focus on the DAB.

After Lee was re-elected in the 2016 election, she succeeded Andrew Leung of the Business and Professionals Alliance for Hong Kong (BPA) as the House Committee chairperson, the second-highest office in the Legislative Council.

On 18 May 2020, Lee was re-elected as House Committee chairperson. Prior to the vote, Chan Kin-por, the nominee of Legislative Council president Andrew Leung, had taken the seat of the presiding member – a position which had been held since October 2019 by pro-democrat Dennis Kwok – with the help of security personnel, and 15 pro-democratic lawmakers had been removed from the meeting room after scuffles had broken out; during Lee's election, three pro-democrats sat outside the room in protest. After the physical removal of the pro-democratic lawmakers, Lee was elected.

In March 2021, Lee supported changes that would reduce the power of Legislative Council members, claiming that opposition members had blocked legislation and caused a power vacuum.

In October 2021, Lee and fellow lawmaker Holden Chow were criticised by the mother of Amber Poon, claiming that Lee and Chow were "vanishing" after holding a press conference in 2019 with her, to push forward the 2019 Hong Kong extradition bill.

During the 2021 Hong Kong legislative election, Lee dismissed concerns that the record-low voter turnout of 30.2% was problematic.

In December 2021, Lee was re-elected through Kowloon Central constituency with 95,976 votes.

In January 2022, Lee, Andrew Leung and Ma Fung-kwok pushed for the Chinese national emblem to be permanently added to the Legislative Council chamber. Leung had earlier said it would be only temporary for the swearing in of lawmakers.

In August, Lee announced that 16 members of the DAB would travel overseas to clarify any "misunderstandings" businesspeople may have about Hong Kong.

In November, after a rugby match in South Korea played Glory to Hong Kong for the Hong Kong team, Lee said that Asia Rugby should apologise to "the entire [Chinese] population."

== President of the Legislative Council ==
In September 2025, Andrew Leung announced his intention not to seek re-election as the President of the Legislative Council after the end of the 7th legislative session. In the legislative election in December, Lee was re-elected through Kowloon Central with 53,529 votes (41.2%), a plurality in the constituency.

On 2 January 2026, 10 Legislative Council members nominated Lee to run for President of the Legislative Council. Colleagues who supported her included Liberal Party Chairman Peter Shiu, priest Peter Douglas Koon, businessman Andrew Lam Siu-lo, and DAB members Ben Chan and Jody Kwok. In the chamber before the vote, Lee said once elected she would no longer take part in meetings or decision-making of the DAB parliamentary group. She also promised "on principle" to abstain from voting on resolutions or expressing her opinion on policy issues. On policy, she said the council should accommodate the national 15th Five-Year Plan and cooperate with the Hong Kong executive branch under an "executive-led" system — a system of governance that favours a strong executive of career officials loyal to Beijing with weaker power and checks and balances from the legislative branch. Lee narrowly defeated Chan Chun-ying, the pro-Beijing legislator for the finance sector, with 47 against Chan's 42.

== National politics ==
In 2018, she was invited to sit on the 13th National Committee of the Chinese People's Political Consultative Conference (CPPCC).

In February 2022, Lee did not attend the 2022 Two Sessions as a Hong Kong delegate.

In March 2023, Lee was elected to the National People's Congress and succeeded Tam Yiu-chung as Hong Kong's delegate to the Standing Committee of the National People's Congress (NPCSC). In August, she announced that she would not seek re-election as DAB chair because of "limited time and work capability". Gary Chan succeeded her as party leader a month later.

== Political positions ==
=== Education ===
Lee opposed abolishing the Territory-wide System Assessment for Primary 3 students in 2015.

=== Same-sex relationships ===
Lee did not attend the 2026 vote on the Registration of Same-sex Partnerships Bill, which proposed a framework to grant limited legal rights to same-sex partnerships recognised outside Hong Kong. She said she understood that same-sex partners "faced difficulties" in areas such as hospital visitation rights and inheritance, but said the government should consider solutions without resorting to legislation.

== Personal life ==
Lee has a daughter with her husband, who works in the logistics industry.

== See also ==
- District Council (Second)

Political offices
New constituency	Member of Kowloon City District Council; Representative for To Kwa Wan North; 2000–2023	Constituency abolished
Preceded by Lau Kong-wah	Non-official Member of Executive Council; 2012–2016	Succeeded by Ip Kwok-him
Legislative Council of Hong Kong
Preceded by Jasper Tsang	Member of Legislative Council; Representative for Kowloon West; 2008–2012	Succeeded by Ann Chiang
New constituency	Member of Legislative Council; Representative for District Council (Second); 2012–2021	Constituency abolished
New constituency	Member of Legislative Council; Representative for Kowloon Central; 2022–present	Incumbent
Preceded by Andrew Leung	Chairman of House Committee; 2016–present	Incumbent
Party political offices
Preceded by Tam Yiu-chung	Chairman of Democratic Alliance for the Betterment and Progress of Hong Kong; 2015–2023	Succeeded by Gary Chan
National People's Congress
Preceded by Tam Yiu-chung	Member of Standing Committee; Representative for Hong Kong SAR; 2023–present	Incumbent
Order of precedence
Preceded by Wong Ting-kwong; Member of the Legislative Council	Hong Kong order of precedence Member of the Legislative Council	Succeeded by Gary Chan; Member of the Legislative Council
