= Yan Shing (constituency) =

- Elected constituency for the North District Council
- Boundary of Yan Shing in North District
- District: North
- Legislative Council constituency: New Territories North
- Population: 19,314 (2019)
- Electorate: 14,227 (2019)

Current constituency
- Created: 2003
- Number of members: One
- Member: Vacant

Yan Shing (Chinese: 欣盛) is one of the 18 constituencies in the North District, Hong Kong. The constituency returns one district councillor to the North District Council, with an election every four years.

Yan Shing constituency is loosely based on Yan Shing Court in Fanling with estimated population of 19,314.

== Councillors represented ==
Election	Member	Party
2003	Adrian Lau Tak-cheong	Democratic→Independent
2007	Lau Kwok-fan	DAB
2011	Lau Kwok-fan	DAB
2015	Lau Kwok-fan	DAB
2019	Lam Shuk-ching→Vacant (Note: Resigned.)	Neo Democrats

== Election results ==
=== 2010s ===
North District Council Election, 2019: Yan Shing
Party	Candidate	Votes	%	±%
Neo Democrats	Lam Shuk-ching	5,939	57.84	
DAB	Lau Kwok-fan	4,329	42.16	
Majority		1,610	15.68	
Turnout		10,306	72.92	
Neo Democrats gain from DAB		Swing		

North District Council Election, 2015: Yan Shing
Party	Candidate	Votes	%	±%
DAB	Lau Kwok-fan	Unopposed		
DAB hold		Swing		

North District Council Election, 2011: Yan Shing
Party	Candidate	Votes	%	±%
DAB	Lau Kwok-fan	4,791	83.7	+6.7
Democratic	Alexander Yan Wing-lok	935	16.3	
DAB hold		Swing		

=== 2000s ===
North District Council Election, 2007: Yan Shing
Party	Candidate	Votes	%	±%
DAB	Lau Kwok-fan	4,159	77.0	+30.4
Independent	Adrian Lau Tak-cheong	1,239	23.0	–30.4
DAB hold		Swing		

North District Council Election, 2003: Yan Shing
Party	Candidate	Votes	%	±%
Democratic	Adrian Lau Tak-cheong	2,210	53.4	
DAB	Lau Kwok-fan	1,930	46.6	
Democratic win (new seat)				
