= To Kwa Wan North (constituency) =

Hong Kong constituency

- Elected constituency for the Kowloon City District Council
- Boundary of To Kwa Wan North in Kowloon City District
- District: Kowloon City
- Legislative Council constituency: Kowloon Central
- Population: 14,682 (2019)
- Electorate: 5,258 (2019)

Current constituency
- Created: 1982 (first time); 1999 (second time)
- Number of members: One
- Member: Starry Lee (DAB)
- Created from: To Kwa Wan

To Kwa Wan North
- Traditional Chinese: 土瓜灣北
- Simplified Chinese: 土瓜湾北
Transcriptions
Standard Mandarin
- Hanyu Pinyin: Tǔguāwān Běi
Yue: Cantonese
- Jyutping: tou2 gwaa1 waan1 bak1

To Kwa Wan North is one of the 22 constituencies of the Kowloon City District Council. The seat elects one member of the council every four years. The seat has continuously been held by Starry Lee since 1999. The boundary is loosely based on the Northern area of To Kwa Wan.

== Councillors represented ==
=== 1982 to 1985 ===
Election	Member	Party
1982	Lam Ming	Nonpartisan

=== 1985 to 1991 ===
Election	First Member	First Party	Second Member	Second Party
1985	Lam Ming	Nonpartisan	Mak King-lun	Nonpartisan
1991	Constituency abolished			

=== 1999 to present ===
Election	Member	Party
1999	Starry Lee Wai-king	Nonpartisan
2007	Starry Lee Wai-king	FTU/DAB
2011	Starry Lee Wai-king	DAB

== Election results ==
=== 2010s ===
Kowloon City District Council Election, 2019: To Kwa Wan North
Party	Candidate	Votes	%	±%
DAB	Starry Lee Wai-king	1,881	55.02	−25.18
LSD	Leung Kwok-hung	1,538	44.98	
Majority		343	10.04	
Turnout		3,430	65.25	
DAB hold		Swing		

Kowloon City District Council Election, 2015: To Kwa Wan North
Party	Candidate	Votes	%	±%
DAB	Starry Lee Wai-king	1,544	80.2	–2.5
Nonpartisan	Shum Tai-fung	204	10.6	
HKAA	Lam Yi-lai	177	9.2	
Majority		1,340	69.6	
Turnout		1,983	37.2	
DAB hold		Swing		

Kowloon City District Council Election, 2011: To Kwa Wan North
Party	Candidate	Votes	%	±%
DAB	Starry Lee Wai-king	1,534	82.65	
Democratic	Cody Wong Tze-hei	322	17.35	
Majority		1,212	65.30	
DAB hold		Swing		

=== 2000s ===
Kowloon City District Council Election, 2007: To Kwa Wan North
Party	Candidate	Votes	%	±%
FTU (DAB)	Starry Lee Wai-king	1,472	81.87	
ADPL	Cheng Kwun-man	326	18.13	
Majority		1,146	63.74	
FTU hold		Swing		

Kowloon City District Council Election, 2003: To Kwa Wan North
Party	Candidate	Votes	%	±%
Independent	Starry Lee Wai-king	1,392	72.68	
Democratic	Richard Keller Tse	523	27.31	
Majority		869	45.38	
Independent hold		Swing		

=== 1990s ===
Kowloon City District Council Election, 1999: To Kwa Wan North
Party	Candidate	Votes	%	±%
Nonpartisan	Starry Lee Wai-king	965	70.59	
HKPA	Lam Ming	402	29.41	
Majority		563	41.19	
Nonpartisan win (new seat)				

=== 1980s ===
Kowloon City District Board Election, 1988: To Kwa Wan North
Party	Candidate	Votes	%	±%
Nonpartisan	Lam Ming	2,187	70.0	+6.9
Nonpartisan	Mak King-lun	1,266	50.2	+10.6
Nonpartisan	Chan Pak-chi	974	38.7	
Nonpartisan hold		Swing		
Nonpartisan hold		Swing		

Kowloon City District Board Election, 1985: To Kwa Wan North
Party	Candidate	Votes	%	±%
Nonpartisan	Lam Ming	2,187	63.1	+15.9
Nonpartisan	Mak King-lun	1,373	39.6	
Nonpartisan	Lee Wai-tsang	1,370	39.5	+0.3
Nonpartisan hold		Swing		
Nonpartisan win (new seat)				

Kowloon City District Board Election, 1982: To Kwa Wan North
Party	Candidate	Votes	%	±%
Nonpartisan	Lam Ming	1,112	47.2	
Nonpartisan	Lee Wai-tsang	922	39.2	
Nonpartisan	Ip Yam-kei	310	13.2	
Nonpartisan win (new seat)				
