= Hau Chi-keung =

- 侯志強
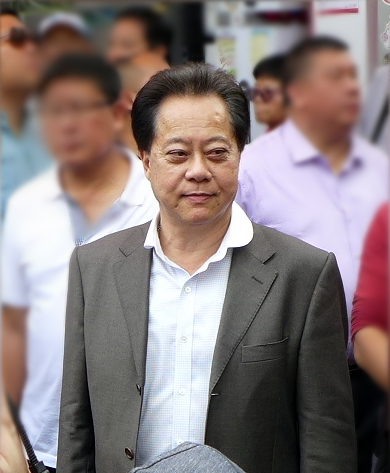

Chairman of the Sheung Shui Rural Committee
- Incumbent
- Assumed office 22 March 2007
- Preceded by: Lau Ying-wo

Member of the North District Council
- Incumbent
- Assumed office 22 March 2007
- Preceded by: Lau Ying-wo

Personal details
- Born: 1956 (age 69–70) Hong Kong
- Party: Liberal Party (until 2016)

Bowie Hau Chi-keung (Chinese: 侯志強; born 1956) is a rural leader and businessman in Hong Kong. He is the current chairman of the Sheung Shui Rural Committee, ex officio executive committee member of the Heung Yee Kuk and ex officio member of the North District Council.

== Family and early life ==
Hau is born in Ho Sheung Heung, Sheung Shui, New Territories in Hong Kong into the Hau clan, one of the five great clans in the New Territories in 1956. His father was a sailor and his mother was a farmer. He was the eldest of seven siblings. Hau got a job as a dockworker when he was just 13 and was convicted of theft when he was 18.

Hau travelled around Britain, the Netherlands and the United States for 10 years. He opened a Chinese restaurant in Chicago when he was 20 and later made his fortune by buying and selling restaurants. He returned to Hong Kong in the 1980s and started a business exporting goldfish and bloodworms which brought him HK$1 million per month. He later turned into property.

== Political career ==
Hau had been the indigenous inhabitant representative of Ho Sheung Heung from 1999 until 2011, when he ran as a resident representative of the same village in the village representative election. As a village representative, Hau sat on the Sheung Shui Rural Committee and became chairman of the rural committee since 2007. As the chairman of the rural committee, he has also been ex officio member of the North District Council.

In 2011, he defeated horse trainer Brian Kan by 44 to 16 votes to retain his post as chairman. Kan was later found out engaging in corrupt conduct during an election. It was revealed in the court that Hau had recorded some of Kan's meetings in which the bribery was taken place and even had a video recording.

Hau is a vociferous supporter of the government's controversial plans to establish a new town in northeast New Territories. His clan owns 93 hectares of land in Kwu Tung North, and would receive more than HK$5 billion in compensation for development. He had also declared repeatedly that even the Hau clan's ancestral hall could be sold for the right price. Hau dismisses farmers who refuse to vacate the land as unscrupulous squatters. He was sued by an 85-year-old farmer Lau Oi-kiu in 2015 of dumping waste on her farmland in Ho Sheung Heung to drive her off in 2009. Hau was branded "contemptuous of the law" and had to pay Lau HK$1.41 million in compensation.

As the chairman of the Sheung Shui Rural Committee, Hau is an ex officio executive committee member of the Heung Yee Kuk, a powerful organ which oversees 600 villages and 1,500 village chiefs and represents the rural interests. He fiercely attacks calls for the government to end its Small House Policy, which allows male descendants of indigenous residents to apply to build a village house of up to three-storeys, on a site of no more than 700 square feet, without paying a premium for conversion of land use. He also once called middle-aged professionals who have yet to own property as "useless basketcases" which caused public uproar.

In 2015, Hau planned to form a new political party with other like-minded rural leaders independent from the Kuk for the 2016 Legislative Council election, due to his dissatisfaction over the Kuk's handling of the case of 11 Sha Tin villagers selling their own land rights under the Small House Policy for profit. He also dissatisfied with the pro-Beijing allies which he argued that they had not always spoken up for the villagers' interests. However, his plan was opposed by other faction in the Kuk. The inauguration ceremony of the New Progressive Alliance was cancelled in the last minute. He later quit the Liberal Party and ran as an independent in the election.

Political offices
| Preceded by Lau Ying-wo | Chairman of Sheung Shui Rural Committee; 2007–present | Incumbent |
| Preceded by Lau Ying-wo | Member of North District Council; 2007–present | Incumbent |
