= Wait to be Written =

Hong Kong novelist

- Born: 1995 (age 29–30) Hong Kong
- Occupation: writer
- Spouse: Franco Cheung (m. 2020)

Wait to be Written (Chinese: 理想很遠; born 1995) is a Hong Kong web novelist known for writing sci-fi and fantasy fiction.

== Biography ==
Wait to be Written was born in Hong Kong in 1995 and later graduated from university with a bachelor's degree in English. She became interested in Hong Kong literature during her university years, which inspired her in writing and her writing style is strongly influenced by renowned local writers, such as Liu Yichang and Dung Kai-cheung. She wrote and published her first novel, The Boy who loves Eason Chan's songs (愛聽陳奕迅的男孩——講一個第三者的故事), on HKGolden and LIHKG in 2014. In 2017, she published Regret Amending Yorozuya (遺憾修正萬事屋), an urban fantasy novel which became viral on the internet and received positive reception from the netizens. A paperback version was published in the same year, and the first edition had already sold out during the annual Hong Kong Book Fair. The novel had also been adapted into a stageplay and radio drama by 57 Studio and CUHK Campus Radio respectively. Three more novels which share a similar setting with Regret Amending Yorozuya were published in 2018, 2019 and 2021, namely We Met For Our Sins (孽債府), Short Tour (時光短路) and Trust Receiver's Office (誠信破產管理局). After migrating to the United Kingdom, Wait to be Written pursued a writing career based in Taiwan and began writing a dystopian trilogy following Atonement Psychology, citing the 2019–2020 Hong Kong protests as an influence on her work. In 2023, she won the 21st Mystery Writers of Taiwan Essay Award for her novella 0037, becoming the third Hong Kong writer to receive this honor. In 2024, she published Department of Based on True Stories, the final installment of the dystopian trilogy, which revolves around a government department tasked with altering the truth and publishing fake news, and she won the 2023 KadoKado Million Award with the novel.

Aside from writing web novels, Wait to be Written also served as an administrative executive for an acting company.

== Bibliography ==
- Regret Amending Yorozuya (遺憾修正萬事屋; 2017) ISBN 978-9-88-779573-5
- We Met For Our Sins (孽債府; 2018) ISBN 978-9-88-784895-0
- Hanami (花見; 2019) ISBN 978-9-88-792762-4
- Short Tour (時光短路; 2019) ISBN 978-9-88-792772-3
- Atonement Psychology (人格試驗; 2020) ISBN 978-9-88-748111-9
- Trust Receiver's Office (誠信破產管理局; 2021) ISBN 978-9-88-748121-8
- Second Her Second Life (第二人妻; 2022) ISBN 978-9-88-748126-3
- Fortūna (命運列車; 2022) ISBN 978-9-88-761885-0
- Department of Based on True Stories (真人真事改編部; 2024) ISBN 978-6-26-400856-3
