= Ip Kwok-him =

Hong Kong politician

The Honourable Ip Kwok-him GBM, GBS, JP
- 葉國謙
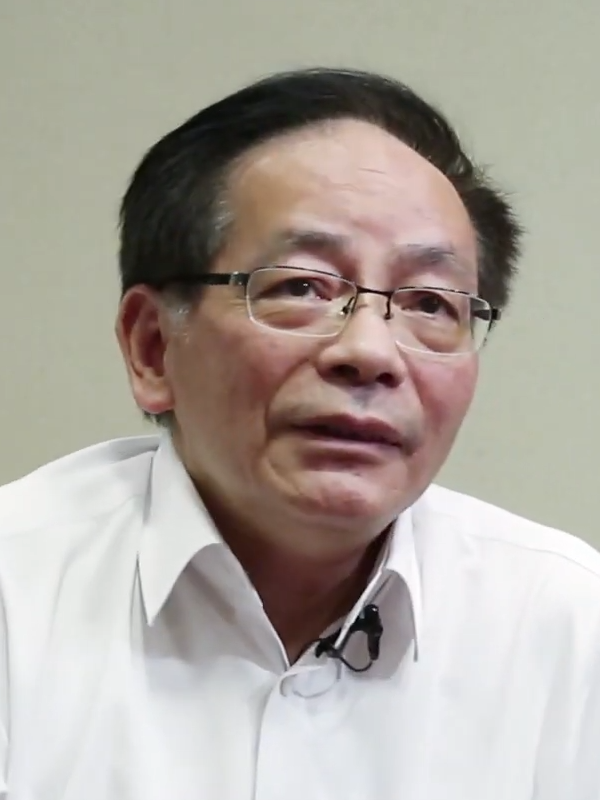
- Ip in 2020

Non-official Member of the Executive Council
- In office 17 March 2016 – 30 June 2020
- Appointed by: Leung Chun-ying; Carrie Lam
- Preceded by: Starry Lee
- Succeeded by: Gary Chan

Member of the Legislative Council
- In office 1 October 2008 – 30 September 2016
- Preceded by: Lau Wong-fat
- Succeeded by: Lau Kwok-fan
- Constituency: District Council (First)
- In office 1 October 2000 – 30 September 2004
- Preceded by: New constituency
- Succeeded by: Lau Wong-fat
- Constituency: District Council (First)

Personal details
- Born: 8 November 1951 (age 74) British Hong Kong
- Party: Democratic Alliance for the Betterment and Progress of Hong Kong
- Spouse: Lee Ngan-yee
- Education: South China Normal University (BA)
- Occupation: Legislative Councillor

Ip Kwok-him
- Traditional Chinese: 葉國謙
- Simplified Chinese: 叶国谦
Transcriptions
Standard Mandarin
- Hanyu Pinyin: Yè Guó qiān
Yue: Cantonese
- Yale Romanization: Yihp Gwok hīm
- Jyutping: Jip^{6} Gwok^{3} him^{1}

Ip Kwok-him, GBM, GBS, JP (Chinese: 葉國謙; born 8 November 1951) is a former unofficial member of the Executive Council of Hong Kong, served between 2016 and 2022. He is also former member of the Legislative Council of Hong Kong for the District Council (First) functional constituency and Hong Kong delegate to the National People's Congress and the former convenor of the caucus of the Democratic Alliance for the Betterment and Progress of Hong Kong (DAB) in the Legislative Council. He was awarded the Grand Bauhinia Medal (GBM) by the Hong Kong SAR Government in 2017.

== Early life, education and teaching career ==
Ip was born in Hong Kong on 8 November 1951 to a driver father. His father came from Guangzhou before the Chinese Communist Party took over. He studied at the Hon Wah College, a leftist pro-Communist school in the Western District. He later graduated from the South China Normal University with a degree in Bachelor of Art in Geography. After he graduated, he returned to the Hon Wah College as a teacher where he taught for 20 years.

== 1967 Leftist riots ==
During the 1967 Hong Kong riots, he was member of the Committee of Hong Kong and Kowloon Compatriots from All Circles for Struggle Against British Hong Kong Persecution as a student of the Hon Wah College. He was sent to Macao by the Hong Kong Federation of Trade Unions (HKFTU) to learn about the December 3 Incident launched by the Macao leftists which successfully led to the concession from Portuguese colonial government.

== Political career ==
=== District Councillor ===
He became active in local politics in the mid-1980s when he became vice chairman of a research centre for the development of the Central and Western District, a supplementary member of the Central and Western District Board. He also co-founded the working committee on concerning the Hong Kong Basic Law with Ambrose Lau Hon-chuen, the chairman of the Central and Western District Board.

He first ran for office in the 1991 District Board elections, for the Central and Western District Board in the Kennedy Town West & Mount Davis. He was elected with incumbent Chan Tak-chor, receiving 2,942 votes and defeating incumbent Wong Sui-lai of the pro-democratic United Democrats of Hong Kong (UDHK).

In the 1994 District Board elections, he was re-elected in Kwun Lung and held the seat until he was defeated by legislator Cyd Ho Sau-lan of the pro-democratic The Frontier in the 2003 District Council elections when his party suffered a devastating defeat in the territory-wide local election.

He won back the seat in Kwun Lung in 2007 and held the seat until he stepped down in 2015.

=== Legislative Councillor ===
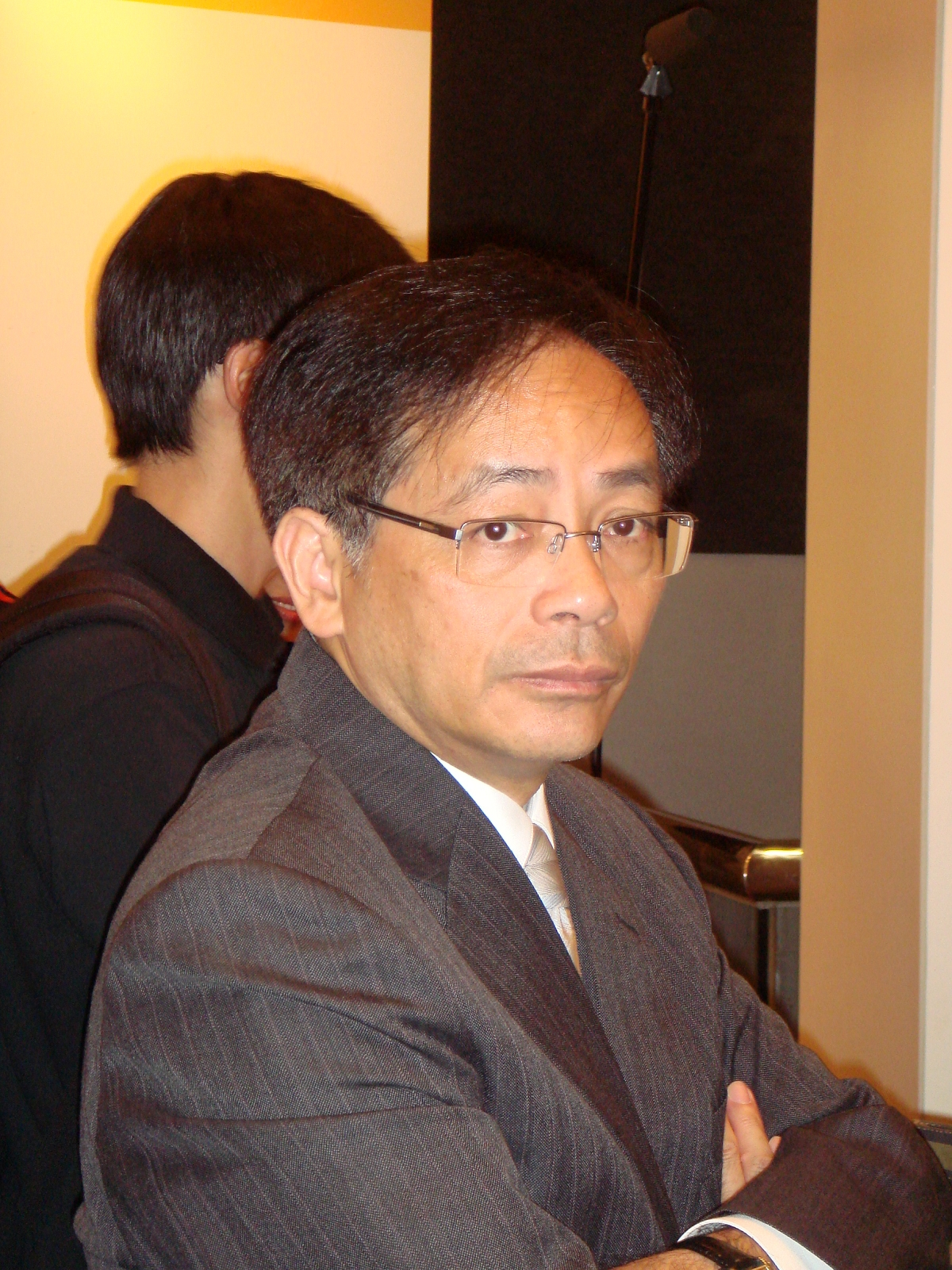
Ip in 2008 as a Legislative Council member

He became a founding member of the Democratic Alliance for the Betterment of Hong Kong (DAB), a flagship pro-Beijing party set up by a group of traditional leftists in 1992. He was a long-time chairman of the party, serving from 1998 to 2009.

He was first elected to the Legislative Council of Hong Kong in the last colonial legislative election in 1995 through the ten-seat Election Committee consisting of all District Board members. In 1996, he was appointed to the Beijing-controlled Provisional Legislative Council.

In the first SAR legislative election in 1998, he formed a ticket with Gary Cheng Kai-nam in Hong Kong Island in which Cheng was elected. He returned to the Legislative Council in 2000 when he was elected through the newly created in District Council constituency which was elected by all District Councillors.

After he lost his District Council seat in 2003, he was not eligible to run for the constituency in the 2004 Legislative Council election. In the same year, he was awarded the Gold Bauhinia Star (GBS) by the government.

He returned to the Legislative Council through the same constituency in 2008 and has held the seat since then. After retiring from the District Council in 2015, he would also step down in the upcoming 2016 Legislative Council election.

As a Legislative Councillors, Ip held many other public positions, including on the Board of directors of the Urban Renewal Authority.

He stepped down from the Legislative Council in 2016 and was succeeded by Lau Kwok-fan.

==== 2015 electoral reform walkout ====
According to a chat record leaked to the South China Morning Post, Ip, as the convenor of the DAB caucus and the coordinator of the pro-Beijing camp, was responsible together with the Legislative Council President Jasper Tsang Yok-sing for the walk-out that resulted in a humiliating defeat of the pro-Beijing parties in the electoral reform voting at the Legislative Council in July 2015.

=== Executive Councillor ===
Ip was appointed to the Executive Council of Hong Kong by Chief Executive Leung Chun-ying on 17 March 2016, succeeding resigning DAB chairwoman Starry Lee Wai-king.

He is also a Hong Kong deputy to the China's National People's Congress.

In February 2021, Ip said that he supported reforms to the election system in Hong Kong proposed by the NPCSC, and that the 117 seats district councillors hold in the chief executive election committee are held by those who "advocate mutual destruction for Hong Kong." In response, Ma Ngok from Chinese University said that doing so would eliminate public participation in choosing the chief executive.

On 5 January 2022, Chief Executive Carrie Lam announced new warnings and restrictions against social gathering due to potential COVID-19 outbreaks. One day later, it was discovered that Caspar Tsui attended a birthday party hosted by Witman Hung Wai-man, with 222 guests. At least one guest tested positive with COVID-19, causing many guests to be quarantined. Ip, several times, later called on Carrie Lam to be lenient towards Tsui.

In February 2022, after the Witman Hung birthday party controversy, Ng defended Hung and said that "I don’t think we need to discuss punishing Hung as he did not cause disrepute to the NPC".

== Family ==
Ip is married with one son and one daughter. His twin brother, Ip Kwok-chung, is a former member of the Urban Council of Hong Kong and the Yau Tsim Mong District Council. His nephew, Chris Ip Ngo-tung, is the current chairman of the Yau Tsim Mong District Council.

Legislative Council of Hong Kong
New constituency	Member of Legislative Council; Representative for Election Committee; 1995–1997	Replaced by Provisional Legislative Council
New parliament	Member of Provisional Legislative Council; 1997–1998	Replaced by Legislative Council
Preceded by Tang Siu-tong as Representative for Regional Council	Member of Legislative Council; Representative for District Council; 2000–2004	Succeeded by Lau Wong-fat
Preceded by Lau Wong-fat	Member of Legislative Council; Representative for District Council; 2008–2012	Succeeded by Himself as Representative for District Council (First)
Preceded by Himself as Representative for District Council	Member of Legislative Council; Representative for District Council (First); 2012–present	Succeeded by Lau Kwok-fan
Political offices
Preceded by Starry Lee	Non-official Member of Executive Council; 2016–2022	Succeeded by Gary Chan
