= 1999 North District Council election =

Hong Kong local election

- 28 November 1999

16 (of the 25) seats to North District Council 13 seats needed for a majority
- Turnout: 40.0%
	First party	Second party
Party	Democratic	DAB
Last election	2 seats, 23.2%	4 seats, 27.9%
Seats before	2	4
Seats won	7	6
Seat change	▲5	▲2
Popular vote	12,070	17,126
Percentage	27.9%	39.6%
Swing	▲4.7%	▲11.5%
- Colours on map indicate winning party for each constituency.

The 1999 North District Council election was held on 28 November 1999 to elect all 16 elected members to the 25-member District Council.

== Overall election results ==
Before election:

↓
2	9
Pro-dem	Pro-Beijing

Change in composition:

↓
8	8
Pro-democracy	Pro-Beijing

North Council election result 1999
Party	Seats	Gains	Losses	Net gain/loss	Seats %	Votes %	Votes	+/−
DAB	6	3	2	+1	27.5	39.6	17,126	+11.5
Independent	3	2	3	−1	25.0	31.4	13,589	
Democratic	7	5	0	+5	50.0	27.9	12,070	+4.7
