= 2015 North District Council election =

Hong Kong local election

- 22 November 2015

18 (of the 20) seats to North District Council 11 seats needed for a majority
- Turnout: 45.6%
	First party	Second party
Party	DAB	Democratic
Last election	14 seats, 50.1%	1 seat, 22.6%
Seats before	10	1
Seats won	8	3
Seat change	▼2	▲2
Popular vote	16,692	9,356
Percentage	31.2%	17.5%
Swing	▼18.9%	▼5.1%
	Third party	Fourth party
Party	FTU	Neo Democrats
Last election	Did not run	Did not run
Seats before	3	0
Seats won	3	1
Seat change	Steady	▲1
Popular vote	4,141	2,660
Percentage	7.7%	5.0%
Swing	N/A	N/A
- Colours on map indicate winning party for each constituency.

The 2015 North District Council election was held on 22 November 2015 to elect all 18 elected members to the 20-member North District Council of Hong Kong.

== Overall election results ==
Before election:

↓
1	16
PD	Pro-Beijing

Change in composition:

↓
4	14
Pro-dem	Pro-Beijing

North Council election result 2015
Party	Seats	Gains	Losses	Net gain/loss	Seats %	Votes %	Votes	+/−
DAB	8	2	4	–2	44.4	31.2	16,692	–18.9
Independent	3	2	0	+1	16.7	28.4	15,209	
Democratic	3	2	0	+2	16.7	17.5	9,356	−5.1
FTU	3	0	0	0	16.7	7.7	4,141	
Neo Democrats	1	1	0	+1	5.6	5.0	2,660	
Third Side	0	0	0	0	0	3.4	1,818	
NOTR	0	0	0	0	0	3.2	1,710	
Liberal	0	0	0	0	0	2.0	1,085	−1.3
Civic Passion	0	0	0	0	0	1.5	797	
