= Lau Kwok-fan =

Hong Kong politician

The Honourable Lau Kwok-fan MH, JP
- 劉國勳
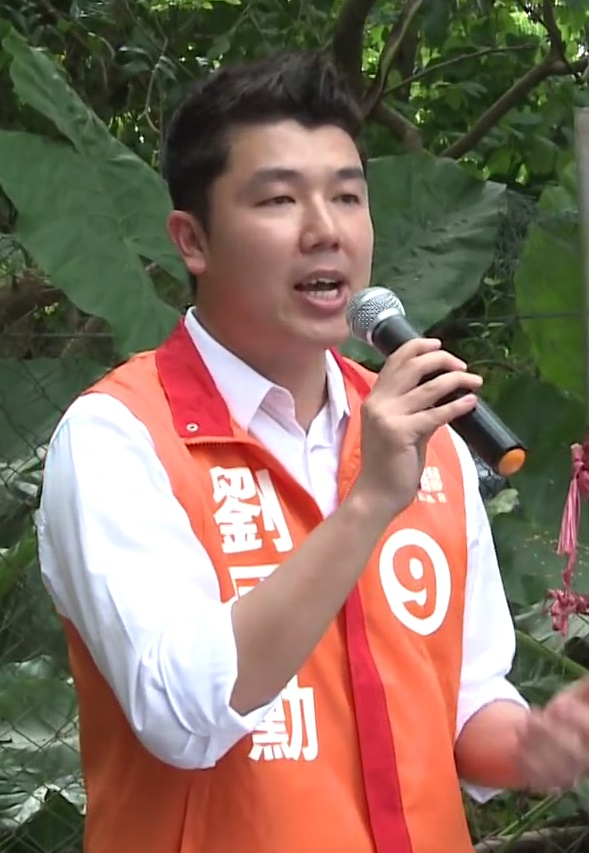
- Lau during the 2012 Legislative Council election

Member of the Legislative Council
- Incumbent
- Assumed office 1 January 2022
- Preceded by: New constituency
- Constituency: New Territories North
- In office 1 October 2016 – 31 December 2021
- Preceded by: Ip Kwok-him
- Succeeded by: Constituency abolished
- Constituency: District Council

Member of the North District Council
- In office 1 January 2008 – 31 December 2019
- Preceded by: Adrian Lau Tak-cheong
- Succeeded by: Lam Shuk-ching
- Constituency: Yan Shing

Personal details
- Born: 28 June 1981 (age 45) Hong Kong
- Party: Democratic Alliance for the Betterment and Progress of Hong Kong
- Spouse: Lui Dik-ming (m. 2012; died 2026)
- Education: Chinese University of Hong Kong
- Occupation: District councillor

Edward Lau Kwok-fan, MH, JP (Chinese: 劉國勳; born 28 June 1981) is a Hong Kong politician. He is the member of the executive committee of the Democratic Alliance for the Betterment and Progress of Hong Kong (DAB) and former member of the North District Council, representing Yan Shing until 2019. In the 2016 Hong Kong Legislative Council election, he succeeded DAB veteran legislator Ip Kwok-him in the District Council (First) functional constituency to the Legislative Council of Hong Kong.

== Biography ==
Lau was born in 1981 and graduated from the Chinese University of Hong Kong with a master's degree in sociology. He joined the Democratic Alliance for the Betterment of Hong Kong (DAB), the largest pro-Beijing party in 2002. He became a member of the party's executive committee in 2009.

He first contested in the 2003 District Council election in Yan Shing for the North District Council. In the 2007 District Council election, he ran again in the Yan Shing and won and defeated Adrian Lau Tak-cheong by receiving 4,159 votes, the second highest votes in Hong Kong. He was re-elected for two more terms in 2011 and 2015. He lost his seat in 2019 following a rout of pro-Beijing candidates amidst the 2019–20 Hong Kong protests.

He was elected in the 2011 Election Committee subsector election through the New Territories District Council subsector to the Election Committee, which was responsible for electing Chief Executive election in 2012. In the 2012 Legislative Council election, Lau stood in the second place of the Chan Hak-kan's DAB ticket. Chan's list eventually received more than 40,000 votes with Chan being returned to the Legislative Council.

He was appointed to the Urban Renewal Authority Appeal Board Panel and the Council for Sustainable Development in 2013 and 2015 respectively.

In the 2016 Hong Kong Legislative Council election, he defeated three other party members in a four-way intra-party primary to take up Ip Kwok-him's District Council (First) functional constituency in the Legislative Council of Hong Kong. He was elected to the Legislative Council unopposed.

In January 2021, the DAB proposed that committees monitor whether district councillors are fulfilling the oath of loyalty to the government, as ordered by the Civil Service Bureau. Lau claimed that since district councils are majority pro-democracy, they have been slow to hand out money, and district councillors should be stripped of their power to allocate public funds. In addition, Lau claimed that "The district councils, over the past year, have lost their function as a consultative body and become a platform for the opposition camp to smear the central and the local governments."

In December 2022, Lau was part of 3 lawmakers who drafted legislation to reform CUHK's governing council, saying "During the anti-government turmoil in 2019, there was a riot on the campus of CUHK but the attitude and handling of the incident by CUHK were appalling."

In September 2023, Lau drew criticism after he helped push a bill to revamp Chinese University's governing council without the school's endorsement, with former lawmaker Abraham Shek asking "They should table the bill with the university’s endorsement. Why do they have to be that authoritarian?"

== Personal life ==
In August 2022, Lau tested positive for COVID-19.

Political offices
Preceded by Adrian Lau	Member of North District Council; Representative for Yan Shing; 2008–2019	Succeeded by Lam Shuk-ching
Legislative Council of Hong Kong
Preceded by Ip Kwok-him	Member of Legislative Council; Representative for District Council; 2016–2021	Constituency abolished
New constituency	Member of Legislative Council; Representative for New Territories North; 2022–present	Incumbent
Order of precedence
Preceded by Luk Chung-hung; Member of the Legislative Council	Hong Kong order of precedence Member of the Legislative Council	Succeeded by Cheng Chung-tai; Member of the Legislative Council
