= New Progressive Alliance =

New Progressive Alliance 新進步聯盟
- Chairman: Hau Chi-keung
- Vice-Chairman: Leung Fuk-yuen
- Founded: 25 April 2016 (Originally)
- Ideology: Conservatism
- Political position: Centre-right
- Regional affiliation: Pro-Beijing camp
- Colours: Red

New Progressive Alliance (Chinese: 新進步聯盟; NPA) is a proposed conservative political party led by New Territories rural leaders Hau Chi-keung and Leung Fuk-yuen planned to establish on 25 April 2016. However, the plan was shelved due to not gaining approval from the Companies Registry. It is led by Hau Chi-keung, an ex officio member of the Heung Yee Kuk and chairman of the Sheung Shui Rural Committee.

== Background ==
The Heung Yee Kuk, a government-recognised advisory body representing the interests of indigenous villagers had been a powerful pro-Beijing organ playing a key role in mobilising villagers to support pro-government candidates. However governed by the Heung Yee Kuk Ordinance, it cannot itself transform into a political party. In the early 2010s, tensions between the Kuk and the government erupted over the Small House Policy and town planning issues that restrict village development, including the landfill development in Tuen Mun. The rural leaders also grew dissatisfied with their pro-Beijing allies, with some asserting that they had not always spoken up for their villagers’ interests.

Since late 2015, Bowie Hau Chi-keung, an ex officio member of the Heung Yee Kuk and chairman of the Sheung Shui Rural Committee had planned of setting up a new party for the indigenous interests. The name of the proposed party was originally called New Territories Progressive Alliance, but was later changed to New Progressive Alliance in order to target the territory-wide constituents. The idea of establishing the party met opposition from 15 of the 27 rural committees led by Sha Tin Rural Committee chairman Mok Kam-kwai and mainly from the outlying islands and southern New Territories, who worried about the new party trying to hijack the Heung Yee Kuk.

== See also ==
- Federation for the Stability of Hong Kong
