= 2003 North District Council election =

Hong Kong local election

- 23 November 2003

16 (of the 25) seats to North District Council 13 seats needed for a majority
- Turnout: 44.6%
	First party	Second party
Party	Democratic	DAB
Last election	7 seats, 27.9%	6 seats, 39.6%
Seats before	7	6
Seats won	8	5
Seat change	▲1	▼1
Popular vote	19,867	16,545
Percentage	40.7%	33.9%
Swing	▲2.8%	▼5.7%
- Colours on map indicate winning party for each constituency.

The 2003 North District Council election was held on 23 November 2003 to elect all 16 elected members to the 25-member District Council.

== Overall election results ==
Before election:

↓
8	8
Pro-democracy	Pro-Beijing

Change in composition:

↓
10	6
Pro-democracy	Pro-Beijing

North Council election result 2003
Party	Seats	Gains	Losses	Net gain/loss	Seats %	Votes %	Votes	+/−
Democratic	8	1	0	+1	50.0	40.7	19,867	+2.8
DAB	5	1	2	−1	31.3	33.9	16,545	−5.7
Independent	3	1	1	0	18.8	24.0	11,708	
Liberal	0	0	0	0	0	1.4	704	+1.0
