= District Council (First) functional constituency =

District Council (First) 區議會（第一）
- Former Functional constituency for the Legislative Council of Hong Kong
- Country: Hong Kong
- Electorate: 452 (2020)

Former constituency
- Created: 2000
- Abolished: 2021
- Number of members: One
- Created from: Regional Council and Urban Council
- Replaced by: HKSAR Deputies to the National People's Congress, HKSAR Members of the National Committee of the Chinese People's Political Consultative Conference, and Representatives of Relevant National Organisations

The District Council (First) functional constituency (Chinese: 區議會（第一）功能界別), formerly called District Council until 2012, was a functional constituency in the elections for the Legislative Council of Hong Kong. Its electorate consists of all 431 directly elected members (excluding the 27 ex officio seats held by chairpersons of rural committees) of the 18 District Councils of Hong Kong. Along with Catering, it was created in 2000 to replace the Urban Council and Regional Council constituencies after the councils were abolished. This constituency was abolished in 2021.

== Members returned ==
Election	Member	Party	Votes	%
2000	Ip Kwok-him	DAB	198	58.41
2004	Lau Wong-fat	Liberal	267	61.24
2008	Ip Kwok-him	DAB	259	65.40
2012	Ip Kwok-him	DAB	N/A	
2016	Lau Kwok-fan	DAB	N/A	

== Election results ==
=== 2010s ===
2016 Hong Kong legislative election: District Council (First)
Party	Candidate	Votes	%	±%
DAB	Lau Kwok-fan	Unopposed		
Registered electors		431		
DAB hold		Swing		

2012 Hong Kong legislative election: District Council (First)
Party	Candidate	Votes	%	±%
DAB	Ip Kwok-him	Unopposed		
Registered electors		410		
DAB hold		Swing		

=== 2000s ===
2008 Hong Kong legislative election: District Council
Party	Candidate	Votes	%	±%
DAB	Ip Kwok-him	259	65.40	
Nonpartisan	Lam Wai-keung	137	34.60	
Majority		122	30.80	
Total valid votes		396	100.00	
Rejected ballots		13		
Turnout		409	95.56	
Registered electors		428		
DAB gain from Liberal		Swing		

2004 Hong Kong legislative election: District Council
Party	Candidate	Votes	%	±%
Liberal	Lau Wong-fat	267	61.24	+2.83
Democratic	Cosmas Kwong Kwok-chuen	126	28.90	
Nonpartisan	Au Chi-yuen	43	9.86	
Majority		141	32.34	
Total valid votes		436	100.00	
Rejected ballots		12		
Turnout		448	96.97	
Registered electors		462		
Liberal gain from DAB		Swing		

2000 Hong Kong legislative election: District Council
Party	Candidate	Votes	%	±%
DAB	Ip Kwok-him	198	58.41	
Liberal	Chiang Sai-cheong	141	41.59	
Majority		57	16.82	
Total valid votes		339	100.00	
Rejected ballots		15		
Turnout		354	93.65	
Registered electors		378		
DAB win (new seat)				
