= Gary Chan =

Hong Kong politician (born 1976)

The Honourable Gary Chan Hak-kan BBS, JP
- 陳克勤
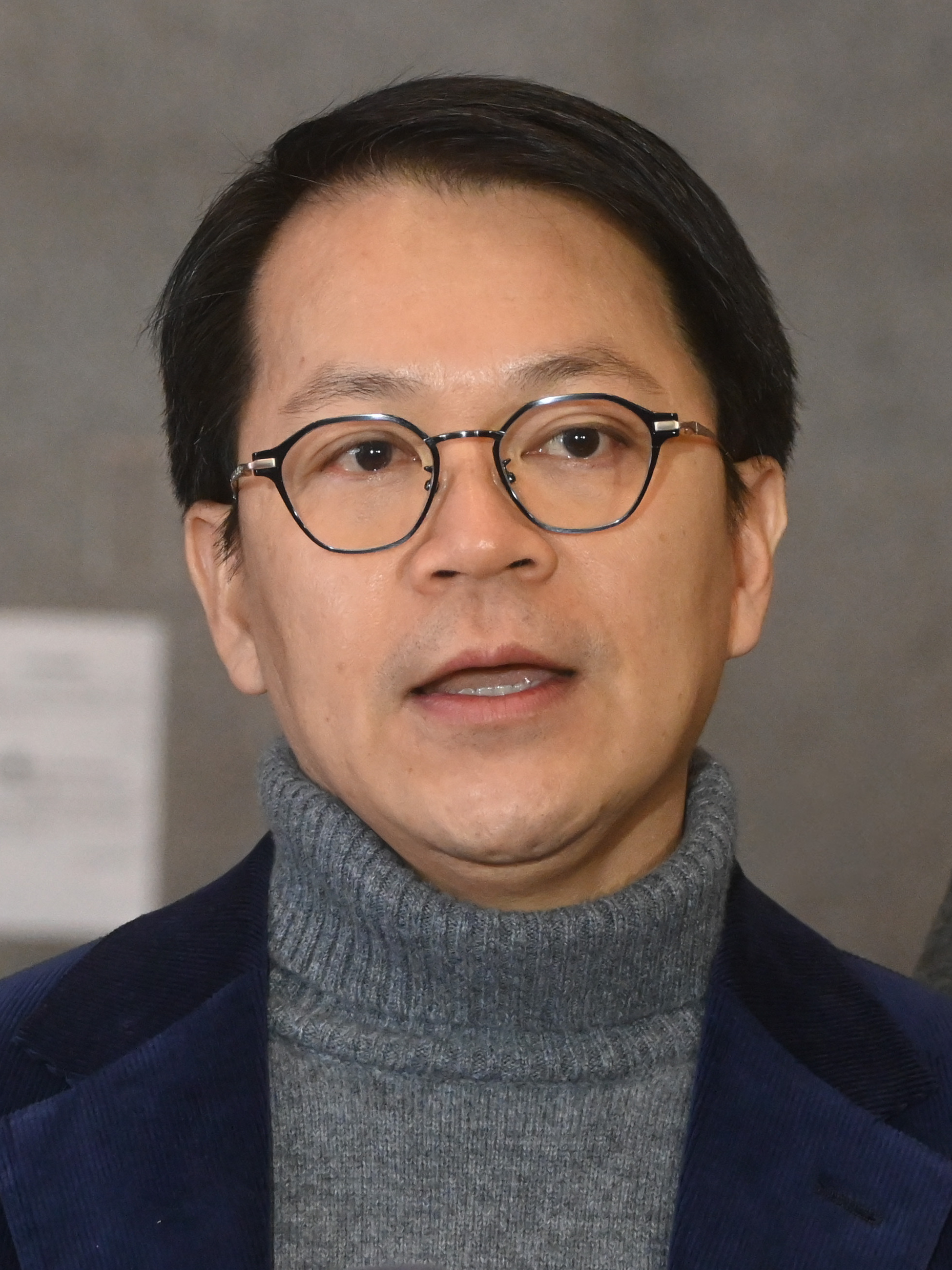
- Chan in 2025

Chairman of the Democratic Alliance for the Betterment and Progress of Hong Kong
- Incumbent
- Assumed office 25 September 2023
- Preceded by: Starry Lee

Member of the Legislative Council
- Incumbent
- Assumed office 1 January 2022
- Preceded by: New constituency
- Constituency: New Territories North East
- In office 1 October 2008 – 31 December 2021
- Preceded by: Li Kwok-ying
- Succeeded by: Constituency abolished
- Constituency: New Territories East

Personal details
- Born: 24 April 1976 (age 50) Fujian, China
- Party: Democratic Alliance for the Betterment and Progress of Hong Kong; New Territories Association of Societies
- Education: Syracuse University; Chinese University of Hong Kong (BSS)
- Occupation: Legislative Councillor

Gary Chan
- Traditional Chinese: 陳克勤
- Simplified Chinese: 陈克勤
Transcriptions
Standard Mandarin
- Hanyu Pinyin: Chén Kèqíng
Yue: Cantonese
- Yale Romanization: Chàhn Hāk kàhn
- Jyutping: Can^{4} Hak^{1} kan^{4}

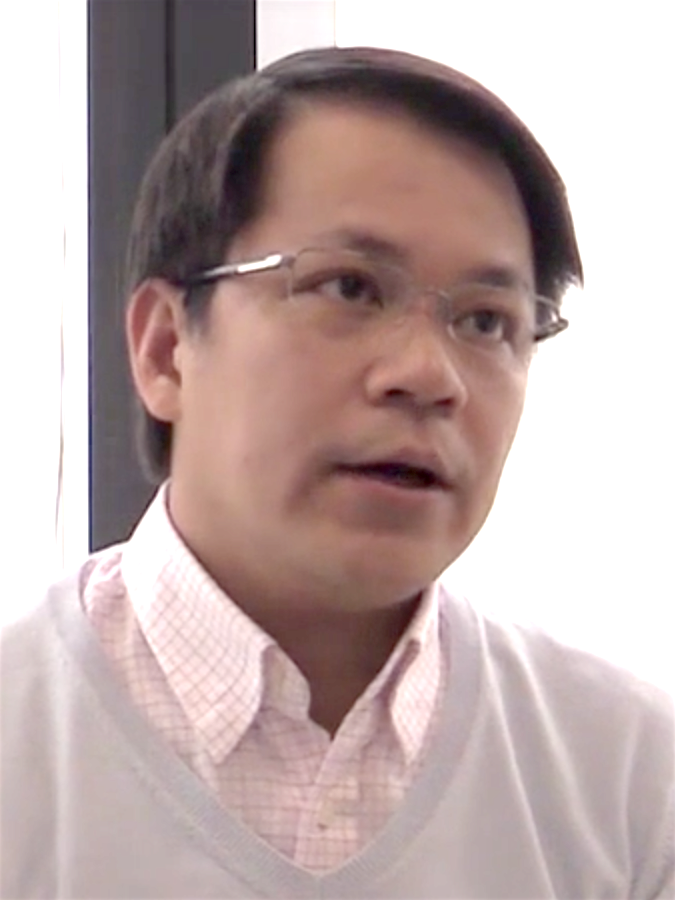
Chan in c. 2016

Gary Chan Hak-kan (born 24 April 1976) is a Hong Kong politician who serves as a member of the Legislative Council of Hong Kong since 2008. He represents the New Territories North East constituency and is the current chairperson of the Democratic Alliance for the Betterment and Progress of Hong Kong (DAB) political party.

== Biography ==
Chan was born in Xiamen, Fujian, People's Republic of China. He graduated from the Department of Government and Public Administration at the Chinese University of Hong Kong, and studied in the Maxwell School of Citizenship and Public Affairs, Syracuse University. He was a member of Sha Tin District Council from 1999 to 2003. He was appointed special assistant to the Chief Executive of Hong Kong, Sir Donald Tsang, from 2006 to 2008.

In 2008, Chan followed Lau Kong Wah in running to represent New Territories East constituency in the Legislative Council elections after resigning as special assistant to the Chief Executive. With about 100,000 votes for their party list, both Chan and Lau were declared elected.

Shortly after the election results were announced, Chan was widely ridiculed for his poor English. He is quoted as saying in response to a reporter's question that the DAB would "try our breast ... to improve people's living hood [sic]".

In 2010, Chan voted to build a cemetery near the mainland China border, but in 2021, became vigorously opposed to it.

In February 2021, Chan supported a maximum length of hair for prisoners in Hong Kong, claiming that "If prisoners have long hair, they can hide small blades or weapons in their hair and that could threaten the safety of correctional officers or other inmates ... Discipline is needed in jail."

In December 2021, Chan was re-elected through New Territories North East constituency with 62,855 votes.

In January 2022, Chan did not raise his right hand when taking the oath while being sworn in as a legislative councillor.

In October 2022, Chan said he was disappointed that Article 23 security legislation was pushed back and not part of any plan to be introduced in 2022, saying that the national security law was "incomplete."

On 16 October 2022, Chan said that housing in Hong Kong could be solved, saying "It's the same in Hong Kong.. The land and housing problem and the gap between the rich and poor are not unsolvable, as long as the SAR government puts in the work and Hong Kong people are united.

On 25 September 2023, Chan was elected as the chairman of DAB, succeeding Starry Lee.

In December 2025, Chan was re-elected again through New Territories North East constituency with 41,612 votes.

== Controversies ==
=== Urine inspection ===
In a pre-election debate on 2008, Chan proposed to impose mandatory drug tests on teenagers returning from Mainland China, so as to fight against the abuse of narcotics by them. The plan was criticised as abusing human rights.

=== Libel ===
In another pre-election debate on 2008, Chan questioned Leung Kwok-hung regarding his "one-minute attendance" in each LegCo meeting. Leung denied the accusation and considered it a libel on him. He replied with the fact that he had over 95% attendance and asked for an apology.

Political offices
New constituency	Member of Sha Tin District Council; Representative for Kam Fung; 2000–2003	Constituency abolished
Preceded by Ip Kwok-him	Non-official Member of Executive Council; 2022–present	Incumbent
Government offices
New office	Special Assistant of Chief Executive Office; 2006–2008	Vacant Title next held by Ronald Chan
Legislative Council of Hong Kong
Preceded by Li Kwok-ying	Member of Legislative Council; Representative for New Territories East; 2008–2021	Constituency abolished
New constituency	Member of Legislative Council; Representative for New Territories North East; 2022–present	Incumbent
Party political offices
Preceded by Starry Lee	Chairman of Democratic Alliance for the Betterment and Progress of Hong Kong; 2023–present	Incumbent
Order of precedence
Preceded by Starry Lee; Member of the Legislative Council	Hong Kong order of precedence Member of the Legislative Council	Succeeded by Chan Kin-por; Member of the Legislative Council
