= 2011 North District Council election =

Hong Kong local election

- 6 November 2011

17 (of the 24) seats to North District Council 13 seats needed for a majority
- Turnout: 43.2%
	First party	Second party
Party	DAB	Democratic
Last election	9 seats, 47.6%	4 seats, 28.6%
Seats before	9	4
Seats won	14	1
Seat change	▲5	▼3
Popular vote	34,473	15,573
Percentage	50.1%	22.6%
Swing	▲2.5%	▼6.0%
- Colours on map indicate winning party for each constituency.

The 2011 North District Council election was held on 6 November 2011 to elect all 17 elected members to the 24-member District Council. The Beijing loyalist party Democratic Alliance for the Betterment and Progress of Hong Kong (DAB) won the majority of the seats by claiming 14 seats, while the Democratic Party, the pan-democrat flagship party, lost 3 seats and retained only one seat in Luen Wo Hui.

== Overall election results ==
Before election:

↓
4	12
Pro-dem	Pro-Beijing

Change in composition:

↓
1	16
PD	Pro-Beijing

North Council election result 2011
Party	Seats	Gains	Losses	Net gain/loss	Seats %	Votes %	Votes	+/−
DAB	14	5	0	+5	82.4	50.1	34,473	+2.5
Independent	2	0	1	−1	11.8	25.1	17,299	
Democratic	1	0	3	−3	5.9	22.6	15,573	−6.0
People Power	0	0	0	0	0	1.4	960	
Liberal	0	0	0	0	0	0.7	506	−1.2
