= North District Council =

Hong Kong district council

Coordinates: 22.4946°N 114.1386°E

North District Council 北區區議會

Type
- Type: Hong Kong District Council of the North District, Hong Kong

History
- Founded: 1 April 1981 (District Board); 1 July 1997 (Provisional); 1 January 2000 (District Council)

Leadership
- Chair: Derek Lai Chi-kin, Independent
- Vice-Chair: Vacant

Structure
- Seats: 24 councillors consisting of 4 elected members 8 district committee members 8 appointed members 4 ex officio members
- DAB: 11 / 24
- FTU: 1 / 24
- BPA: 1 / 24
- FEW: 1 / 24
- Independent: 10 / 24

Elections
- Voting system: First past the post
- Last election: 10 December 2023

Meeting place
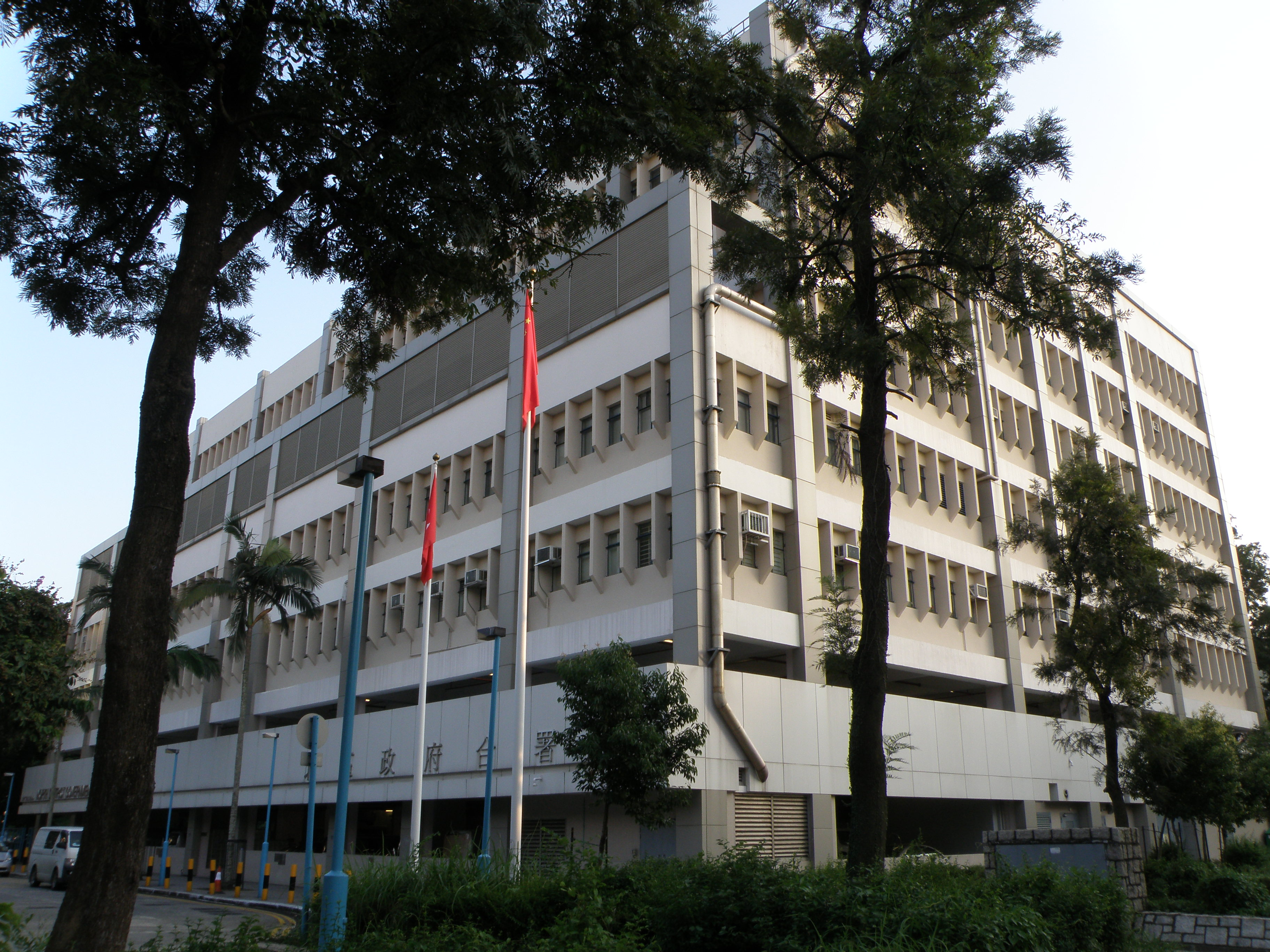
- 3/F, North District Government Offices, 3 Pik Fung Road, Fanling, New Territories

Website
- www.districtcouncils.gov.hk/north/

The North District Council (Chinese: 北區區議會) is one of the 18 Hong Kong district councils and represents the North District. It is one of 18 such councils. Consisting of 24 members, the district council is drawn from two constituencies, which elect 4 members, along with 8 district committee members, 8 appointed members, and four ex officio members who are the Ta Kwu Ling, Sheung Shui, Sha Tau Kok and Fanling rural committee chairmen. The latest election was held on 10 December 2023.

== History ==
The North District Council was established on 1 April 1981 under the name of the North District Board as the result of the colonial Governor Murray MacLehose's District Administration Scheme reform. The District Board was partly elected with the ex-officio Regional Council members and chairmen of four Rural Committees, Ta Kwu Ling, Sheung Shui, Sha Tau Kok and Fanling, as well as members appointed by the Governor until 1994 when last the Governor Chris Patten refrained from appointing any member.

The North District Board became the North Provisional District Board after the Hong Kong Special Administrative Region (HKSAR) was established in 1997 with the appointment system being reintroduced by Chief Executive Tung Chee-hwa. The current North District Council was established on 1 January 2000 after the first District Council election in 1999. The appointed seats were abolished in 2015 after the modified constitutional reform proposal was passed by the Legislative Council in 2010.

The North District Council is dominated by the rural forces and the pro-Beijing camp. The rural forces had been in control of the chairmanship until 2008 when long-time councilor So Sai-chi of the Democratic Alliance for the Betterment and Progress of Hong Kong (DAB) became the council chairman. The DAB achieved a majority of the seats in the 2011 District Council election, taking 14 of the 17 elected seats of the council. The DAB majority ended when the Hong Kong Federation of Trade Unions (FTU) councilors departed from the DAB in 2012.

The pro-democrats had established their presence in the late 1980s with Tik Chi-yuen and Wong Sing-chi of Meeting Point elected in the 1988 and 1991 elections. Both of them became the Legislative Councillors for the Democratic Party. The pro-democrats achieved the majority of the elected seats in the 2003 tide of democracy following the 2003 July 1 March, but suffered setbacks in the 2007 and 2011 elections. In the 2011 election, the pro-democrats won only one seat, occupied by the Democratic Party's Law Sai-yan in Luen Wo Hui. The pro-democrats regained several seats in 2015, with Democratic Party chief executive Lam Cheuk-ting won in Shek Wu Hui and was elected to the Legislative Council in the next year.

In the 2019 election, the pro-democrats took control of the council by taking 15 seats in a historic landslide victory amid the massive pro-democracy protests. The pro-Beijing parties almost lost all their seats, retaining only three seats with DAB's Lau Kwok-fan, the legislator for the District Council (First) functional constituency also being unseated. As a result, the newly elected Law Ting-tak became the first localist to be elected as council chairman for the first time.

In the 2023 District Council election, 4 of the 24 seats in the North District Council will be elected by elected members, 8 seats will be elected by the district committees, 8 appointed members, and 4 ex-officio members will make up the current North District District Council. In the Parliament, among the 24 seats, there are 10 independent members, 11 seats from the Democratic Alliance for the Betterment of Hong Kong, 1 seat from the Federation of Trade Unions, 1 seat from the Economic and Democratic Alliance, and 1 seat from the Public Housing Federation. Among the 24 seats, 24 are from the pro-establishment camp.

== Political control ==
Since 1982 political control of the council has been held by the following parties:

| Camp in control | Largest party | Years | Composition |
|---|---|---|---|
| No Overall Control | None | 1982 - 1985 | |
| Pro-government | None | 1985 - 1988 | |
| Pro-government | Meeting Point | 1988 - 1991 | |
| Pro-government | Meeting Point | 1991 - 1994 | |
| Pro-Beijing | DAB | 1994 - 1997 | |
| Pro-Beijing | DAB | 1997 - 1999 | |
| Pro-Beijing | Democratic | 2000 - 2003 | |
| Pro-Beijing | Democratic | 2004 - 2007 | |
| Pro-Beijing | DAB | 2008 - 2011 | |
| Pro-Beijing | DAB (majority) | 2012 - 2015 | |
| Pro-Beijing | DAB | 2016 - 2019 | |
| Pro-democracy → Pro-Beijing | Democratic | 2020 - 2023 | |
| Pro-Beijing | DAB | 2024 - 2027 | |

== Political makeup ==

Elections are held every four years.

| Political party | Council members | | | | | | | Current members |
| Political party | 1994 | 1999 | 2003 | 2007 | 2011 | 2015 | 2019 | Current members |
|---|---|---|---|---|---|---|---|---|
| Independent | 5 | 2 | 3 | 3 | 2 | 3 | 8 | 13 / 22 |
| Democratic | 2 | 7 | 8 | 4 | 1 | 3 | 5 | 4 / 22 |
| DAB | 4 | 6 | 5 | 9 | 14 | 8 | 1 | 1 / 22 |
| FTU | - | - | - | - | - | 3 | 1 | 1 / 22 |

== District result maps ==
1994

1999

2003

2007

2011

2015

2019

== Members represented ==
| Capacity | Code | Constituency | Name | Political affiliation | Term | | Notes |
|---|---|---|---|---|---|---|---|
| Elected | N01 | Wu Tip Shan | Yiu Ming | DAB | 1 January 2024 | Incumbent | |
| Elected | N01 | Wu Tip Shan | Sung Ping-ping | Independent | 1 January 2024 | Incumbent | |
| Elected | N02 | Robin's Nest | Ko Wai-kei | DAB | 1 January 2024 | Incumbent | |
| Elected | N02 | Robin's Nest | Ken Tsang King-chung | FTU | 1 January 2024 | Incumbent | |
| District Committees | | | Lau Chun-hoi | DAB | 1 January 2024 | Incumbent | |
| District Committees | | | Sherwood Ng Yiu-cho | DAB | 1 January 2024 | Incumbent | |
| District Committees | | | Ray Hau Hon-shek | DAB | 1 January 2024 | Incumbent | |
| District Committees | | | Wu King-pang | DAB | 1 January 2024 | Incumbent | |
| District Committees | | | Phillip Tsang Hing-lung | DAB | 1 January 2024 | Incumbent | |
| District Committees | | | Pun Hau-man | DAB | 1 January 2024 | Incumbent | |
| District Committees | | | Windy Or Sin-yi | DAB | 1 January 2024 | Incumbent | |
| District Committees | | | Warwick Wan Wo-tat | Independent | 1 January 2024 | Incumbent | |
| Appointed | | | Chu Ho-yin | DAB | 1 January 2024 | Incumbent | |
| Appointed | | | Wan Wo-fai | DAB | 1 January 2024 | Incumbent | |
| Appointed | | | Lai Sum | DAB | 1 January 2024 | Incumbent | |
| Appointed | | | Zinnie Chow Tin-yi | BPA | 1 January 2024 | Incumbent | |
| Appointed | | | Chu Wai-lam | FEW | 1 January 2024 | Incumbent | |
| Appointed | | | Tommy Hung Chi-fu | Independent | 1 January 2024 | Incumbent | |
| Appointed | | | Henry Liu Yu-hin | Independent | 1 January 2024 | Incumbent | |
| Appointed | | | Tam Chun-kwok | Independent | 1 January 2024 | Incumbent | |
| Ex officio | | Ta Kwu Ling Rural Committee Chairman | Chan Yuet-ming | Independent | 1 January 2024 | Incumbent | |
| Ex officio | | Sheung Shui Rural Committee Chairman | Hau Chi-keung | Independent | 1 January 2024 | Incumbent | |
| Ex officio | | Sha Tau Kok Rural Committee Chairman | Lee Koon-hung | Independent | 1 January 2024 | Incumbent | |
| Ex officio | | Fanling Rural Committee Chairman | Li Kwok-fung | Independent | 1 January 2024 | Incumbent | |

== Leadership ==
=== Chairs ===
Since 1985, the chairman is elected by all the members of the board:

| Chairman | Years | Political Affiliation |
|---|---|---|
| P.E. Johnson | 1981–1982 | District Officer |
| S. Harbinson | 1982–1984 | District Officer |
| I. Wotherspoon | 1984–1985 | District Officer |
| Raymond Pang Hang-yin | 1985–1994 | Heung Yee Kuk→LDF |
| Tang Kwok-yung | 1994–1999 | Heung Yee Kuk |
| Raymond Pang Hang-yin | 1999–2003 | Heung Yee Kuk |
| Li Kwok-fung | 2004–2006 | Heung Yee Kuk |
| Lau Tin-sang | 2006–2007 | Heung Yee Kuk |
| So Sai-chi | 2008–2019 | DAB |
| Law Ting-tak | 2020–2023 | Independent |
| Derek Lai Chi-kin | 2024–present | District Officer |

=== Vice Chairs ===
| Vice Chairman | Years | Political Affiliation |
|---|---|---|
| Cheung Fo-tai | 2000–2003 | Heung Yee Kuk |
| Chow Kam-siu | 2004–2007 | Democratic |
| Hau Chi-keung | 2008–2011 | Liberal/Heung Yee Kuk |
| Hau Kam-lam | 2012–2015 | DAB/Heung Yee Kuk |
| Li Kwok-fung | 2016–2019 | Heung Yee Kuk |
| Chan Yuk-ming | 2020–2021 | Democratic |
| Li Kwok-fung | 2021–2023 | Heung Yee Kuk |
