= SPW =

SPW may refer to:

== Codes ==
- SPW, the IATA code for Spencer Municipal Airport, a public airport in Spencer, Iowa, United States
- SPW, the MTR station code for Shui Pin Wai stop, Hong Kong
- SPW, the SAME code for a shelter-in-place warning

== Education ==
- St Peter's Woodlands Grammar School, Adelaide, Australia
- Students Partnership Worldwide, an international development charity specialising in youth-to-youth education, renamed Restless Development

== Organisations ==
- Single Parents Wellbeing, a Welsh organisation
- Socialist Party of Washington, a state affiliate of the Socialist Party of America established in 1901

== Other uses ==
- The Schützenpanzerwagen, Sd.Kfz. 251, an armoured fighting vehicle built by Germany during World War II
- Semi Precious Weapons, an American glam rock band
- Singapore Pro Wrestling, the first professional wrestling promotion in Singapore
- South Pole Wall, a massive cosmic structure formed by a giant wall of galaxies
