= Shui Pin Tsuen =

Village in Hong Kong

Coordinates: 22.443953°N 114.02071°E

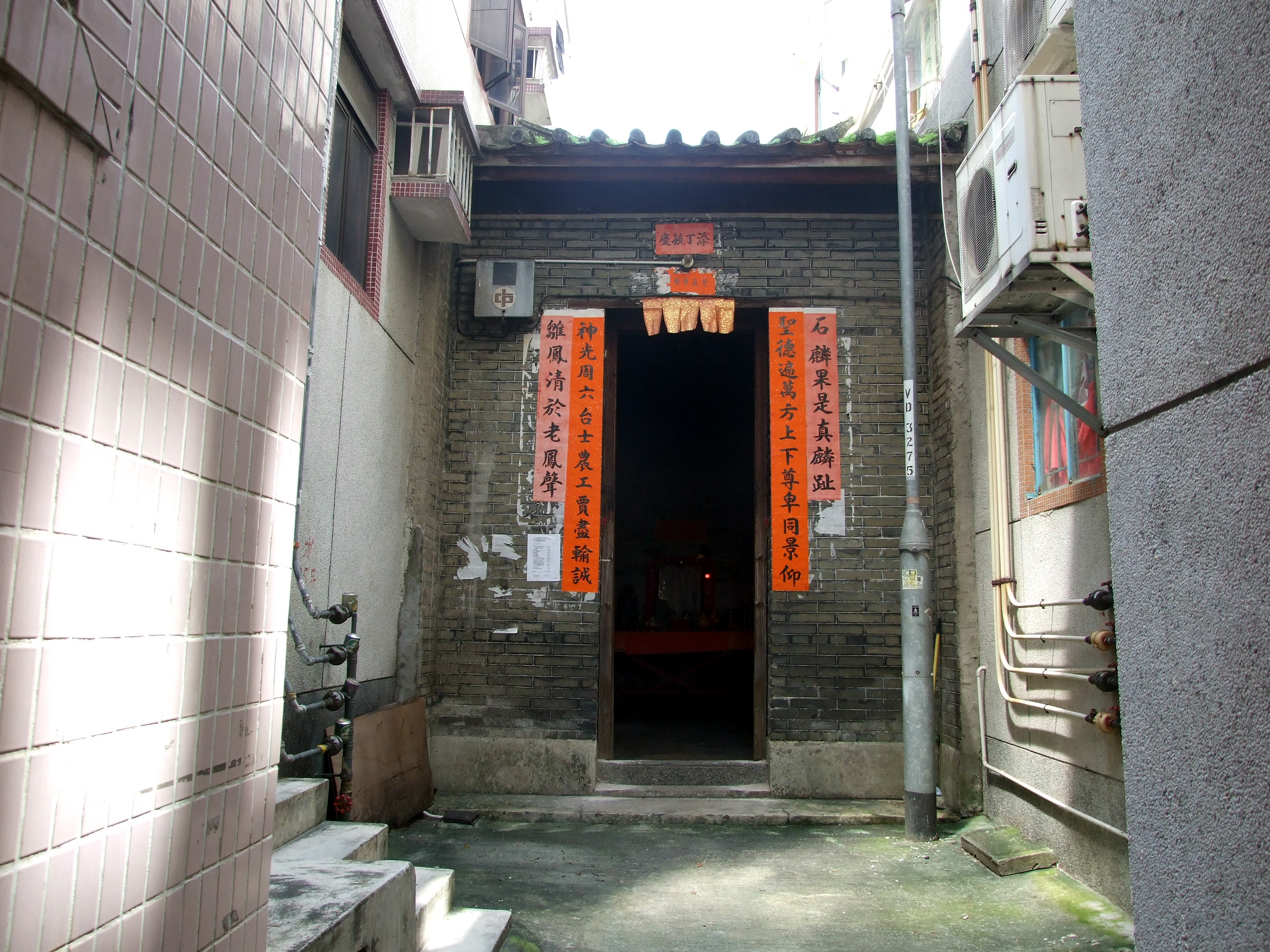
Village shrine of Shui Pin Tsuen.

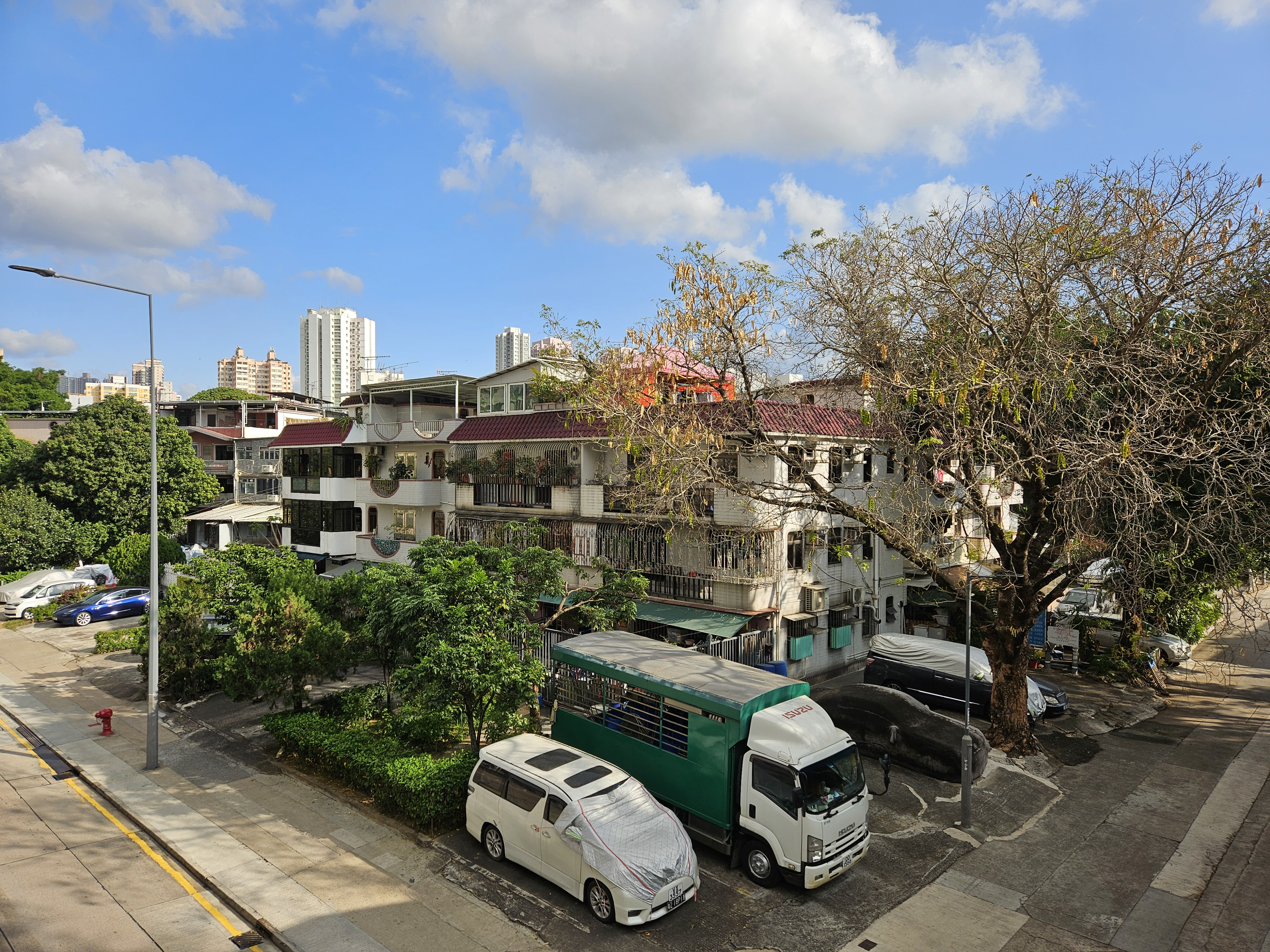
View of Shui Pin Tsuen from Castle Peak Road.

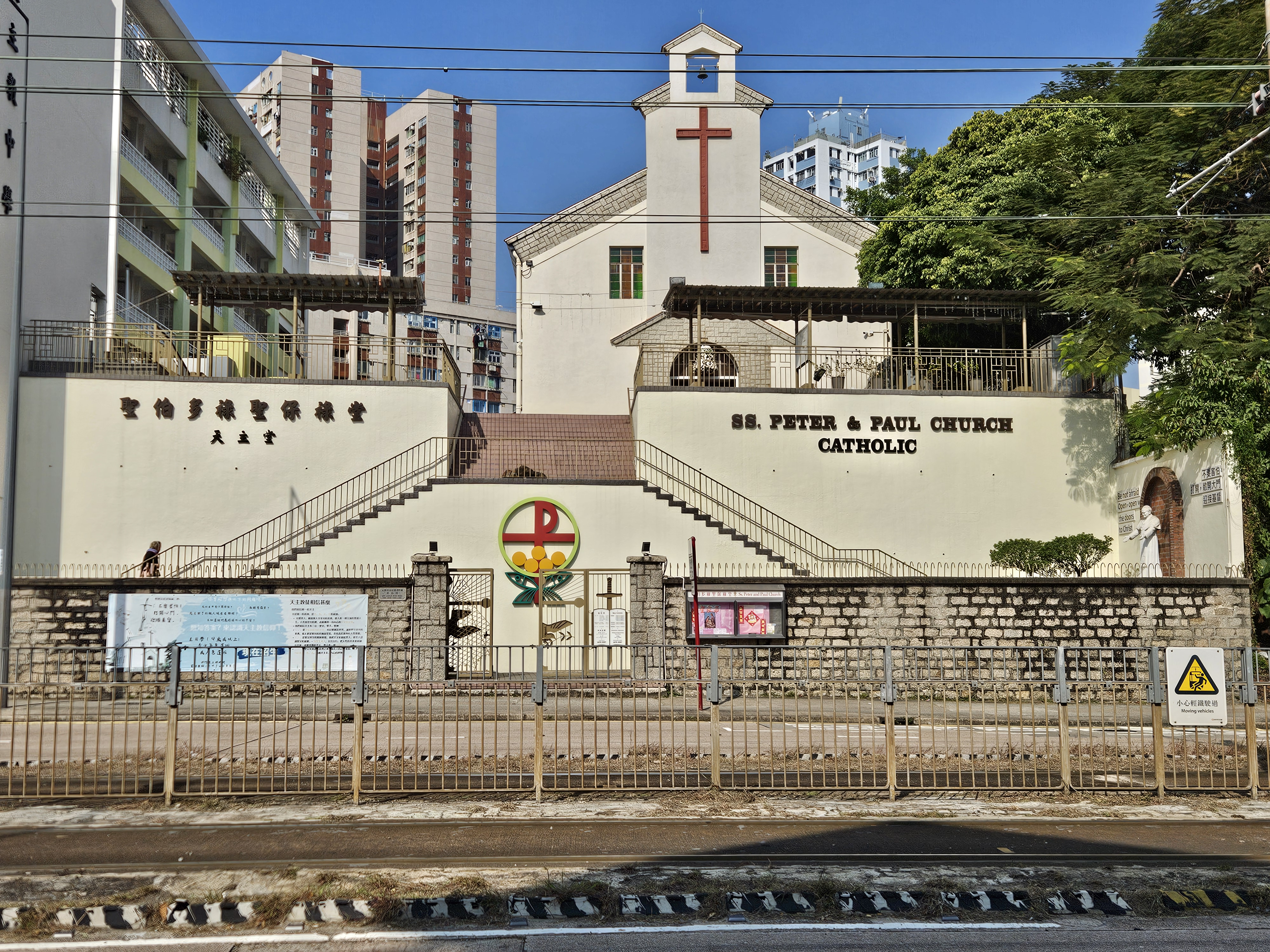
S.S. Peter and Paul Church at No. 201 Castle Peak Road, across the road from Shui Pin Tsuen.

Shui Pin Tsuen (Chinese: 水邊村) is a village in Wang Chau, Yuen Long District, Hong Kong.

== Administration ==
Shui Pin Tsuen is a recognized village under the New Territories Small House Policy. It is one of the 37 villages represented within the Ping Shan Rural Committee. For electoral purposes, Shui Pin Tsuen is part of the Ping Shan Central constituency, which is currently represented by Felix Cheung Chi-yeung.

== Features ==
Originally built in 1925 in Tung Tau Tsuen, Ss. Peter and Paul Church was relocated and rebuilt at No. 201 Castle Peak Road, near Shui Pin Tsuen, in 1958.

== See also ==
- Shui Pin Wai
- Shui Pin Wai Estate
- Shui Pin Wai stop
