= HMT =

HMT may refer to:

Science

- Hexamethylenetetramine
- Histamine N-methyltransferase
- Histone methyltransferase
- Host modulatory therapy

Places

- Ham Street railway station, England
- Hang Mei Tsuen stop, Hong Kong
- Heathmont railway station, Melbourne
- Hemet-Ryan Airport, California, United States

Organizations and Companies

- HMT Limited (Hindustan Machine Tools Limited), an Indian watch manufacturer
- Several Hochschule für Musik und Theater (disambiguation)

Other

- Hamtai language, spoken in Papua New Guinea
- Royal Navy ship prefixes:
  - His Majesty's Trawler (see trawlers of the Royal Navy)
  - Hired Military Transport, troopship
- Abbreviation for HM Treasury, United Kingdom
