= Chung Uk Tsuen =

Chung Uk Tsuen (Chinese: 鍾屋村) may refer to:

- Chung Uk Tsuen (Tai Po District), a village in Lam Tsuen, Tai Po District, Hong Kong
- Chung Uk Tsuen (Tuen Mun District), a village in Lam Tei, Tuen Mun District, Hong Kong
- Chung Uk Tsuen stop, a Light Rail stop in Tuen Mun, Hong Kong
