= Shui Pin Wai =

Walled village in Hong Kong

Coordinates: 22.444826°N 114.01853°E

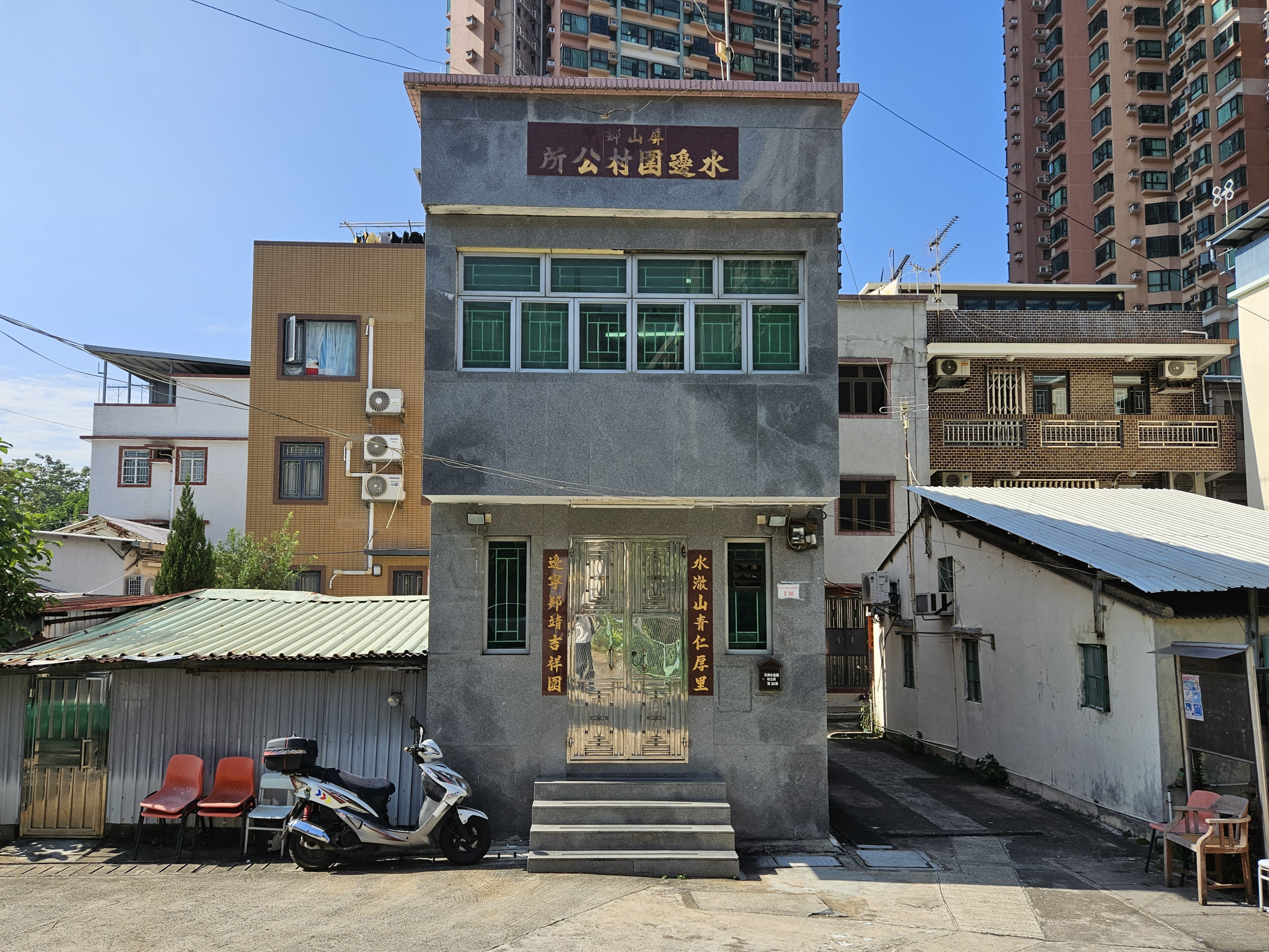
Shui Pin Wai Village Office

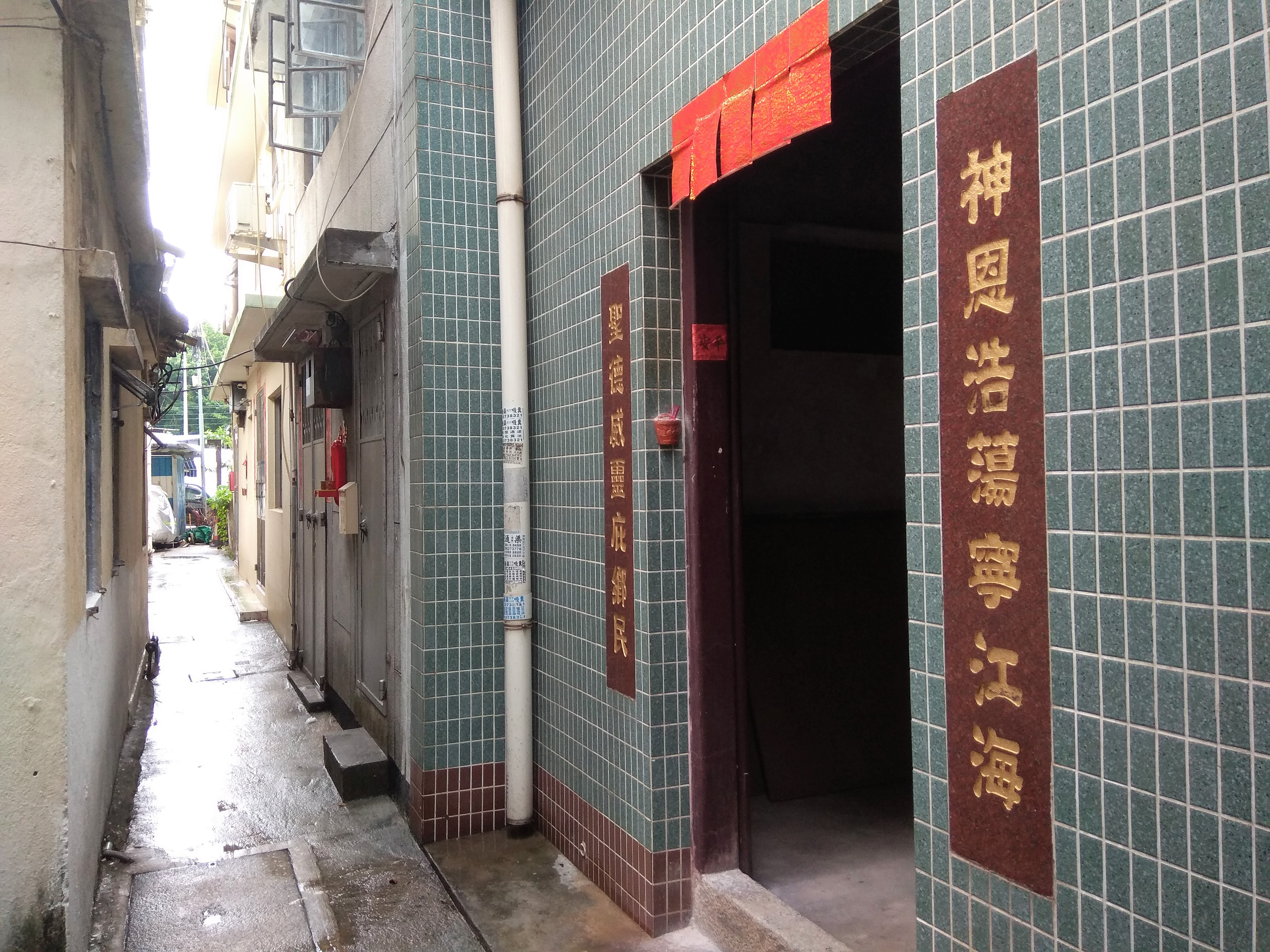
Village shrine of Shui Pin Wai

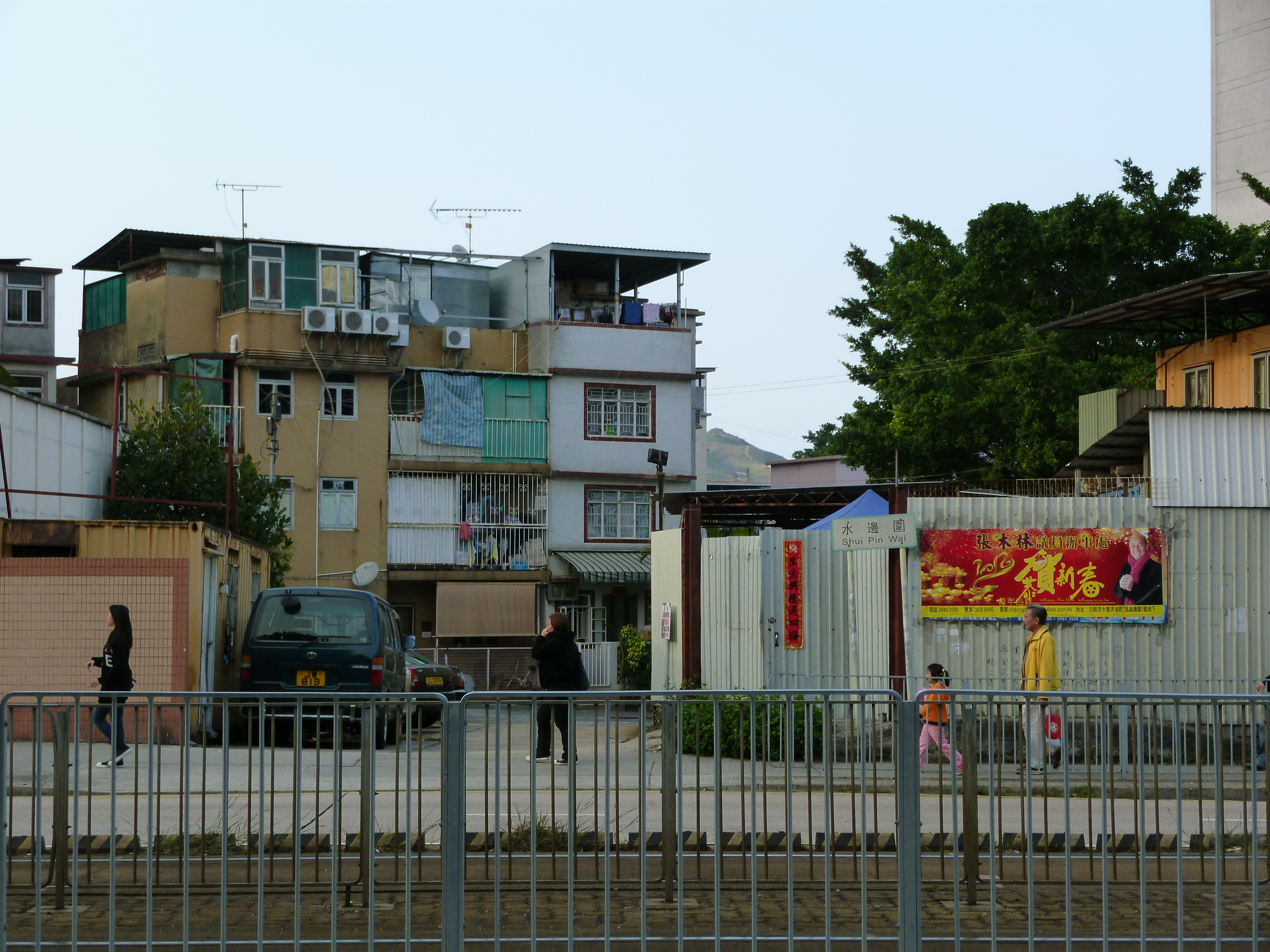
Shui Pin Wai viewed from Castle Peak Road - Ping Shan

Shui Pin Wai (Chinese: 水邊圍) is a walled village in Wang Chau, Yuen Long District, Hong Kong.

== Administration ==
Shui Pin Wai is a recognized village under the New Territories Small House Policy. It is one of the 37 villages represented within the Ping Shan Rural Committee. For electoral purposes, Shui Pin Wai is part of the Ping Shan Central constituency, which is currently represented by Felix Cheung Chi-yeung.

== Education ==
Shui Pin Wai is in Primary One Admission (POA) School Net 73. Within the school net are multiple aided schools (operated independently but funded with government money) and one government school: South Yuen Long Government Primary School (南元朗官立小學).

== See also ==
- Walled villages of Hong Kong
- Shui Pin Tsuen
- Shui Pin Wai Estate
- Shui Pin Wai stop
