= Hung Shui Kiu stop =

MTR Light Rail stop in Hong Kong

Hung Shui Kiu 洪水橋
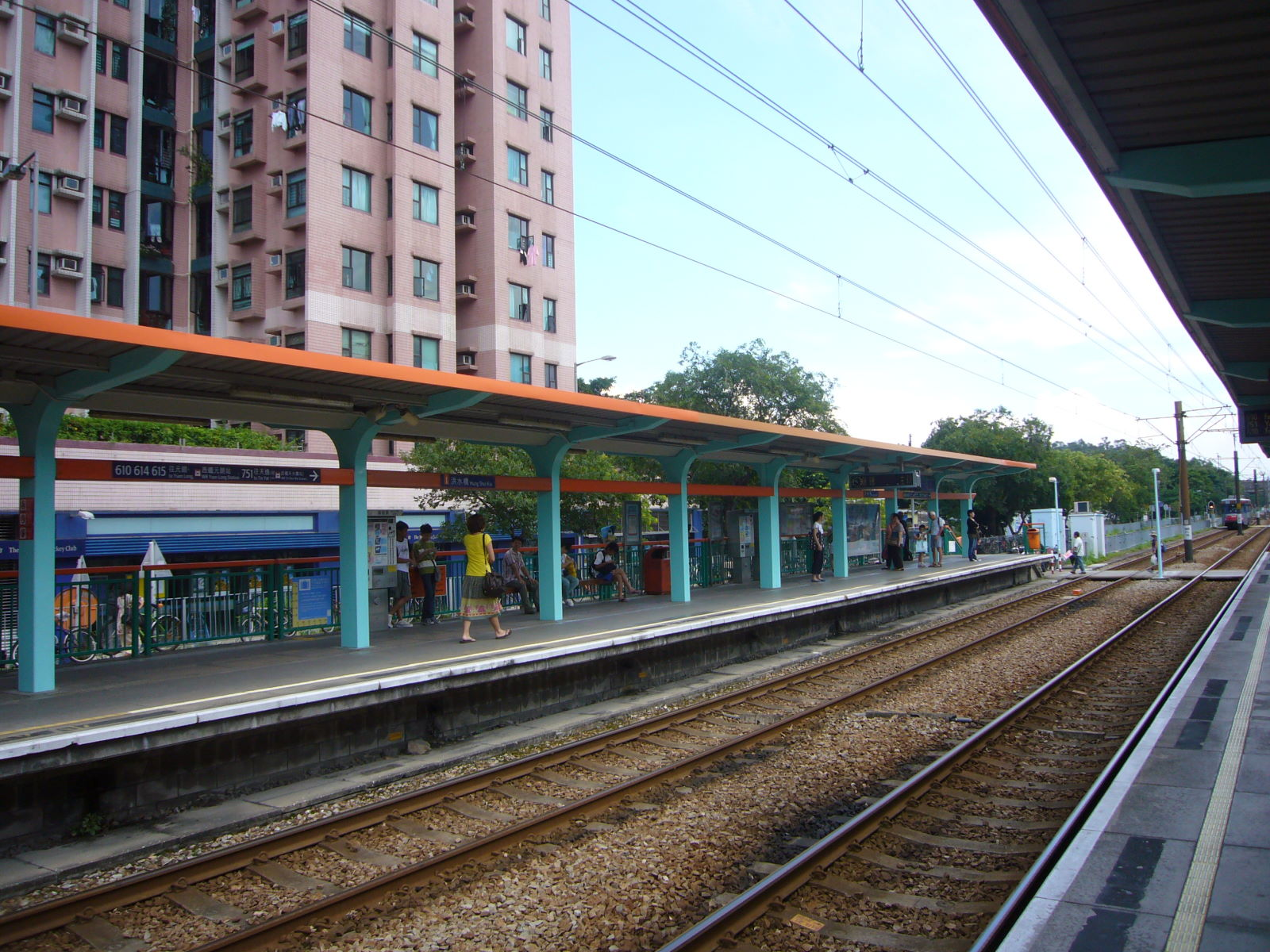
- Hung Shui Kiu stop platform

General information
- Location: Castle Peak Road – Hung Shui Kiu, Hung Shui Kiu; Yuen Long District; Hong Kong
- Coordinates: 22°26′01″N 113°59′51″E
- System: MTR Light Rail stop
- Owner: KCR Corporation
- Operator: MTR Corporation
- Line: 610 614 615 751
- Platforms: 2 side platforms
- Tracks: 2
- Connections: Bus, minibus

Construction
- Structure type: At-grade
- Accessible: yes

Other information
- Station code: HSK (English code); 380 (Digital code)
- Fare zone: 4

History
- Opened: 18 September 1988; 38 years ago

Services
Preceding stop	MTR Light Rail	Following stop
Chung Uk Tsuen towards Tuen Mun Ferry Pier	610	Tong Fong Tsuen towards Yuen Long
Chung Uk Tsuen towards Tuen Mun Ferry Pier	614	Tong Fong Tsuen towards Yuen Long
Chung Uk Tsuen towards Tuen Mun Ferry Pier	615	Tong Fong Tsuen towards Yuen Long
Chung Uk Tsuen towards Yau Oi	751	Hang Mei Tsuen towards Tin Yat
Location
- Location within MTR

Hung Shui Kiu (Chinese: 洪水橋) is an at-grade MTR Light Rail stop located at Castle Peak Road in Yuen Long District, near Hung Shui Kiu. It began service on 18 September 1988 and belongs to Zone 4.
