= NAW =

NAW or Naw may refer to:

- National Assembly of Women, a British women's rights organisation
- Nutzfahrzeuggesellschaft Arbon & Wetzikon, a Swiss manufacturer of motorbuses and trolleybuses
- Nai Wai stop, Hong Kong, MTR station code NAW
- Narathiwat Airport, Thailand, IATA code NAW
- Nav (Slavic folklore), or naw, the souls of the dead
- Nawuri language, ISO 639-3 language code naw
