= TOF =

TOF or Tof may refer to:

- The Original Factory Shop, a British discount department store
- Time of flight, a principle of several scientific methods
  - Time-of-flight camera, a camera system that analyzes time of flight of the light it captures, to resolve depth
  - Time-of-flight mass spectrometry uses the time of flight of an ion in the gas phase to resolve its mass-to-charge ratio
- Tetralogy of Fallot, a congenital heart defect
- TOF, British abbreviation for Tracheoesophageal fistula, an abnormal connection between the esophagus and the trachea
- Turnover frequency, a rate in chemical reactions
- TOF, IATA airport code for Bogashevo Airport, in Tomsk, Russia
- Pacific Fleet (Russia) (Russian: Тихоокеанский флот, ТОФ, romanized: Tikhookeansky flot, TOF)
- Torch of Freedom, a novel by David Weber
- TOF, MTR station code for Tong Fong Tsuen stop, in Hong Kong
- TOF (Top of Form), relates to the print start position i.e. the position the printer starts printing from at the top of the page
- Tower of Fantasy, a video game
- Tof, alternate term for the Tofalar people of Siberian Russia
- The timbrel or hand-drum in the Hebrew music of Old Testament times
- Tof, green-skinned humanoids from planet Tof, from the Star Wars universe
