= Ping Shan stop =

Coordinates: 22°26′34″N 114°00′42″E

Ping Shan 屏山
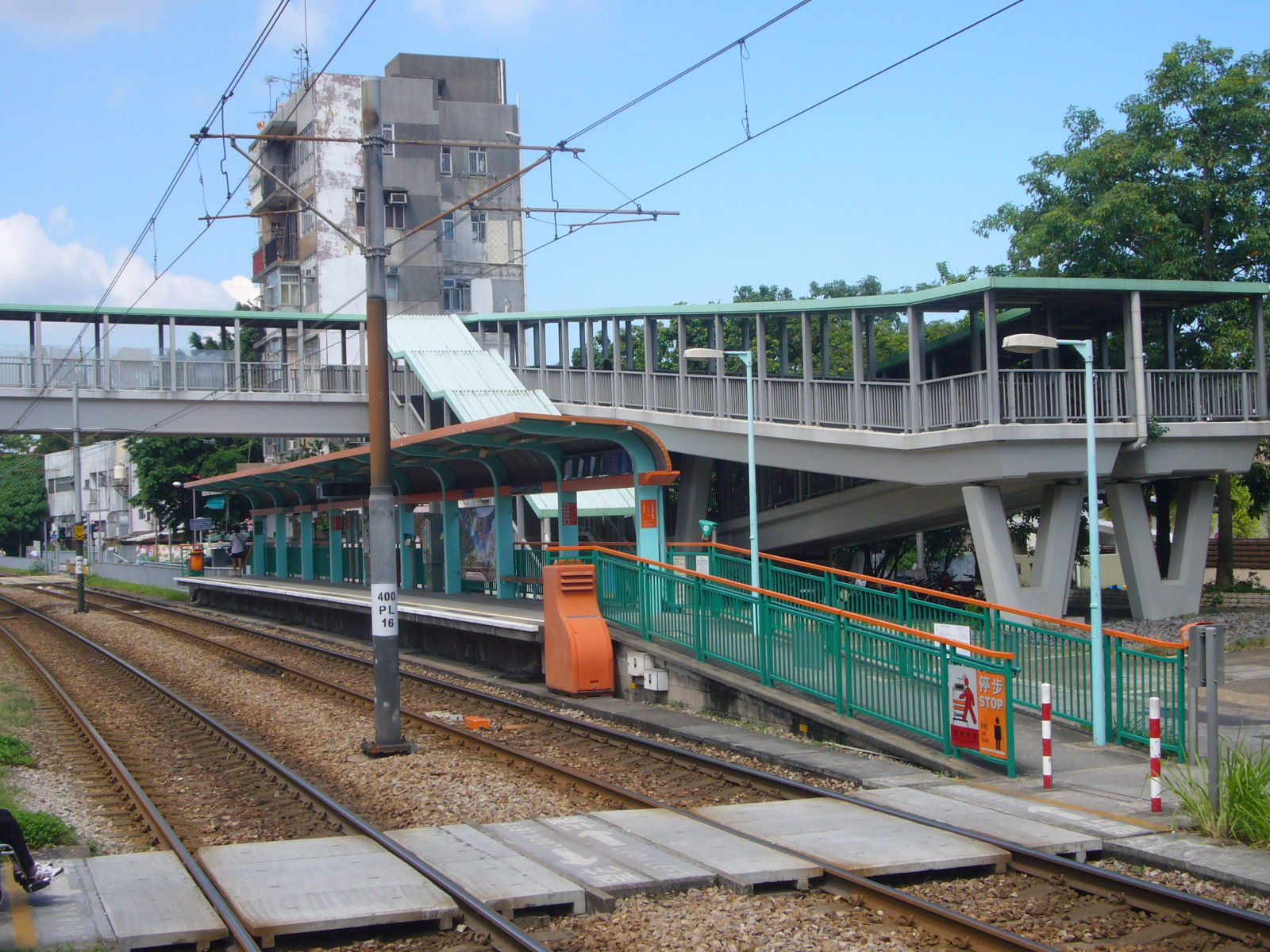
- Ping Shan stop platform in August 2008

General information
- Location: Castle Peak Road – Ping Shan; Ping Shan; Yuen Long District; Hong Kong
- System: MTR Light Rail stop
- Owner: KCR Corporation
- Operator: MTR Corporation
- Line: 610 614 615 761P
- Platforms: 2 side platforms
- Tracks: 2
- Connections: Bus, minibus

Construction
- Structure type: At-grade
- Accessible: yes

Other information
- Station code: PIS (English code); 400 (English code)
- Fare zone: 4

History
- Opened: 18 September 1988; 37 years ago

Services
Preceding stop	MTR Light Rail	Following stop
Tong Fong Tsuen towards Tuen Mun Ferry Pier	610	Shui Pin Wai towards Yuen Long
Tong Fong Tsuen towards Tuen Mun Ferry Pier	614	Shui Pin Wai towards Yuen Long
Tong Fong Tsuen towards Tuen Mun Ferry Pier	615	Shui Pin Wai towards Yuen Long
Tong Fong Tsuen towards Tin Yat	761P	Shui Pin Wai towards Yuen Long
Location
- Location within MTR

Ping Shan (Chinese: 屏山) is an at-grade MTR Light Rail stop located at Castle Peak Road in Yuen Long District, near Ping Shan. It began service on 18 September 1988 and belongs to Zone 4.
