= Nai Wai stop =

Light rail stop in Hong Kong

Coordinates: 22°25′27″N 113°59′12″E

Nai Wai 泥圍
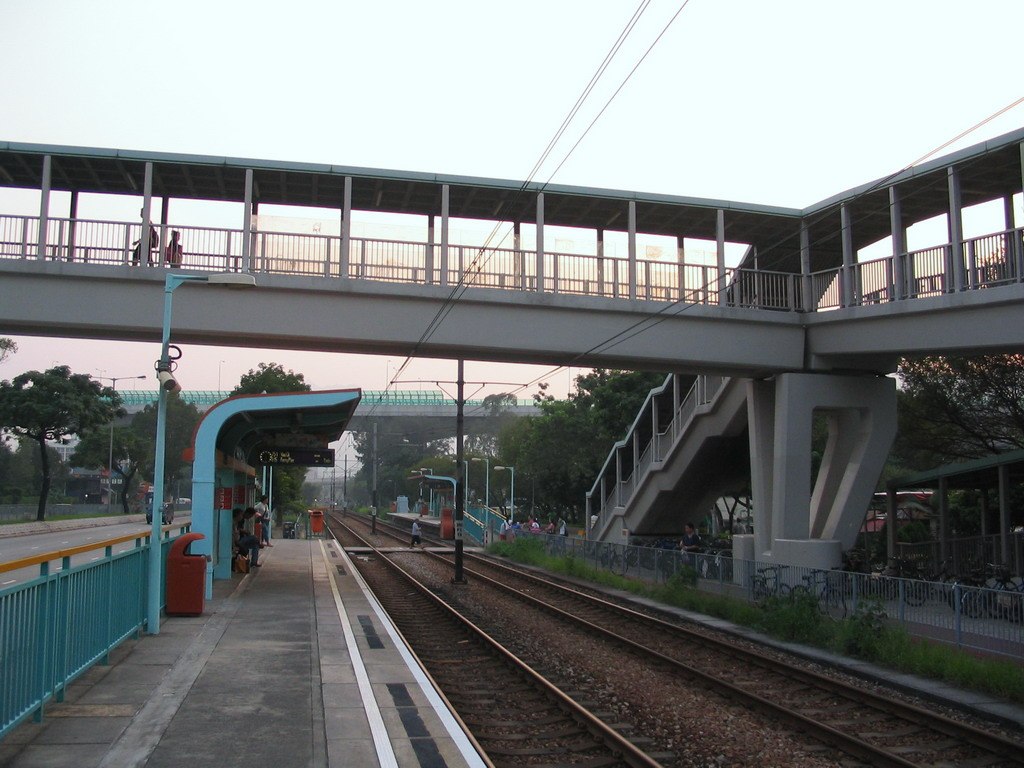
- Nai Wai stop's Platform

General information
- Location: Nai Wai; Tuen Mun District; Hong Kong
- System: MTR Light Rail stop
- Owner: KCR Corporation
- Operator: MTR Corporation
- Line: 610 614 615 751
- Platforms: 2 side platforms
- Tracks: 2
- Connections: Bus, minibus

Construction
- Structure type: At-grade
- Accessible: yes

Other information
- Station code: NAW (English code); 360 (Digital code)
- Fare zone: 3

History
- Opened: 18 September 1988; 37 years ago

Services
Preceding stop	MTR Light Rail	Following stop
Lam Tei towards Tuen Mun Ferry Pier	610	Chung Uk Tsuen towards Yuen Long
Lam Tei towards Tuen Mun Ferry Pier	614	Chung Uk Tsuen towards Yuen Long
Lam Tei towards Tuen Mun Ferry Pier	615	Chung Uk Tsuen towards Yuen Long
Lam Tei towards Yau Oi	751	Chung Uk Tsuen towards Tin Yat
Location
- Location within MTR

Nai Wai (Chinese: 泥圍) is an at-grade MTR Light Rail stop located at Castle Peak Road in Lam Tei, Tuen Mun District, near Nai Wai. It began service on 18 September 1988 and belongs to Zone 3.

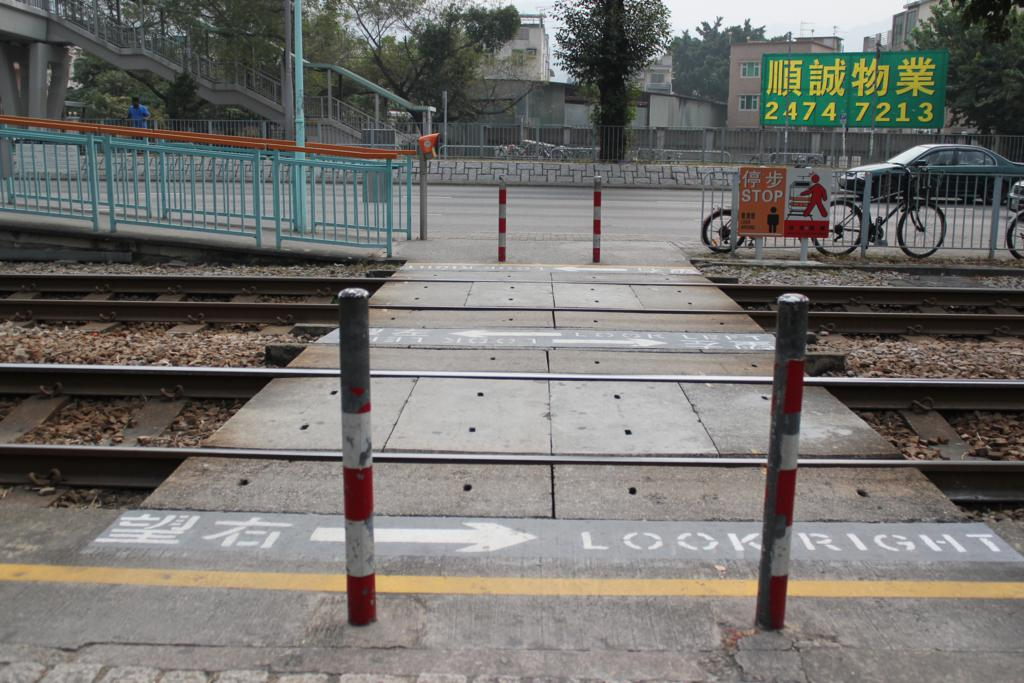
Crossing at Nai Wai Stop
