= Chung Uk Tsuen stop =

Rail stop in Tuen Mun District, Hong Kong

Chung Uk Tsuen 鍾屋村
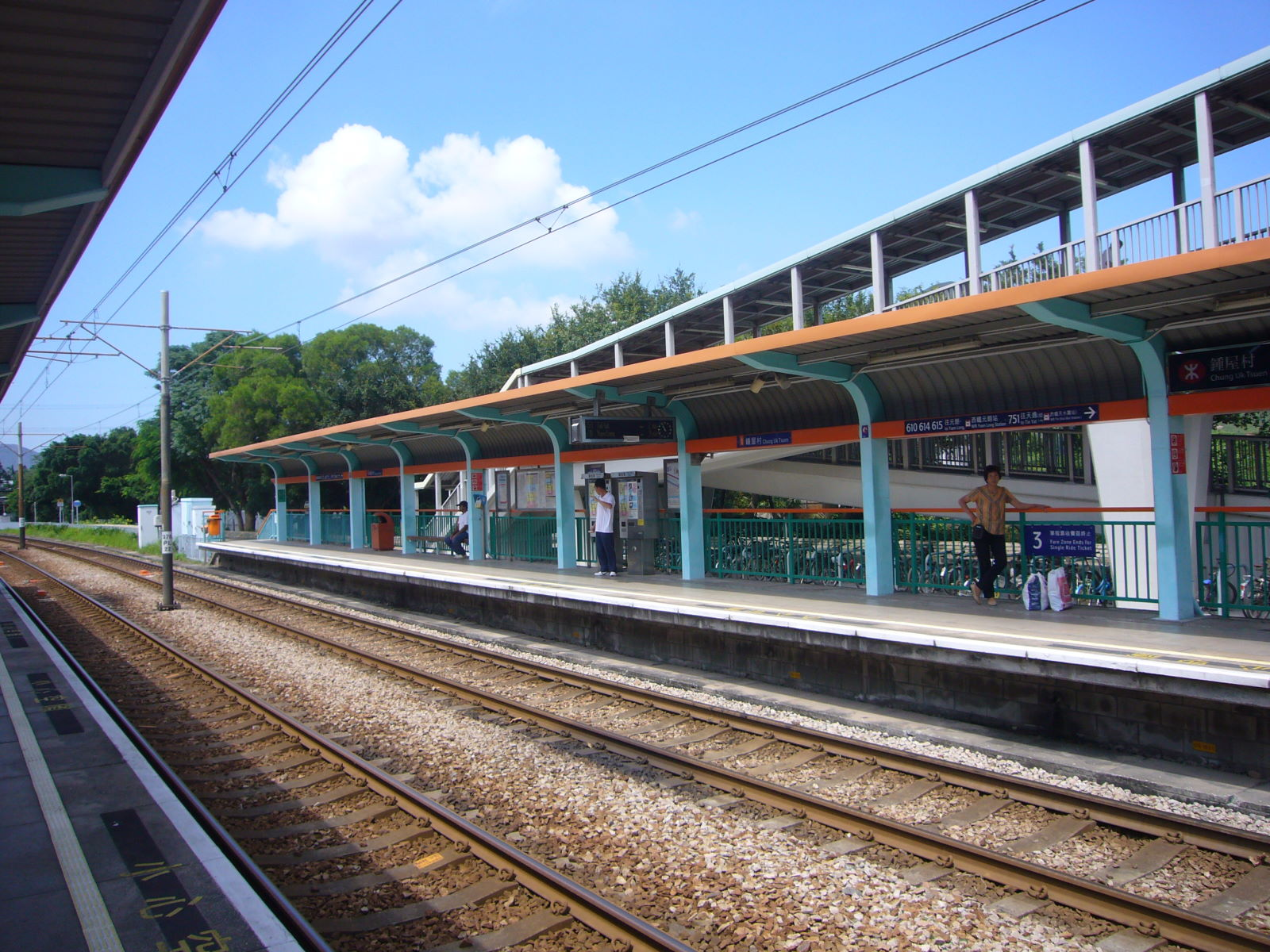
- Chung Uk Tsuen stop platform

General information
- Location: Castle Peak Road – Hung Shui Kiu, Chung Uk Tsuen; Tuen Mun District; Hong Kong
- Coordinates: 22°25′47″N 113°59′32″E
- System: MTR Light Rail stop
- Owner: KCR Corporation
- Operator: MTR Corporation
- Line: 610 614 615 751
- Platforms: 2 side platforms
- Tracks: 2
- Connections: Bus, minibus

Construction
- Structure type: At-grade
- Accessible: yes

Other information
- Station code: CUT (English code); 370 (Digital code)
- Fare zone: 3

History
- Opened: 18 September 1988; 37 years ago

Services
| Preceding stop | MTR Light Rail | Following stop |
|---|---|---|
| Nai Wai towards Tuen Mun Ferry Pier | 610 | Hung Shui Kiu towards Yuen Long |
| Nai Wai towards Tuen Mun Ferry Pier | 614 | Hung Shui Kiu towards Yuen Long |
| Nai Wai towards Tuen Mun Ferry Pier | 615 | Hung Shui Kiu towards Yuen Long |
| Nai Wai towards Yau Oi | 751 | Hung Shui Kiu towards Tin Yat |
Location
- Location within MTR

Chung Uk Tsuen (Chinese: 鍾屋村) is an at-grade MTR Light Rail stop located at Castle Peak Road in Tuen Mun District, near Chung Uk Tsuen. It began service on 18 September 1988 and belongs to Zone 3.
