= Tong Fong Tsuen stop =

MTR station in New Territories, Hong Kong

Tong Fong Tsuen 塘坊村
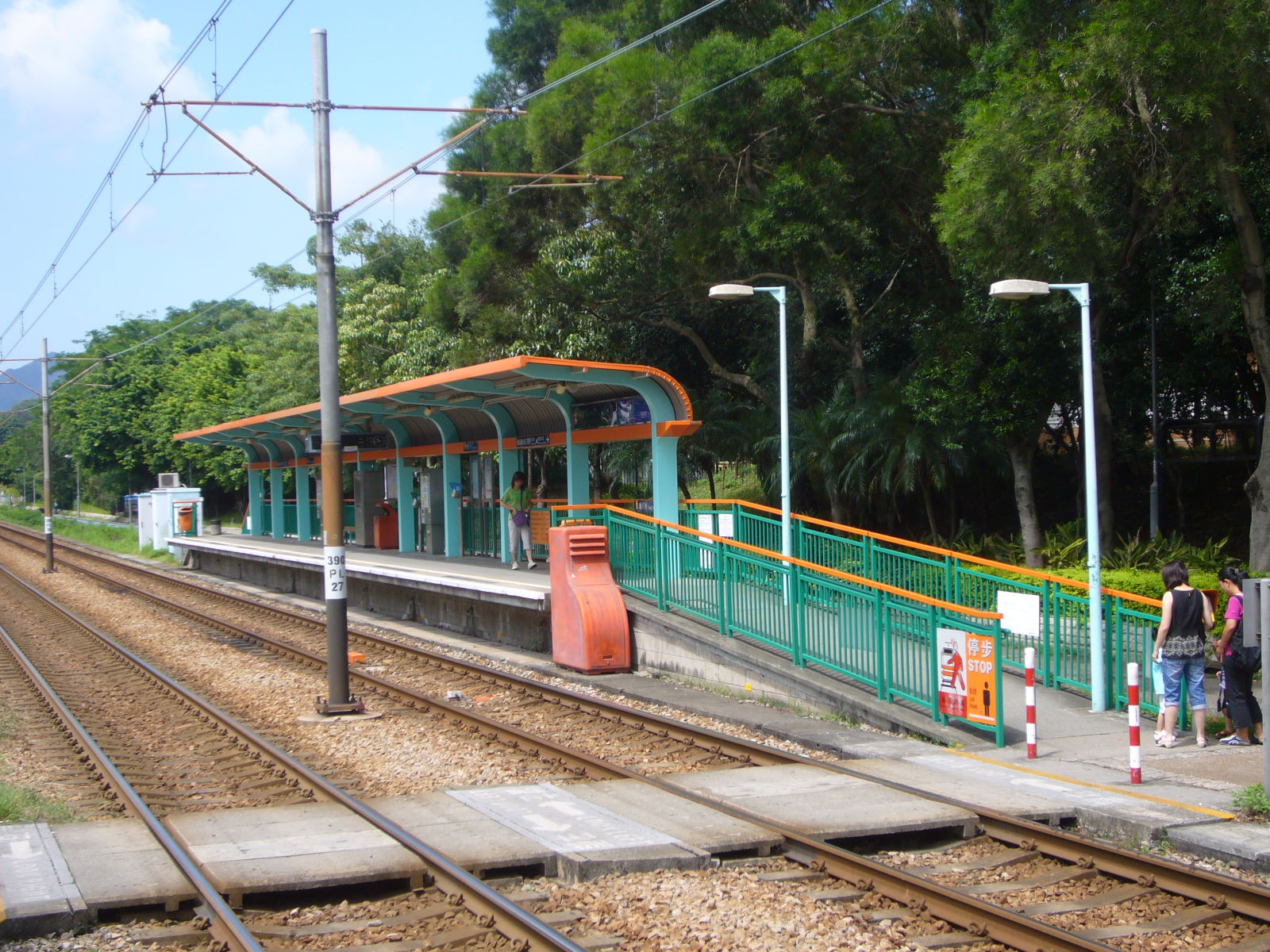
- Tong Fong Tsuen stop platform

General information
- Location: Castle Peak Road – Ping Shan, Tong Fong Tsuen; Yuen Long District; Hong Kong
- Coordinates: 22°26′25″N 114°00′25″E
- System: MTR Light Rail stop
- Owner: KCR Corporation
- Operator: MTR Corporation
- Lines: Light Rail routes 610, 614, 615 and 761P
- Platforms: 2 (2 side platforms)
- Tracks: 2
- Connections: Bus, minibus

Construction
- Structure type: At-grade
- Accessible: yes

Other information
- Station code: TOF (English code); 390 (Digital code)
- Fare zone: 4

History
- Opened: 18 September 1988; 37 years ago

Services
Preceding stop	MTR Light Rail	Following stop
Hung Shui Kiu towards Tuen Mun Ferry Pier	610	Ping Shan towards Yuen Long
Hung Shui Kiu towards Tuen Mun Ferry Pier	614	Ping Shan towards Yuen Long
Hung Shui Kiu towards Tuen Mun Ferry Pier	615	Ping Shan towards Yuen Long
Hang Mei Tsuen towards Tin Yat	761P	Ping Shan towards Yuen Long
Location
- Location within MTR

Tong Fong Tsuen (Chinese: 塘坊村) is an at-grade MTR Light Rail stop located at Castle Peak Road in Yuen Long District, near Tong Fong Tsuen. It began service on 18 September 1988 and belongs to Zone 4.
