= Shui Pin (constituency) =

Hong Kong constituency

- Elected constituency for the Yuen Long District Council
- Boundary of Shui Pin in Yuen Long District
- District: Yuen Long
- Legislative Council constituency: New Territories North West
- Population: 18,727 (2019)
- Electorate: 10,019 (2019)

Current constituency
- Created: 1994
- Number of members: One
- Member: Vacant

Shui Pin (Chinese: 水邊) is one of the 39 constituencies in the Yuen Long District of Hong Kong.

The constituency returns one district councillor to the Yuen Long District Council, with an election every four years. Shui Pin constituency is loosely based on Covent Garden, Emerald Green, Greenery Place, Park Royale, Parkside Villa, Scenic Gardens, Shui Pin Wai Estate, Springdale Villas and Villa Art Deco in Yuen Long with an estimated population of 18,727.

== Councillors represented ==
| Election | Member | Party |
|---|---|---|
| 1991 | Cheung Yin-tung | United Democrats |
| 1994 | Cheung Yin-tung | Democratic |
| 1994 | Wong Kin-wing | Nonpartisan |
| 2007 | Yuen Man-yee | Liberal |
| 2008 | Yuen Man-yee | Nonpartisan |
| 2019 | Lai Kwok-wing→Vacant | TCHDNTW→Nonpartisan |

== Election results ==
=== 2010s ===
Yuen Long District Council Election, 2019: Shui Pin
| Party | Candidate | Votes | % | ±% |
|---|---|---|---|---|
| Team Chu (PfD) | Lai Kwok-wing | 3,799 | 51.68 | |
| Independent | Yuen Man-yee | 3,466 | 47.15 | |
| Nonpartisan | Ivaline Poon Sin-man | 86 | 1.17 | |
| Majority | | 333 | 4.53 | |
| Turnout | | 7,380 | 73.70 | |
| Team Chu gain from Independent | | Swing | | |
