= Hong Kong bus route numbering =

System for buses and the public light bus

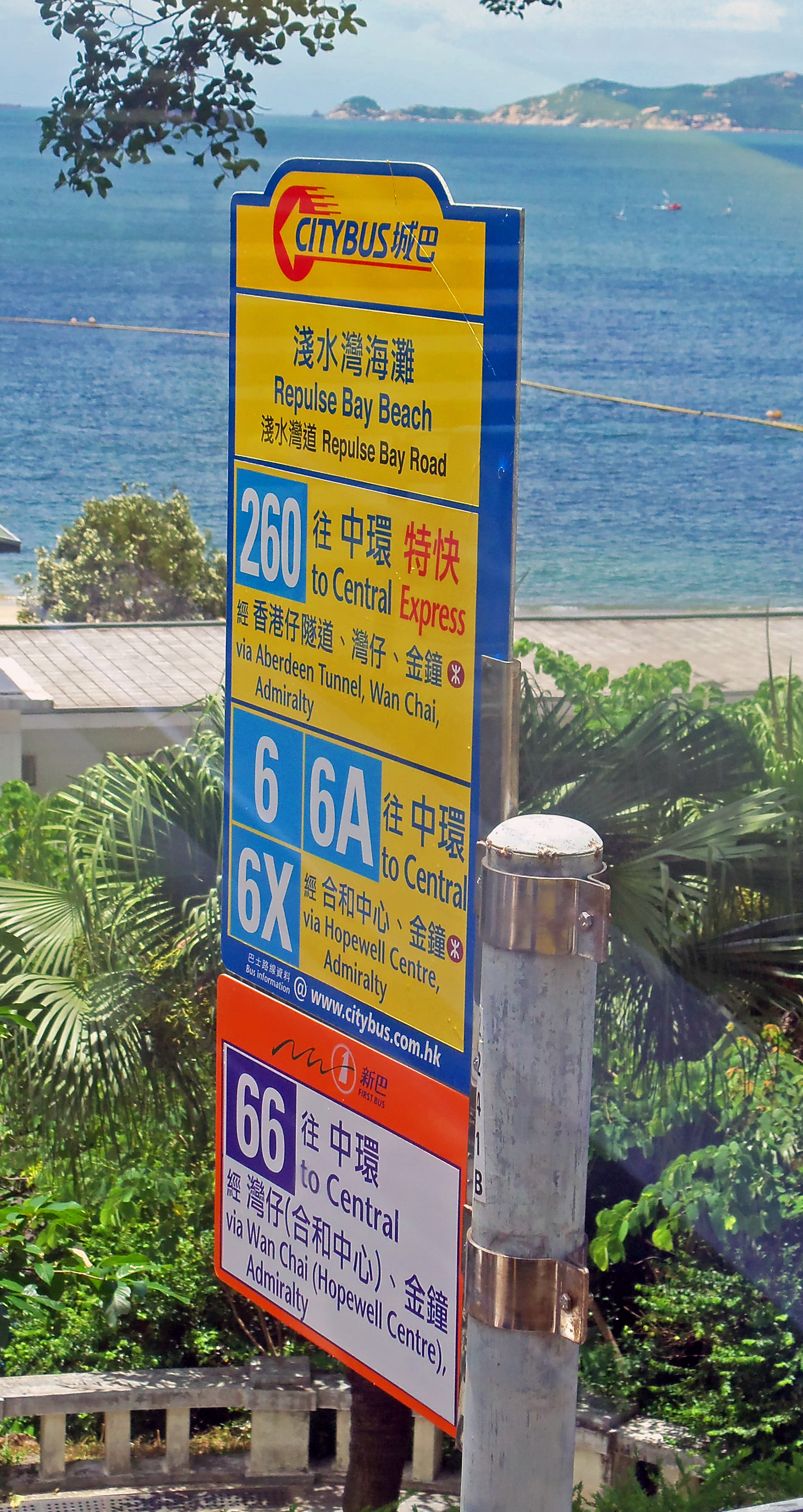
A bus route sign at the Repulse Bay Beach Stop (淺水灣海灘), with both Citybus and NWFB routes shown

In Hong Kong, public bus, public light bus (also known as green minibus) and residential bus routes bear their own route numbers.

== Public buses ==
The numbering systems of public buses can be classified into Hong Kong Island routes, Kowloon and New Territories routes, Lantau Island (New Lantao Bus) routes, MTR Bus routes, cross-Harbour routes and Airport and North Lantau external bus routes. Their route numbering systems are independent except cross harbour routes. For example, there are both route 1, and route 2 on Hong Kong Island, Kowloon and Lantau Island respectively.

Route 200-299 (Kowloon and New Territories) and 500-599 (Hong Kong Island) were previously deluxe bus services, and it became mandatory to be air-conditioned in 1990s except for emergency situation (e.g. opening of Tsing Ma Bridge, air-con bus breakdown, fleet shortages) during Kowloon Motor Bus and China Motor Bus time. The new operators in Hong Kong Island requires replacement of all non-aircon buses. Since the withdrawal of the last non-aircon bus in 2008 (Citybus/New World First Bus; which is route 15C) and 2012 (Kowloon Motor Bus), all bus routes in Hong Kong are required to have an inbuilt air-conditioning system and retains their numbering system in place. Also, on 11 February 2014, Citybus had withdrew the last non-aircon open-top bus from service.

At one time, there were two "N11" bus routes in Tung Chung, namely, Airport overnight route N11 and Lantau Island overnight route N11. The latter is no longer in service.

== Public light buses ==
The numbering systems of public light bus (green minibuses) are classified into Hong Kong Island public light bus routes, Kowloon public light bus routes and New Territories public light bus routes. There is one public light bus route operating in Airport/Lantau Island (901). Their route numbering systems are independent too. However, for cross harbour public light bus routes, the route numbers from Hong Kong Island or New Territories are used instead.

== Residential buses ==
Residential bus routes are the routes which are requested to operate by the residents or estates community. In the past, the route numbers are with a suffix "R". The first residential bus route was route 88R from City One Shatin to Kowloon Tong station (it was then renumbered 62R). From c. 2003, the route numbers have been changed to prefixes "HR", "KR", and "NR". They stand for Hong Kong Island residential bus routes, Kowloon residential bus routes and New Territories residential bus routes respectively. There is no residential bus services on Lantau Island (except Discovery Bay) and the Airport. Cross-harbour bus routes uses KR and NR services.

== Route numbering system for public buses ==
Route	Classification	Routes	Operators
2-digit Numbering in Hong Kong and "5xx" (Fully air-con bus routes before 1999)			Citybus
x1-x29	Original Hong Kong Island		
x30-x39	Southern District (Pok Fu Lam)		
x40-x49	Southern District (Kellett Bay)		
x50-x59	Western District (Mount Davis)		
x60-x69	Southern District (Repulse Bay, Stanley)		
x70-x79	Southern District (Aberdeen, Wong Chuk Hang)		
x80-x89	Eastern District (Chai Wan, Siu Sai Wan)		
x90-x99	Southern District (Ap Lei Chau)		
2-digit Numbering in Kowloon/New Territories and "2xx" (Fully air-con bus routes before 2008)			Kowloon Motor Bus
x1-x29	Kowloon		
x30-x39	Kwai Tsing, Tsuen Wan		
x40-x49	Kwai Tsing, Tsuen Wan		
x50-x59	Tuen Mun, Yuen Long		
x60-x69	Tuen Mun, Yuen Long		
x70-x79	North District, Sheung Shui		
x80-x89	Sha Tin		
x90-x99	Sai Kung		
2-digit Numbering in Lantau Island			New Lantao Bus
1-9			
10-19	Fully Air-Conditioned Bus Routes		
20-29	Ngong Ping		
30-39	Tung Chung		
3-digit Numbering
1xx	Cross-Harbour Tunnel routes		Citybus, Kowloon Motor Bus
260	Recreational route in Hong Kong Island.		Citybus
3xx	Peak-hour only cross-harbour routes (except for 307) and recreational routes in Hong Kong.		Citybus, Kowloon Motor Bus
38x	Recreational routes in Hong Kong Island		Citybus
4xx	Unused.		—N/a
58x	Routes operated by Citybus in Kowloon/New Territories.		Citybus
6xx	Eastern Harbour Crossing routes		Citybus, Kowloon Motor Bus
70x	Citybus routes in West Kowloon		Citybus
72x	Island Eastern Corridor routes		Citybus
78x	Island Eastern Corridor routes		Citybus
79x	Citybus routes in Sai Kung and Tseung Kwan O		Citybus
8xx	Sha Tin Racecourse routes		Kowloon Motor Bus
9xx	Western Harbour Crossing routes		Citybus, Kowloon Motor Bus
North Lantau Bus Routes (Using A, E, N, NA, R, S and X)
0x	Citybus and Long Win Bus jointly operate short-distance/shuttle routes		
1x	to Hong Kong Island		Citybus
2x	to Kowloon/Tseung Kwan O		Citybus
3x	to New Territories West		Long Win Bus
4x	to New Territories East		Long Win Bus
5x	Shuttle Service		Citybus
6x	Shuttle Service		Long Win Bus
Prefixes
A	Airport deluxe bus routes		
B	Border routes		
B	Lok Ma Chau Spur Line Control Point routes	B1	
B	Shenzhen Bay Control Point routes	B2, B2P, B2X, B3, B3A, B3M, B3X	
B	Hong Kong–Zhuhai–Macau Bridge routes	Prefix A, Prefix NA, B4, B5, B6, N35	
B	Heung Yuen Wai Control Point routes	79K, B7, B8, B9	
DB	Discovery Bay Bus Service		
E	North Lantau external bus routes		
H	Citybus Rickshaw Sightseeing Bus routes		Citybus
HK	Kowloon Bus Company Sightseeing Bus routes		Kowloon Motor Bus
K	MTR Bus (formerly KCR Feeder Bus) routes		
M	Some bus routes that are terminated at an MTR station		
N	Overnight bus routes		
NA	Overnight Airport deluxe bus routes		
P	Premium bus routes		Kowloon Motor Bus
R	Recreational bus routes (for Hong Kong Disneyland / Marathon)		
S	Airport shuttle bus routes		
T	Special express routes for relieving rail services	T74, T270, T277 (except T80)	
W	Routes that terminates at West Kowloon Highspeed link station: W2, W3		
X	Express routes for special services	X6C	
Y	Bus routes which operate during the first stage of the high wind management measures in the Tsing Ma Bridge	Y31, Y41	Kowloon Motor Bus
Suffixes
A, B, C, D, E, F	Conventional routes		
H	Hospital routes		
K	Routes that connect to the Tuen Ma Line or East Rail Line.		
M	Routes that connect to MTR Urban Lines.		
P	Peak hour-only routes (except KMB 8P, 40P, 276P, Citybus 8P, 796P, Long Win Bus A41P and New Lantau Bus B2P, which are whole-day services)		
R	Recreational bus routes		
S	Peak-hour only routes or special services		
X	Express services		
Rail Bridging Services
500 - 599	Light Rail		
600 - 699	Light Rail		
AE	Airport Express		
D	Tuen Ma Line		
E	East Rail Line		
H	Island Line, previously those from Hong Kong Station		
K	Kwun Tong Line, previously those from Kowloon Station		
K	East Rail Line		
M	Tuen Ma Line (Ma On Shan)		
P	Tuen Ma Line (Tsuen Wan and Kowloon)		
S	South Island Line		
T	Tsuen Wan Line		
TE	Tung Chung Line and Disneyland Resort Line		
TKL	Tseung Kwan O Line		
W	Tuen Ma Line		

== See also ==
- Transport in Hong Kong
- List of bus routes in Hong Kong
