= Hang Mei Tsuen stop =

Hong Kong light rail station

Coordinates: 22°26′43″N 114°00′20″E

Hang Mei Tsuen 坑尾村
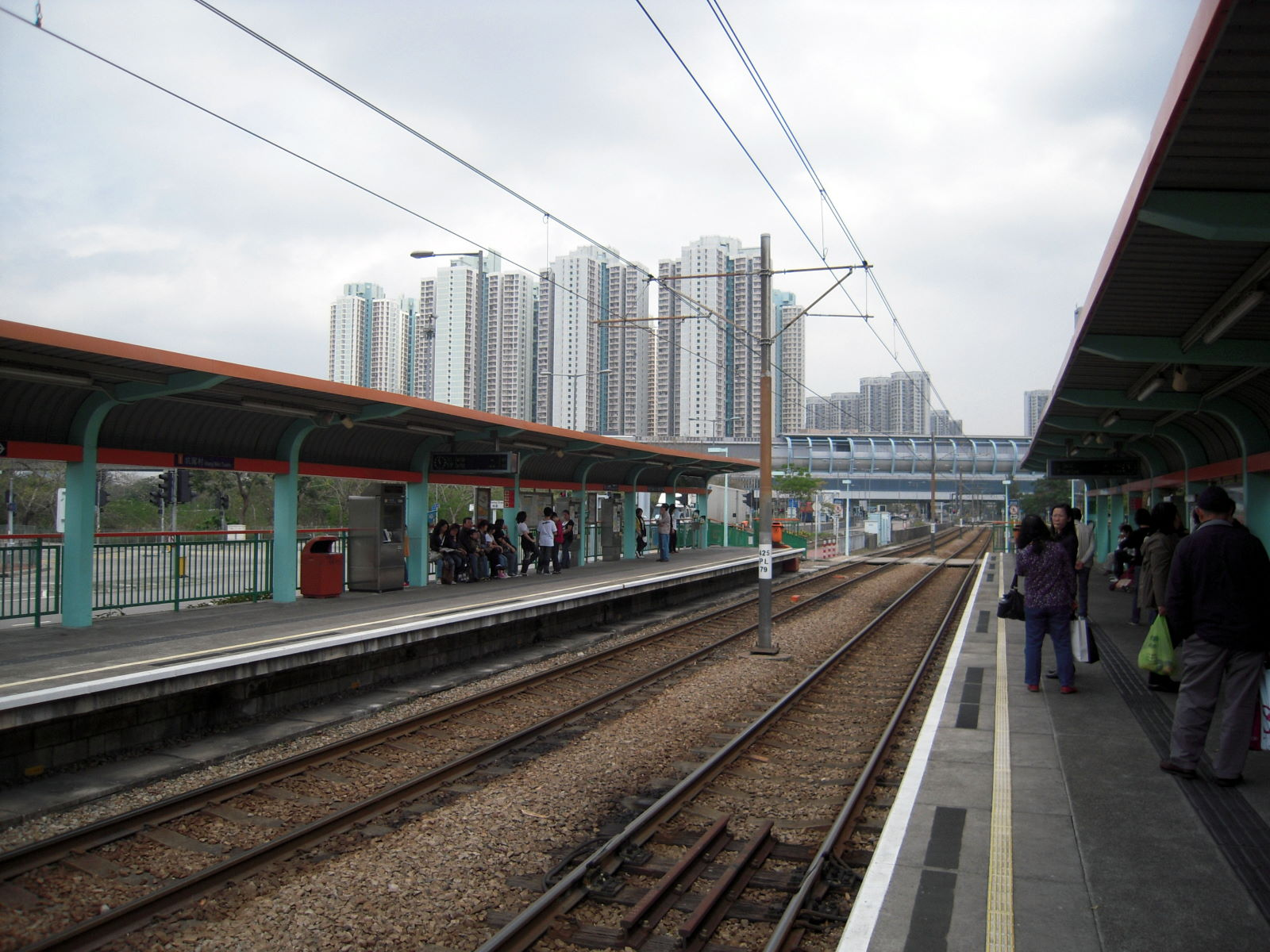
- Hang Mei Tsuen stop platform

General information
- Location: Hang Mei Tsuen; Yuen Long District; Hong Kong
- System: MTR Light Rail stop
- Owner: KCR Corporation
- Operator: MTR Corporation
- Lines: Light Rail routes 751 and 761P
- Platforms: 2 (2 side platforms)
- Tracks: 2
- Connections: Bus, minibus

Construction
- Structure type: At-grade
- Accessible: yes

Other information
- Station code: HMT (English code); 425 (Digital code)
- Fare zone: 4

History
- Opened: 10 January 1993; 33 years ago

Services
| Preceding stop | MTR Light Rail | Following stop |
|---|---|---|
| Hung Shui Kiu towards Yau Oi | 751 | Tin Shui Wai towards Tin Yat |
| Tin Yiu towards Tin Yat | 761P | Tong Fong Tsuen towards Yuen Long |
Location
- Location within MTR

Hang Mei Tsuen (Chinese: 坑尾村) is an MTR Light Rail stop. It is located at ground level at Ping Ha Road near Hang Mei Tsuen in Ping Shan, Yuen Long District. It began service on 10 January 1993 and belongs to Zone 4.

The station, named after the nearby rural village of Hang Mei Tsuen, is utilised by some passengers as an interchange between routes 751 and 761P.

== History ==
The station opened on 10 January 1993 as part of the 2.7-km Tin Shui Wai Extension project, built by KCR to serve the developing Tin Shui Wai New Town. It was initially served by Route 721 from Tin Shui Wai to Yuen Long. Two months later, on 27 March 1993, an additional service (route 722) commenced between Tin Shui Wai and Siu Hong stop.

Route 722 (to Siu Hong) was replaced with route 720 (to Yau Oi), which in turn was replaced with route 751 in December 2003. At the same time, Route 721 was replaced with route 761. The December 2003 changes were made due to the commissioning of the then-called West Rail project.

There was an accident at this station on 20 December 2016. Two light rail trains collided, injuring 19.

== Physical description ==
Hang Mei Tsuen stop has two covered, open-air side platforms, each long enough to accommodate a two-car train. The shelters cover the full length of both platforms.

The platforms can be entered from both their north and south ends. The northern ends of both platforms are accessible by ramps, whereas stairs are provided at the southern ends. There are pedestrian level crossings at either end of the station.

== See also ==
- Ping Shan Tin Shui Wai Public Library – located to the north
