= Shui Pin Wai stop =

Coordinates: 22°26′40″N 114°01′11″E

Shui Pin Wai 水邊圍
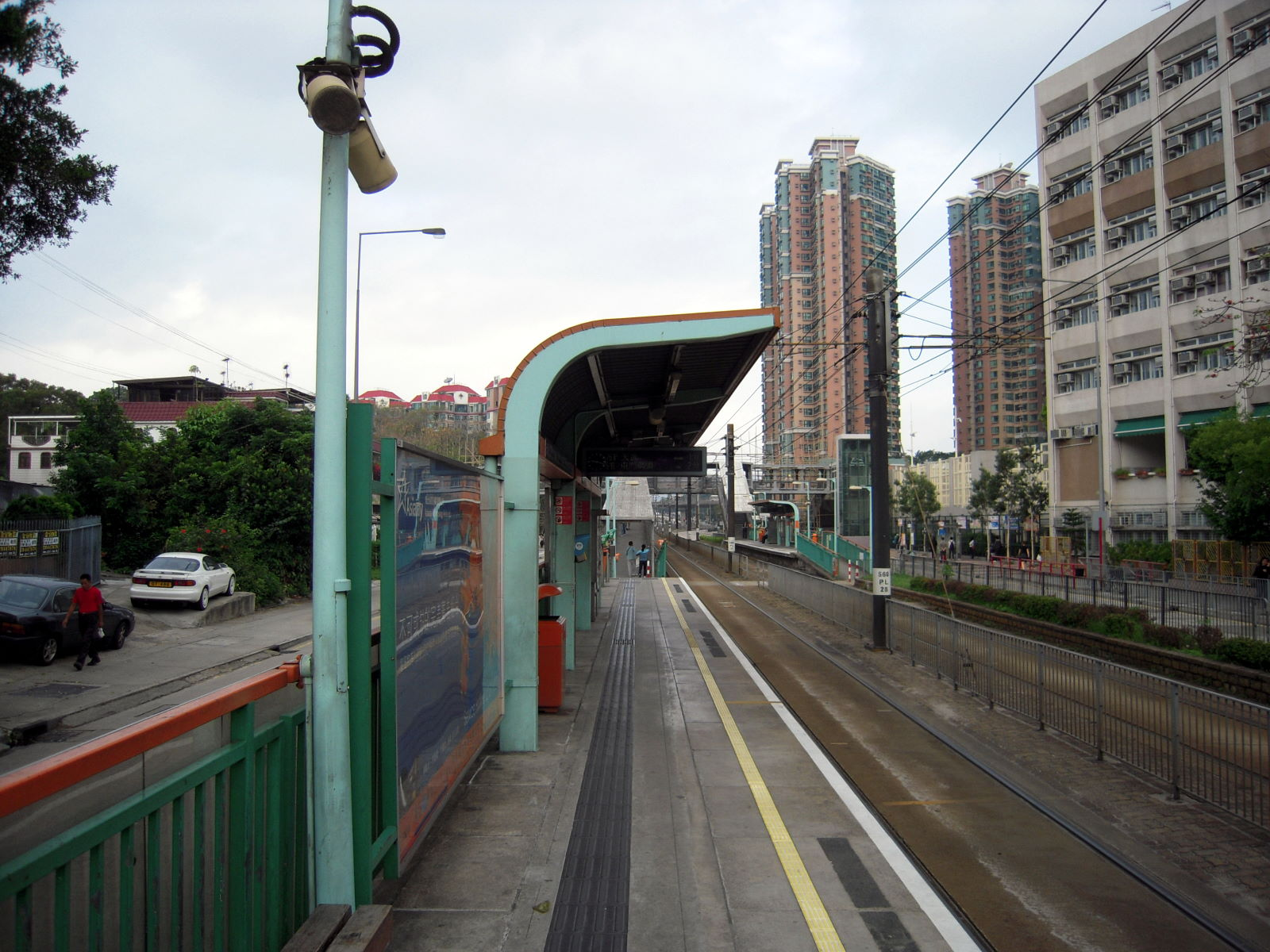
- Shui Pin Wai stop platform

General information
- Location: Shui Pin Wai Estate; Yuen Long District; Hong Kong
- System: MTR Light Rail stop
- Owner: KCR Corporation
- Operator: MTR Corporation
- Line: 610 614 615 761P
- Platforms: 2 side platforms
- Tracks: 2
- Connections: Bus, minibus

Construction
- Structure type: At-grade
- Accessible: yes

Other information
- Station code: SPW (English code); 560 (Digital code)
- Fare zone: 5

History
- Opened: 18 September 1988; 37 years ago

Services
| Preceding stop | MTR Light Rail | Following stop |
|---|---|---|
| Ping Shan towards Tuen Mun Ferry Pier | 610 | Fung Nin Road towards Yuen Long |
| Ping Shan towards Tuen Mun Ferry Pier | 614 | Fung Nin Road towards Yuen Long |
| Ping Shan towards Tuen Mun Ferry Pier | 615 | Fung Nin Road towards Yuen Long |
| Ping Shan towards Tin Yat | 761P | Fung Nin Road towards Yuen Long |
Location
- Location within MTR

Shui Pin Wai (Chinese: 水邊圍) is an at-grade MTR Light Rail stop located at Castle Peak Road in Yuen Long District, near Shui Pin Wai Estate. It began service on 18 September 1988 and belongs to Zone 5. It serves Shui Pin Wai Estate, Yuen Long Stadium and Yuen Long Park.

== See also ==
- Shui Pin Wai
