= Single Parents Wellbeing =

Support organisation for single parents in Wales

Single Parents Wellbeing CIC
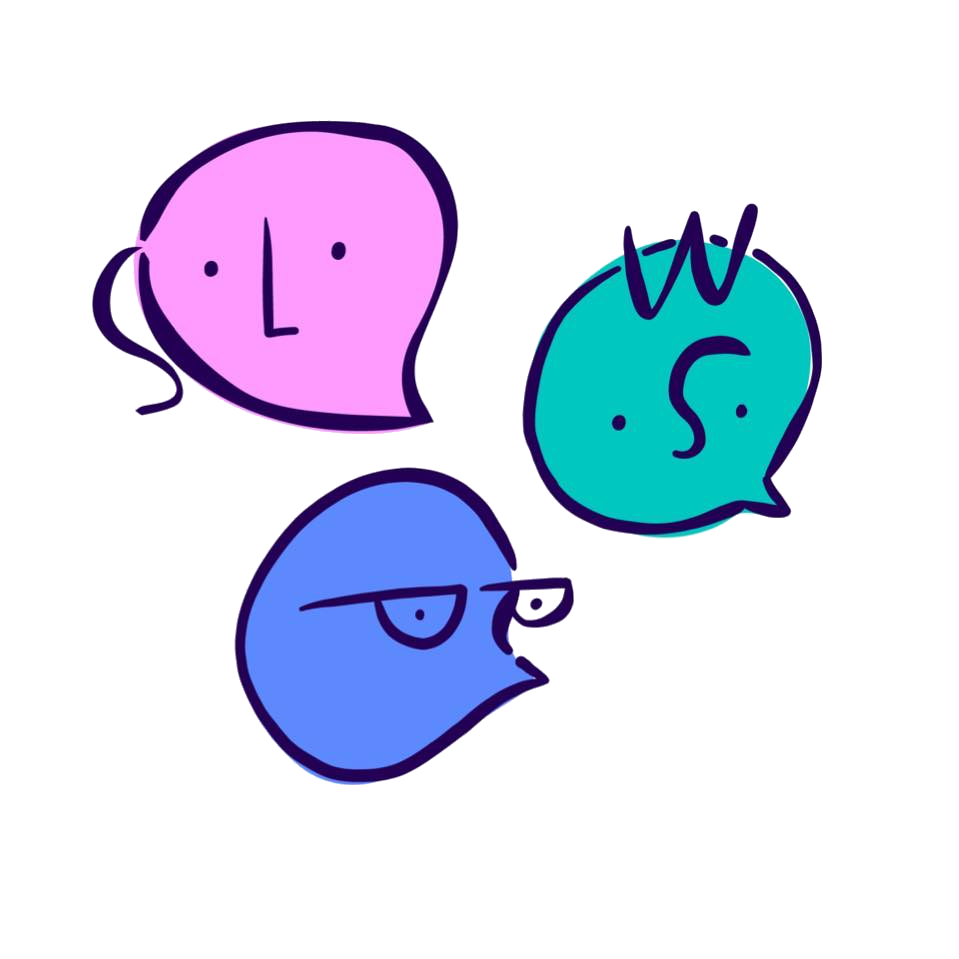
- Logo used since establishment
- Formation: December 7, 2017; 8 years ago
- Founder: Amy Holland; Rachel Cule
- Purpose: Support for single parents in Wales
- Headquarters: Cardiff, Wales
- Website: www.singleparentswellbeing.com

Single Parents Wellbeing CIC, also referred to as Single Parents Wales, (Note: Also abbreviated as SPW) is a Welsh community interest company (CIC). Based in Cardiff, it supports single parents through peer support, fundraising programmes, and workshops. The organisation focuses on improving mental health and reducing loneliness among single-parent families.

== History ==
Single Parents Wellbeing CIC was founded by Amy Holland and her friend, Rachel Cule, on 7 December 2017, in Cardiff, Wales. Originally a walking group, the organisation has more than 2,000 members as of 2022.

== Recognition and funding ==
In 2017, the organisation received a £5,000 grant from the National Lottery Community Fund. Later, the organisation secured £1,400,000 funding from the same community fund, as well as a £900,000 contract.
