= Chung Uk Tsuen (Tuen Mun District) =

Walled village in Hong Kong

Chung Uk Tsuen Chinese: 鍾屋村
- Village
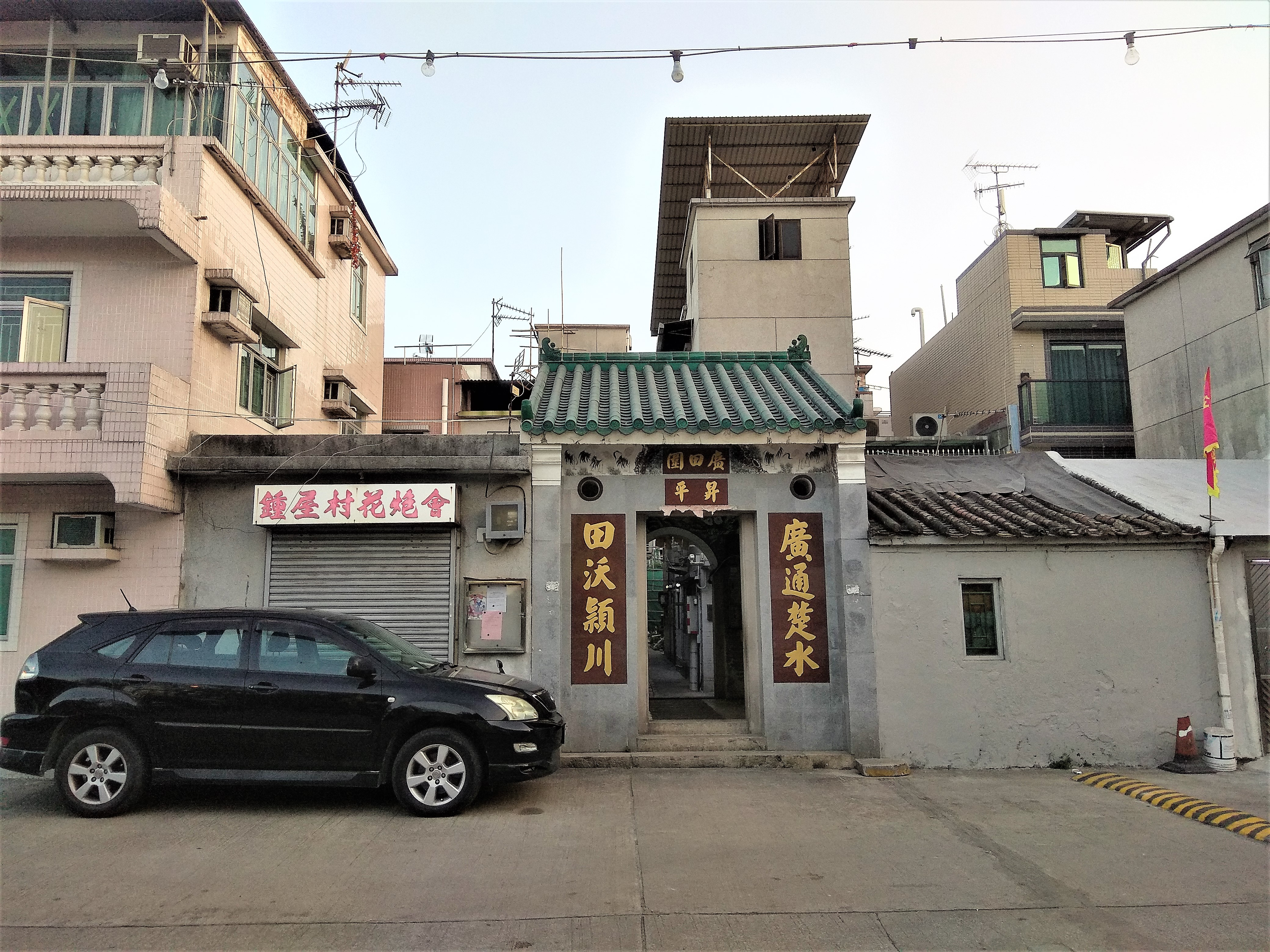
- Entrance gate of Chung Uk Tsuen

- Location within Hong Kong
- Coordinates: 22.428791°N 113.992418°E
- Country: People's Republic of China
- Special administrative region: Hong Kong
- District: Tuen Mun
- Area: Lam Tei
- Time zone: UTC+8:00 (HKT)

Chung Uk Tsuen (Chinese: 鍾屋村) a.k.a. Kwong Tin Wai (廣田圍) is a walled village in Lam Tei, Tuen Mun District, Hong Kong.

== Administration ==
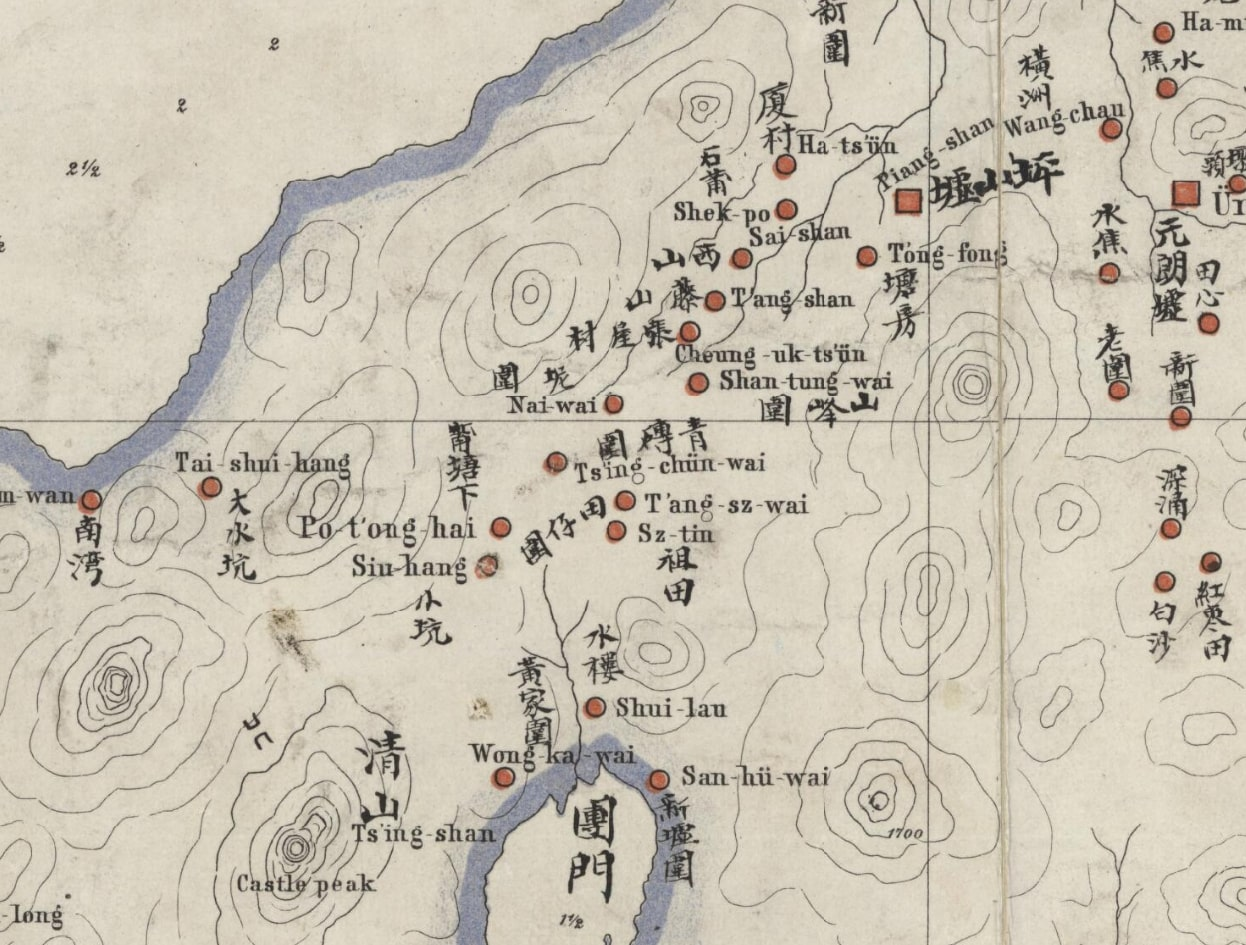
Chung Uk Tsuen on the "Map of the San-On District" by Simeone Volonteri (1866).

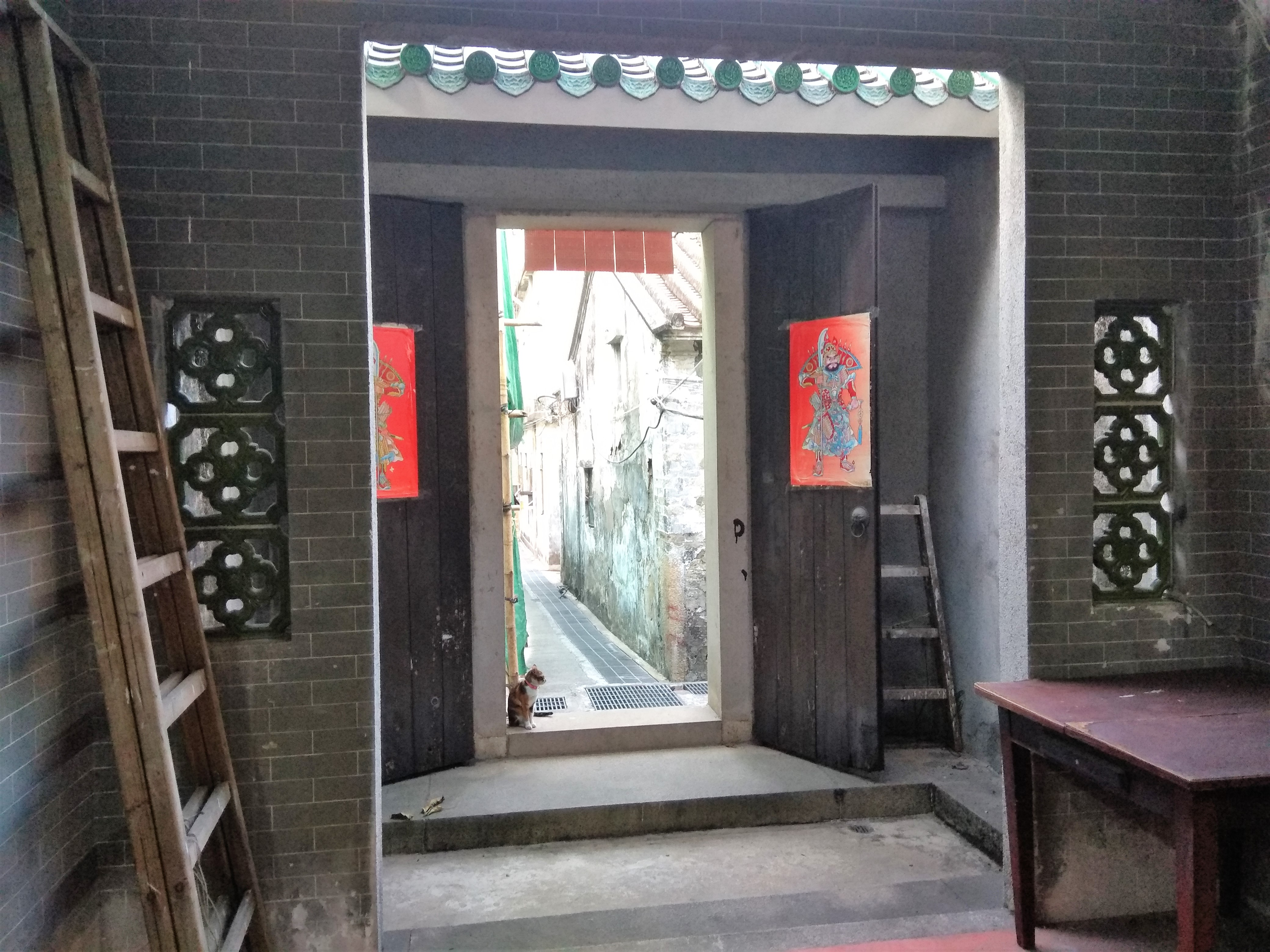
Village shrine.

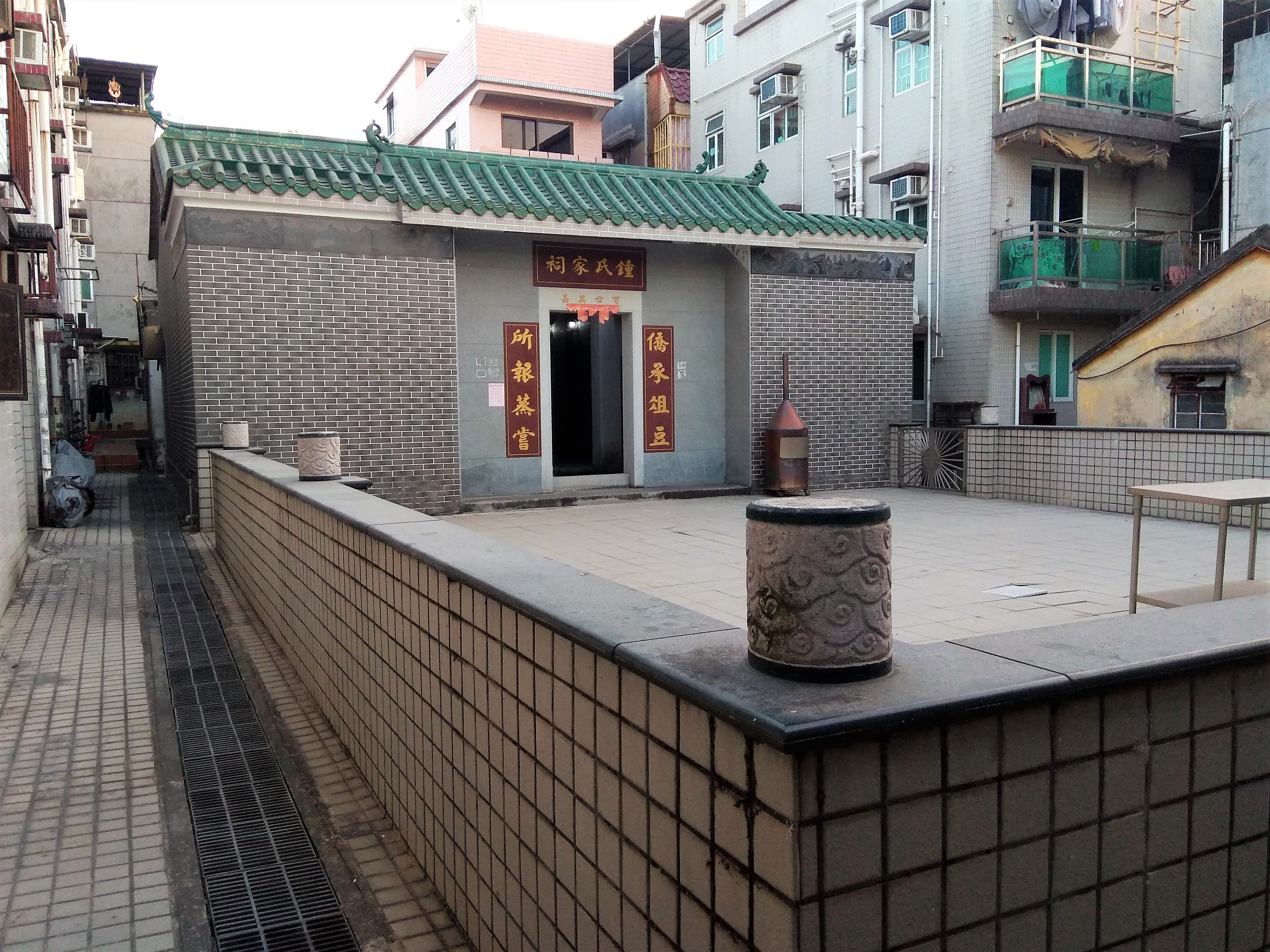
Chung Ancestral Hall (鍾氏宗祠) in Chung Uk Tsuen.

Chung Uk Tsuen is a recognized village under the New Territories Small House Policy. It is one of the 36 villages represented within the Tuen Mun Rural Committee. For electoral purposes, Chung Uk Tsuen is part of the Tuen Mun Rural constituency, which is currently represented by Kenneth Cheung Kam-hung.

== History ==
The Chungs of Chung Uk Tsuen moved from Dongguan during the Ming dynasty.

Tsing Chuen Wai appears on the "Map of the San-On District", published in 1866 by Simeone Volonteri.

== Education ==
Chung Uk Tsuen is in Primary One Admission (POA) School Net 70. Within the school net are multiple aided schools (operated independently but funded with government money) and the following government schools: Tuen Mun Government Primary School (屯門官立小學).

== See also ==
- Walled villages of Hong Kong
- Chung Uk Tsuen stop
