= MTR Bus =

Public bus service operated by the MTR corporation

MTR Bus 港鐵巴士

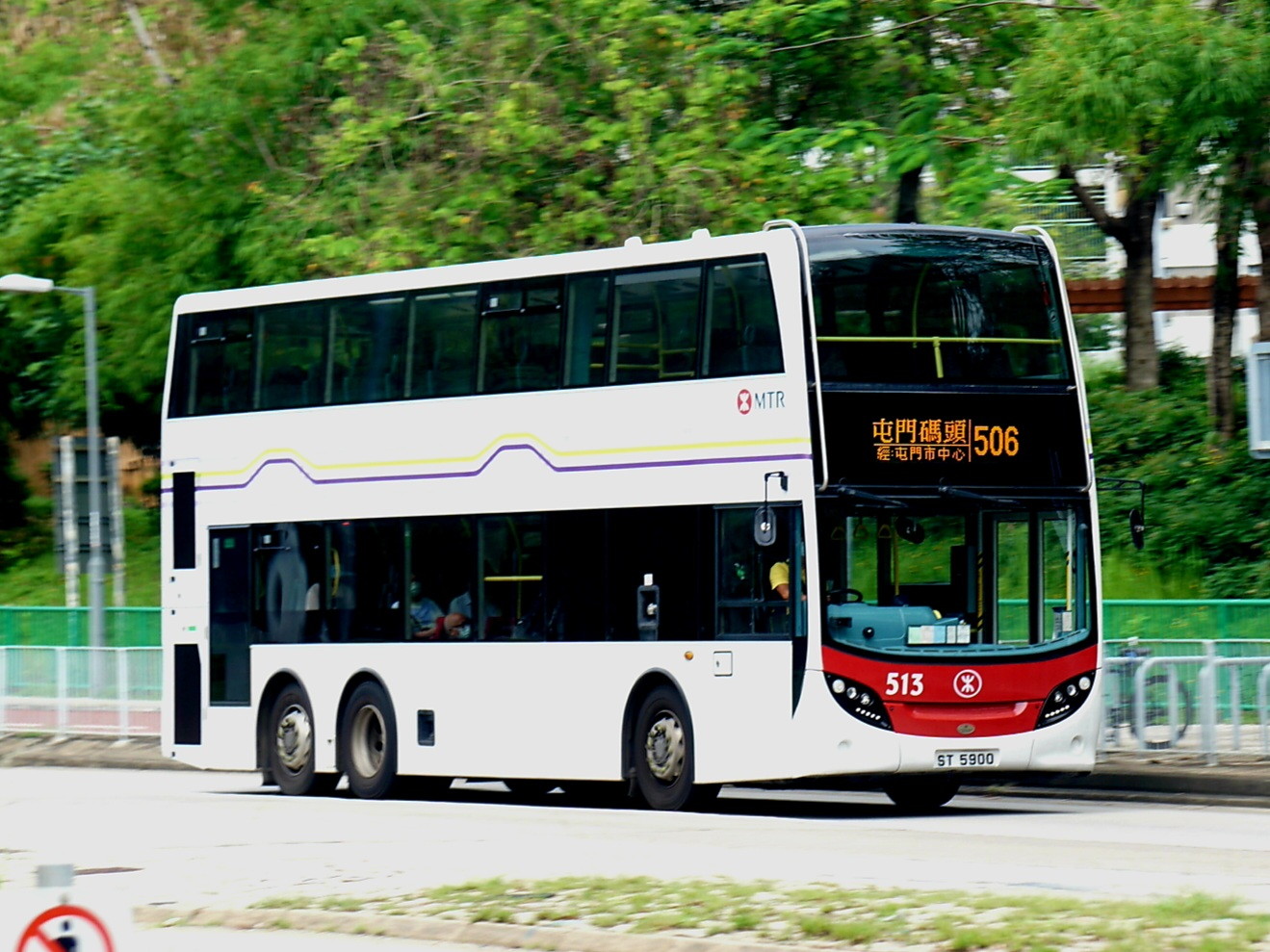
- An Alexander Dennis Enviro500 MMC serving on MTR Bus route 506
- Parent: MTR Corporation
- Founded: 2 December 2007
- Service area: Tuen Mun District; Yuen Long District
- Service type: Non-franchised bus service
- Routes: 22
- Fleet: 165 (December 2020)
- Daily ridership: 51 million annually (2019)
- Fuel type: Diesel; Electricity
- Website: www.mtr.com.hk

MTR Bus
- Traditional Chinese: 港鐵巴士
- Simplified Chinese: 港铁巴士
Transcriptions
Standard Mandarin
- Hanyu Pinyin: Gǎngtiě bāshì
Yue: Cantonese
- Jyutping: gong^{2} tit^{3} baa^{1} si^{2}

MTR Feeder Bus
- Traditional Chinese: 港鐵接駁巴士
- Simplified Chinese: 港铁接驳巴士
Transcriptions
Standard Mandarin
- Hanyu Pinyin: Gǎngtiě jiēbó bāshì
Yue: Cantonese
- Jyutping: gong^{2} tit^{3} zip^{3} bok^{3} baa^{1} si^{2}

MTR Bus (legally Northwest Transit Service Area Bus Service) is a public non-franchised bus service in Hong Kong operated by the MTR Corporation, serving the northwestern part of the New Territories. It comprises a network of 22 feeder bus routes for the convenience of passengers using the MTR rapid transit network, providing access to and between many MTR stations on the Tuen Ma line and Light Rail.

The service carried approximately 51 million passengers in 2019 and is integrated with MTR's fare system to allow Tuen Ma line and Light Rail passengers who use Octopus cards to enjoy the free feeder bus services that link many housing estates along these lines. Along with the Light Rail, the MTR Bus service also plays an important role in the internal transport network of Tuen Mun, Yuen Long and Tin Shui Wai.

The similarly named MTR Feeder Bus refers to feeder bus routes connecting to East Rail line. Currently only 4 MTR Feeder Bus routes serving Tai Po Market station are in operation. While also managed by MTR Corporation's Bus Operations division, the MTR Feeder Bus routes are franchised bus routes under Kowloon Motor Bus's franchise.

== History ==
In the 1980s, the Kowloon-Canton Railway Corporation (KCRC) undertook the construction of operation of a Light Rail Transit (LRT) system in Northwest New Territories. To ensure the financial viability of the LRT system as much as possible, the Hong Kong government established the Northwest Transit Service Area (TSA; 西北鐵路服務範圍, commonly known as 輕鐵專區) within which the KCRC would monopolise all internal public transport services. Upon the commissioning of the LRT system, the incumbent operator Kowloon Motor Bus (KMB) had to withdraw from all internal routes it was operating in the area, and external routes could not carry passengers travelling solely within the area.

As the TSA also covers housing estates and remote settlements not directly served by the LRT network, the KCRC believed that it was advantageous for the Corporation itself to have full control of the bus operations that would perform feeder functions to its railways. It was against this backdrop that the KCRC established a Bus Division in 1986, and placed an order for 31 MCW Metrobus double deckers with Metro Cammell Weymann. The KCR Bus service started operation on 6 September 1987 when it took over route 59B (Siu Hong Court to Butterfly Estate) from KMB. The KCRC gradually built up its own bus fleet, and as the LRT service came into operation on 18 September 1988, more of KMB's Tuen Mun and Yuen Long routes were transferred to the KCRC.

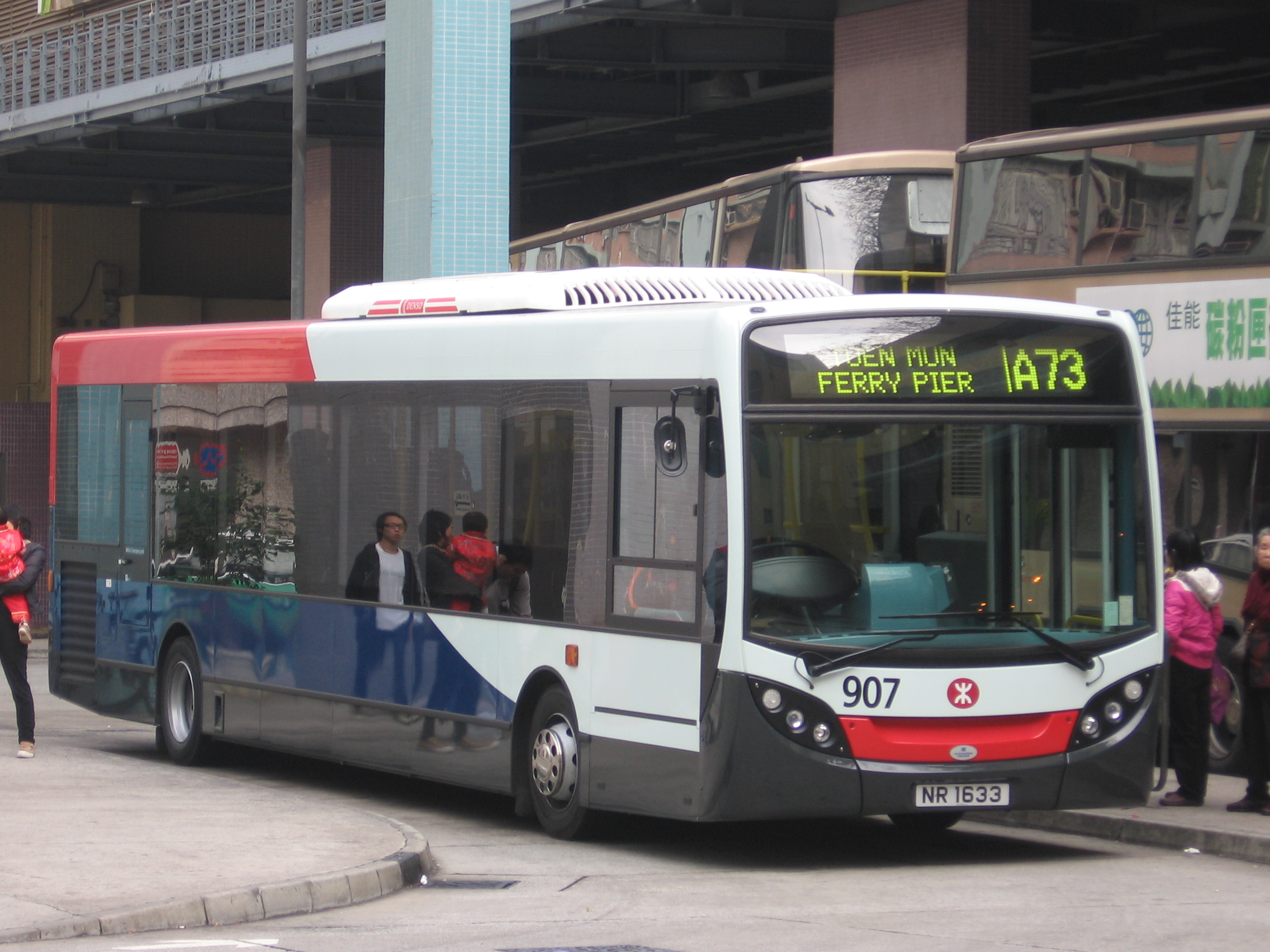
Alexander Dennis Enviro200 on MTR Feeder Bus route A73

Since the commencement of LRT service, the KCR Bus service had primarily played the role of linking remote housing estates and rural settlements such as Tai Lam and Tai Tong to the LRT network. Free interchange was offered to LRT passengers transferring to feeder bus routes, and vice versa. The KCRC Bus Division also operated auxiliary routes that supplements the inadequacies of the LRT service. These A-prefixed routes did not offer interchange concession to LRT passengers. By the mid-1990s, two express bus routes (K1X, K2X) connecting Yuen Long and Tin Shui Wai to the Tuen Mun Ferry Pier were established to encourage residents to make use of the hovercraft service to Central, in order to alleviate the traffic conditions along the heavily overloaded Tuen Mun Road.

When the KCR West Rail (later MTR West Rail line and now part of Tuen Ma line) commenced service in 2003, the KCR Bus service took up the new role of being the feeder transport of the new rail link. The existing feeder and auxiliary bus network were reorganised.

On 2 December 2007, the transport operations of the MTR Corporation and the KCRC were merged. The MTRC took over the KCR Bus service and renamed it "MTR Bus".

== Legal status ==
The Kowloon-Canton Railway Corporation (KCRC) is, according to the provisions of the Kowloon-Canton Railway Corporation Ordinance (Cap. 372), authorised to operate bus services within the North-west Transit Service Area (TSA), and is also allowed to charge fares from passengers of such service. Under the Service Concession Agreement entered into between KCRC and the MTR Corporation (MTRC), the former's rights to operate bus services within the TSA has been granted to the MTRC, as an arrangement enshrined in the Mass Transit Railway Ordinance (Cap. 556).

== Network ==
=== MTR Bus ===
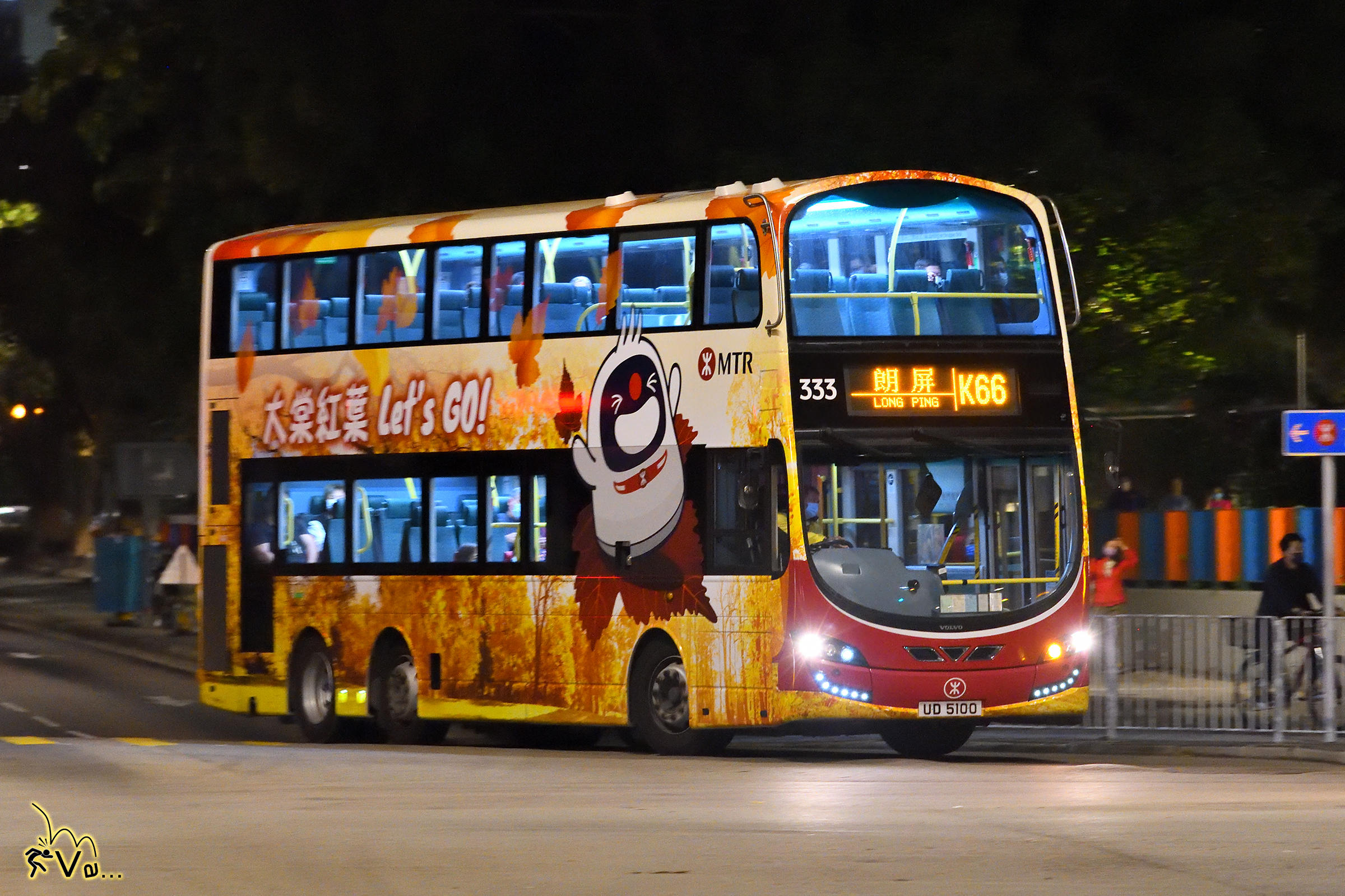
The "T Chai Red Leaves Bus" special livery promoting the special routes for Tai Tong Sweet Gum Woods

As of January 2023, MTR Bus operates a total of 20 regular routes, including 9 serving Tuen Mun District and another 11 serving Yuen Long District. All existing MTR Bus routes are prefixed with K (e.g. K51, K75A) with the sole exception of route 506, which was once a Light Rail route and retained its original numbering after its conversion into a bus service.

These routes all serve at least one of the following Tuen Ma line stations: Tuen Mun, Siu Hong, Tin Shui Wai, Long Ping and Yuen Long, as well as several Light Rail stops. Passengers may enjoy free travel on MTR Bus routes (except K52A (Note: Due to its length, route K52A running between Tuen Mun Station and Tsang Tsui Columbarium charges double the fare of all other MTR Bus routes. Passengers transferring between railway and route K52A buses could only enjoy interchange discount equivalent to half-fare.)) if they transfer to or from Tuen Ma line or Light Rail using the same Octopus card.

Special routes are also operated in winter for those flocking to the sweet gum woods in Tai Tong, when the leaves there turn red.

=== MTR Feeder Bus ===
The MTR Feeder Bus service currently comprises 4 routes. All existing routes connect to Tai Po Market Station and are confined to serving within Tai Po District.

== Fleet ==
As of November 2023, the MTR Bus fleet is composed of 172 buses. The majority of the fleet are diesel-powered double deckers, consisting of the following models:

Electric

- Alexander Dennis Enviro500EV

Diesel

- Alexander Dennis Enviro400
- Alexander Dennis Enviro500
- Alexander Dennis Enviro500 MMC
- Volvo B9TL
- Alexander Dennis Enviro200

Buses that were formerly operated includes the Leyland Olympian, Volvo Olympian, Volvo B10M, MCW Metrobus, and Dennis Trident 3
