= Hochschule für Musik und Theater =

Hochschule für Musik und Theater may refer to:

- Hochschule für Musik und Theater Hamburg
- Hochschule für Musik, Theater und Medien Hannover, formerly Hochschule für Musik und Theater Hannover
- University of Music and Theatre Leipzig
- Hochschule für Musik und Theater München
- Hochschule für Musik und Theater Rostock
- Zürcher Hochschule der Künste, a merger (2007) of the former Hochschule für Musik und Theater and Hochschule für Gestaltung und Kunst

== See also ==
- List of university and college schools of music
