= Shui Pin Wai Estate =

Public housing estate in Yuen Long, Hong Kong

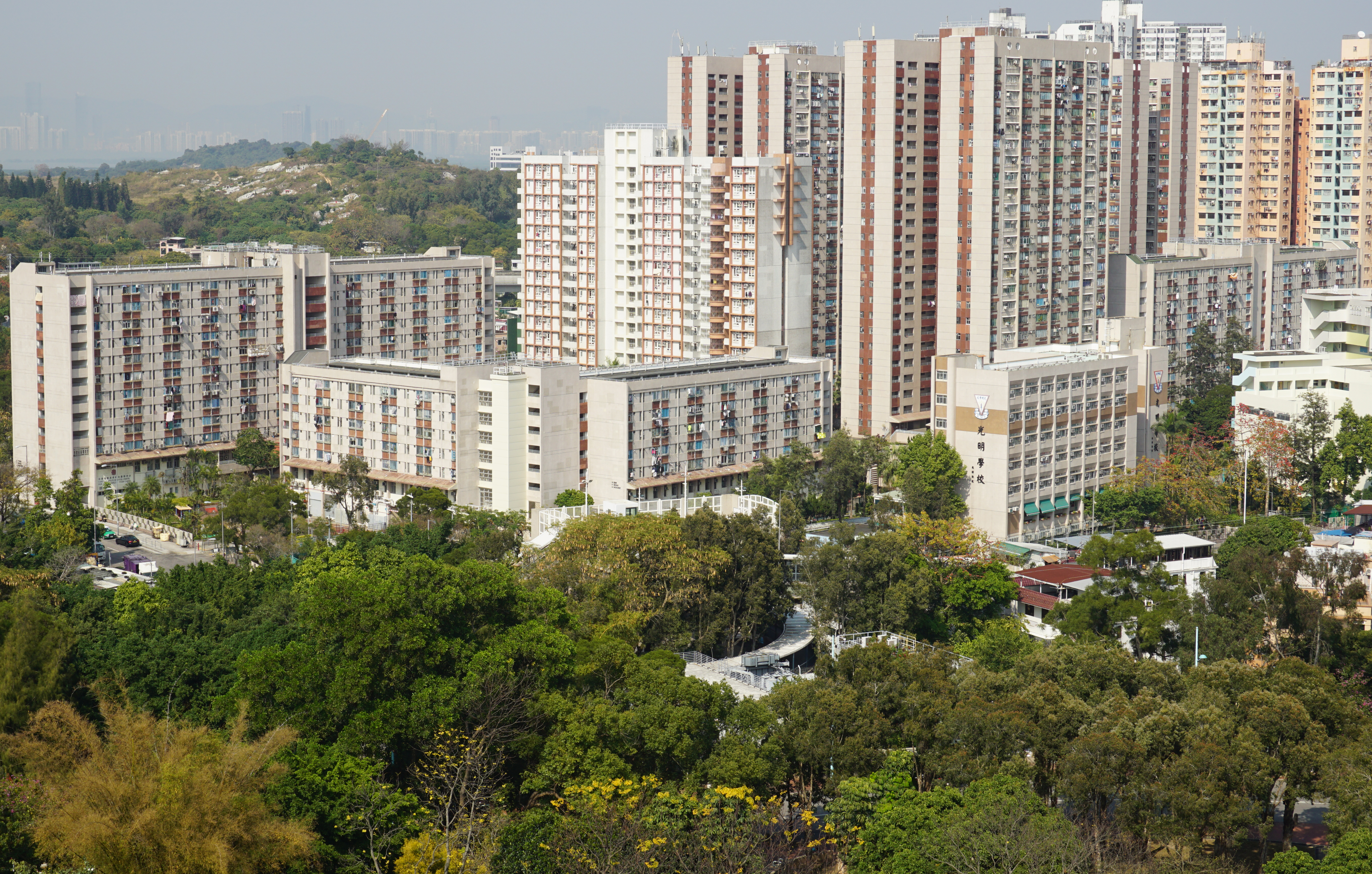
- Shui Pin Wai Estate
- Interactive map of Shui Pin Wai Estate

General information
- Location: 17 Ma Miu Road, Yuen Long; New Territories, Hong Kong
- Coordinates: 22.44567°N 114.02013°E
- Status: Completed
- Category: Public rental housing
- Population: 6,725 (2016)
- No. of blocks: 7
- No. of units: 2,394

Construction
- Constructed: 1981; 45 years ago
- Authority: Hong Kong Housing Authority

Shui Pin Wai Estate (Chinese: 水邊圍邨) is a public housing estate in Yuen Long Town, New Territories, Hong Kong, near Light Rail Shui Pin Wai stop. It is the second public housing estate in Yuen Long Town and consists of seven residential buildings mainly built in 1981, but one of the blocks, Dip Shui House, was later built in 1998.

== Houses ==
Name	Chinese name	Building type	Completed
Bik Shui House	碧水樓	Old Slab	1981
Ying Shui House	盈水樓	Old Slab	1981
Woo Shui House	湖水樓	Old Slab	1981
San Shui House	山水樓	Single H	1981
Chuen Shui House	泉水樓	Single H	1981
Hong Shui House	康水樓	Single H	1981
Dip Shui House	疊水樓	Small Household Block	1998

== Demographics ==
According to the 2016 by-census, Shui Pin Wai Estate had a population of 6,725. The median age was 55.8 and the majority of residents (94.4 per cent) were of Chinese ethnicity. The average household size was 2.5 people. The median monthly household income of all households (i.e. including both economically active and inactive households) was HK$19,000.

== Politics ==
Shui Pin Wai Estate is located in Shui Pin constituency of the Yuen Long District Council. It is currently represented by Lai Kwok-wing, who was elected in the 2019 elections.

== See also ==
- Public housing estates in Yuen Long
