= Bus services in Hong Kong =

Transportation service in Hong Kong

Bus services in Hong Kong have a long history. As of 2023, four companies operate franchised public bus services. There are also a variety of non-franchised public bus services, including feeder bus services to railway stations operated by MTR, and residents' services for residential estates (particularly those in the New Territories).

== Current situation ==
Bus services in Hong Kong can be roughly divided into three types: franchised buses, non-franchised buses and public light buses.

=== Franchised bus ===
As of 2023, there are four privately owned bus companies providing franchised bus services across Hong Kong, operating more than 700 routes with some 5,800 buses. Hong Kong is one of the few cities in the world that bus services are not operated or owned by the Government.

These are the four franchised bus companies in Hong Kong:

- Kowloon Motor Bus Company (1933) Limited

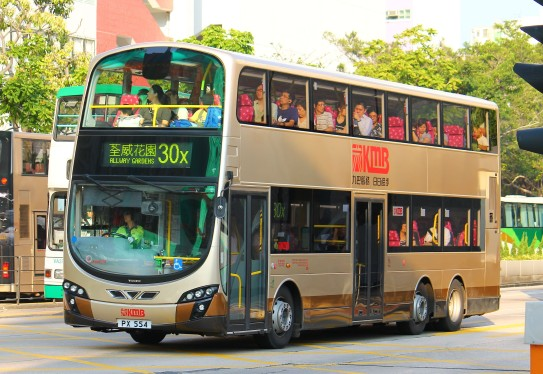
Kowloon Motor Bus

Mainly provides service in Kowloon and New Territories, operating about 400 routes with about 3,850 buses. Some of them are cross-harbour routes, either solely operated or jointly operated with Citybus.

- Citybus Limited

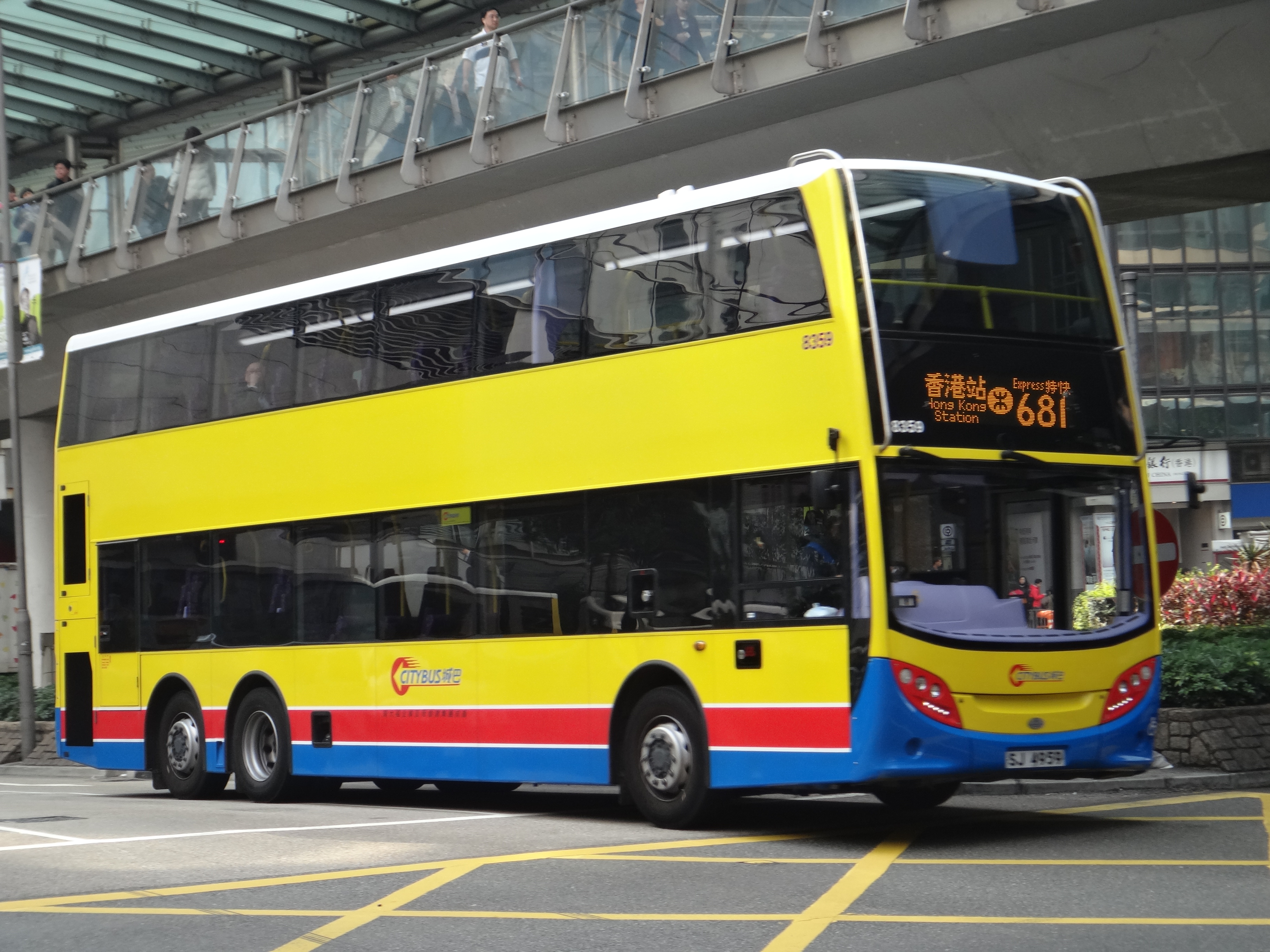
Citybus

Mainly provides service on Hong Kong Island, operates 197 bus routes, including 106 Hong Kong Island routes, 63 cross-harbour routes, 9 Kowloon and New Territories routes and 19 routes to Tung Chung/Airport. It operates 1,168 buses.

- Long Win Bus Company Limited

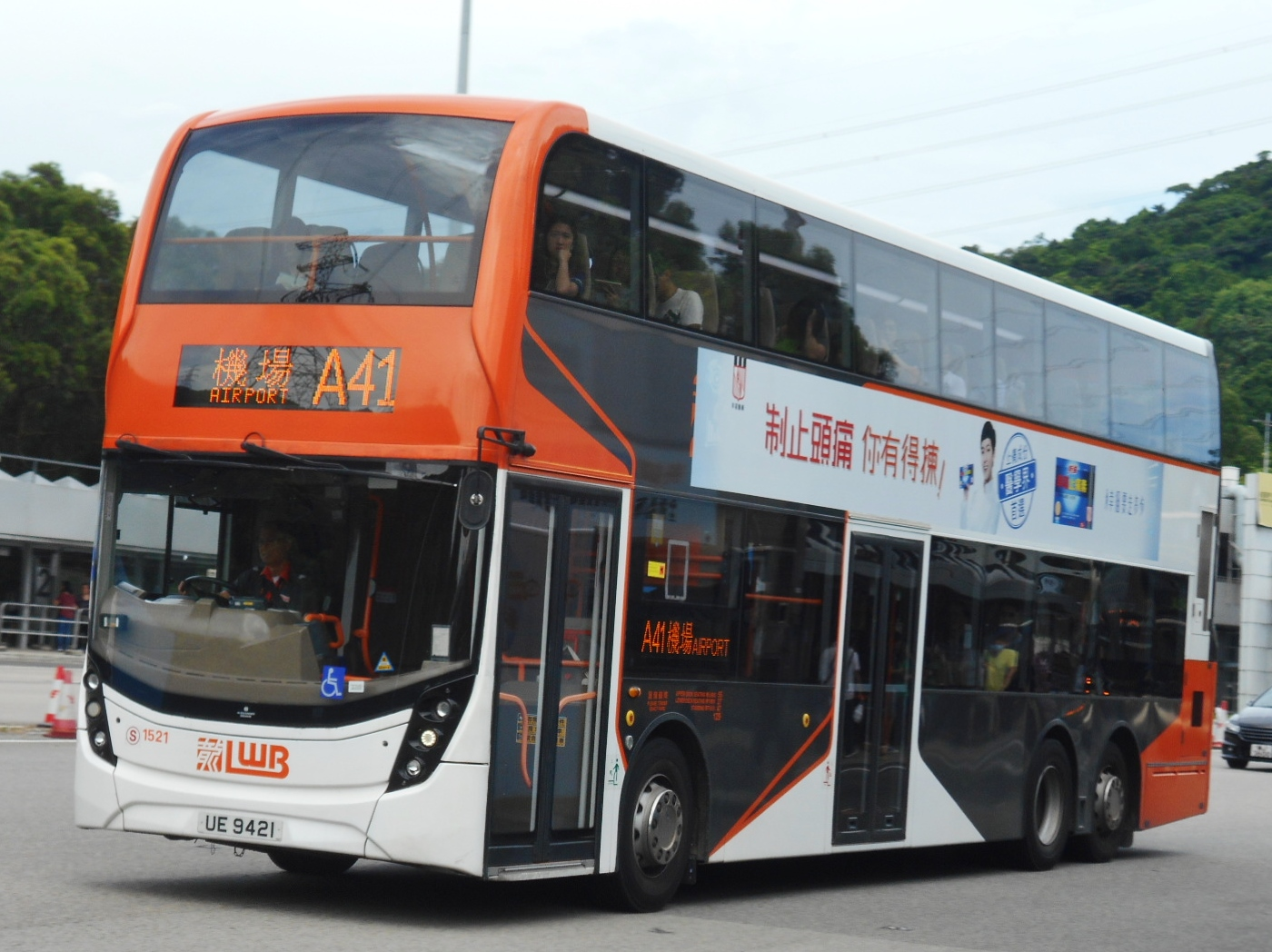
Long Win Bus

Mainly services Tung Chung, Disneyland Resort and routes shuttling between the Airport and New Territories, operating 19 routes with 165 buses.

- New Lantao Bus Company (1973) Limited

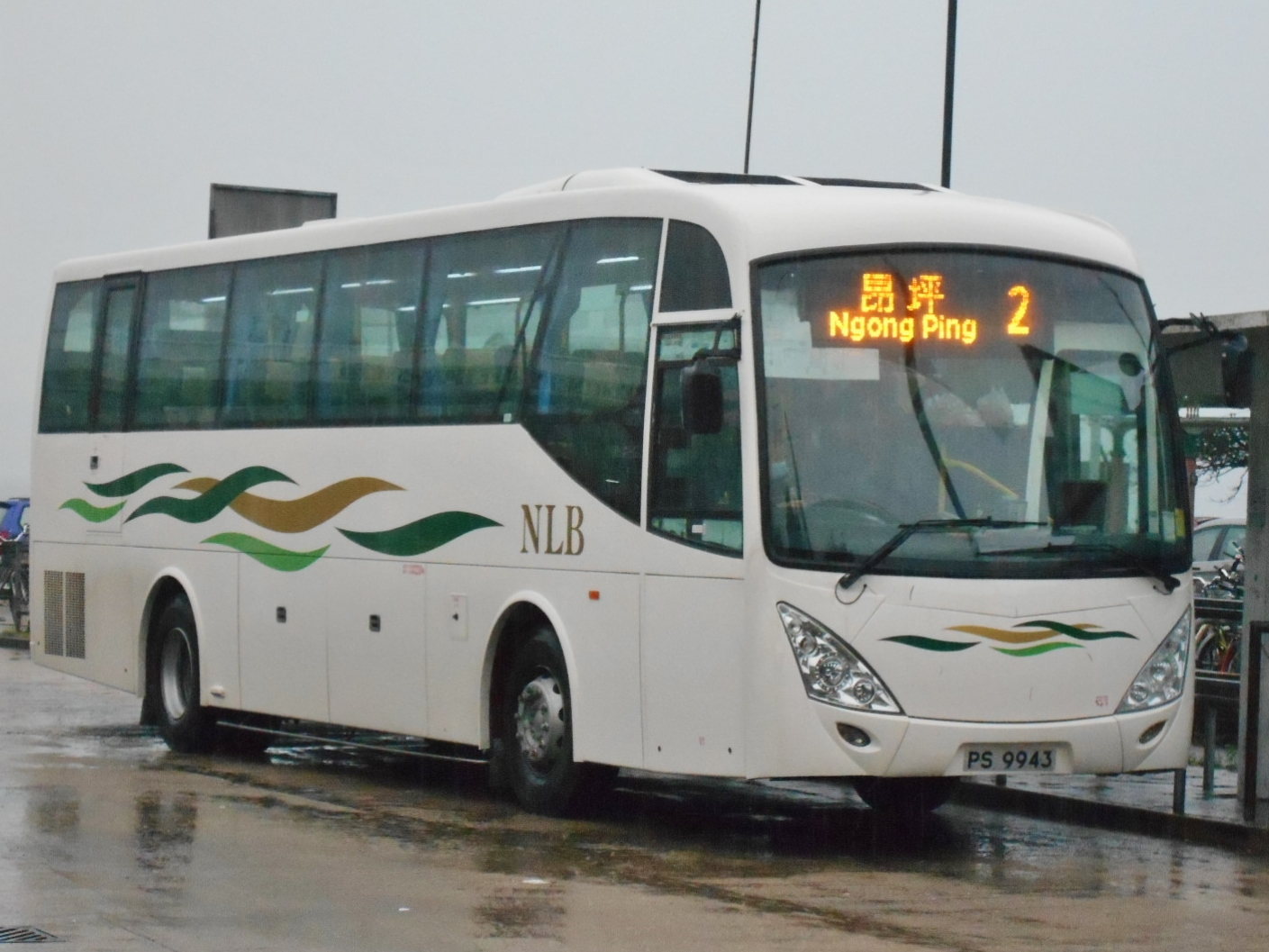
New Lantao Bus

Mainly provides service on Lantau Island, operating 22 Lantau routes and 1 New Territories route with 108 buses.

These companies no longer provides franchise bus service in Hong Kong:

- China Motor Bus Company Limited, franchise expired in 1998

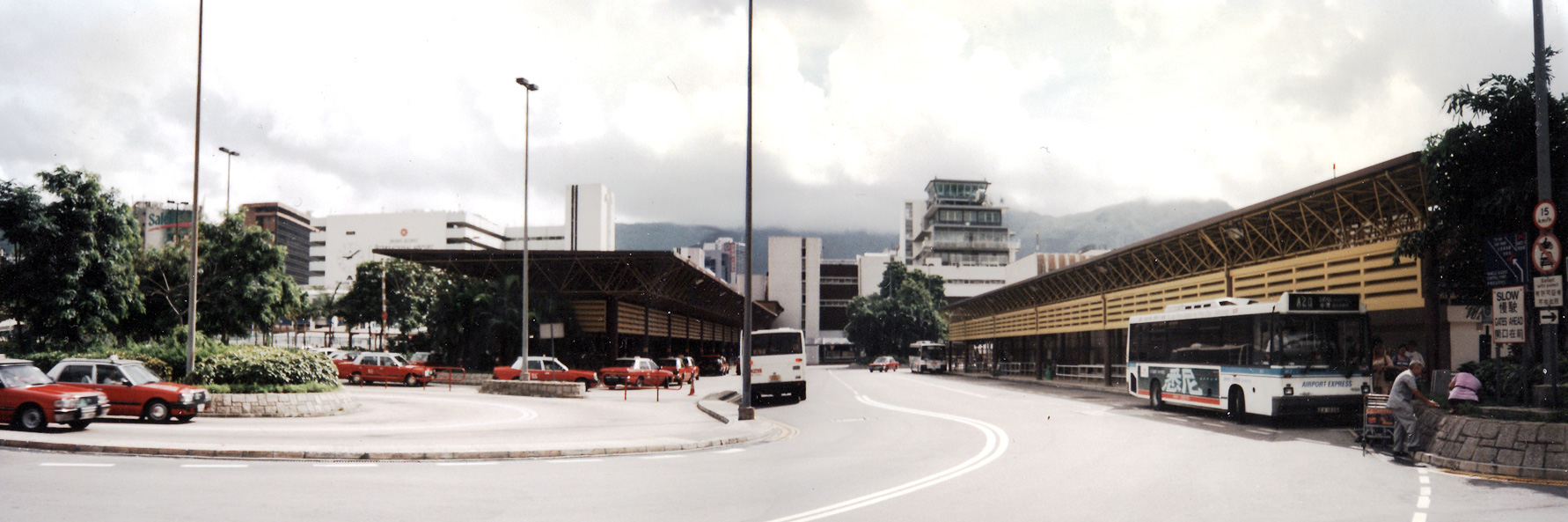
The old A20 bus service at the old airport

- New World First Bus Services Limited, merged to Citybus on 1 July 2023

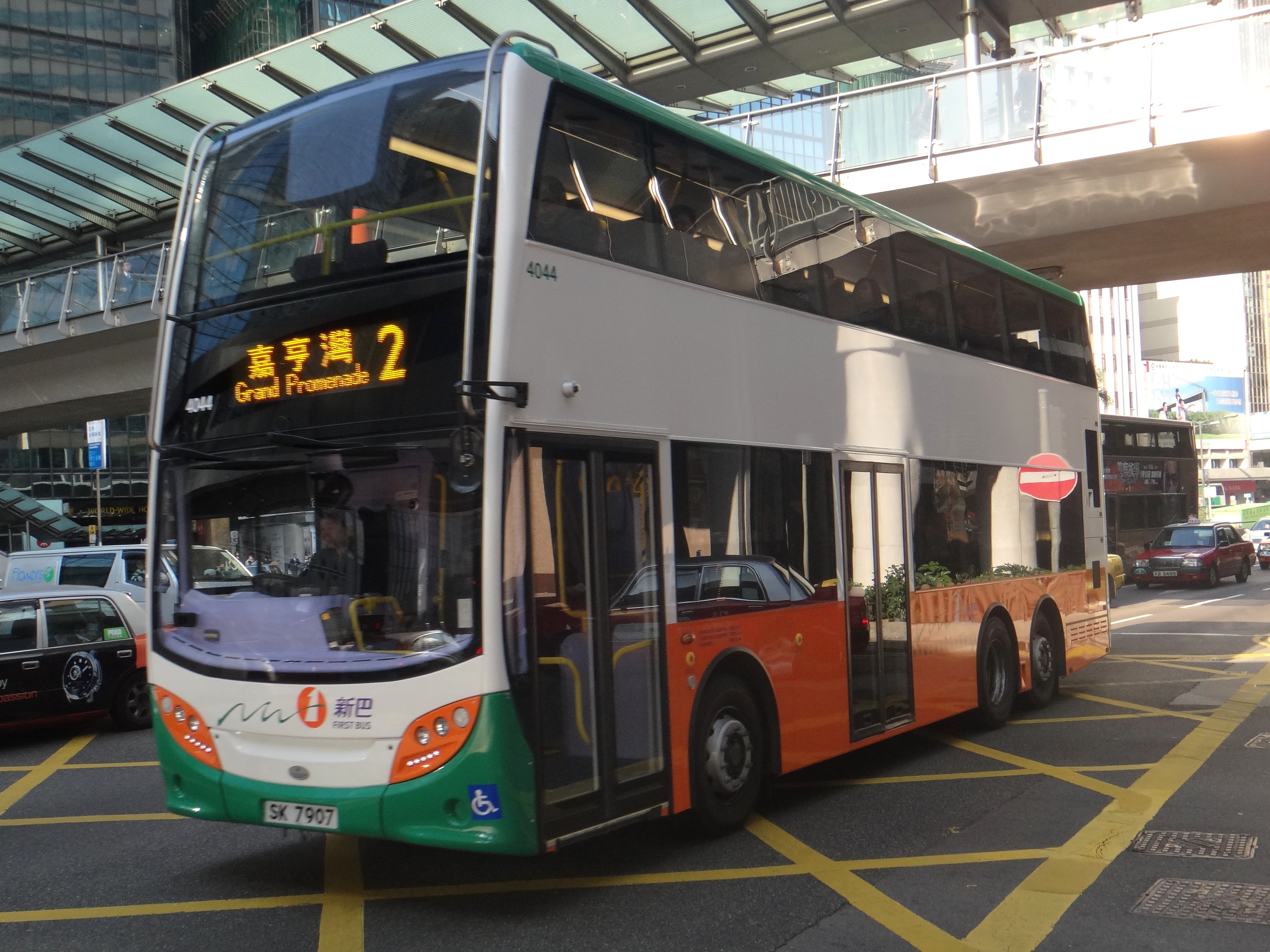
New World First Bus

The Kowloon Motor Bus Company (1933) Limited (KMB) is one of the largest privately owned public bus operators in the world. KMB's fleet consists of about 3,800 buses on 400 routes and a staff of over 12,000. In 1979, Citybus began its operation in Hong Kong with one double-decker, providing shuttle service for the Hong Kong dockyard. It later expanded into operating a residential bus route between City One, Sha Tin and Kowloon Tong MTR station. New World First Bus Services Limited (NWFB) was established in 1998, taking over China Motor Bus's franchise to provide bus services on Hong Kong Island together with Citybus. NWFB's parent company later bought Citybus, but the two companies had basically been operating independently until the two companies merged on 1 July 2023.

Hong Kong franchised bus routes have a fixed path, fare, service hours and schedule. Urban routes mostly operate with double-decker buses, which have become a distinguishing feature of Hong Kong. Passengers are required to pay their bus fare when they board the bus, and all buses accept payment by either Octopus card or cash (or e-payment methods such as credit cards or digital wallet) ; however no change is given for paying by the latter. Some routes such as cross-harbour routes and Disneyland Resort routes are operated jointly by two companies. Fares are distanced-based although longer distances are comparatively cheaper than shorter distance fares on a per km basis. Hong Kong's bus fare system is based on where a passenger boards, e.g., "tap on" but not where a passenger alights, e.g., "tap off". As such, a passenger pays the entire fare upon boarding regardless of point of alighting. Many routes provide "step down fare" after a certain journey distance has been completed, so that those boarding the bus later into its journey would pay less than someone boarding towards the beginning. Some routes may also have a "two way section fare", where passengers paying fare by Octopus Card and only riding a certain section towards the beginning of a route can enjoy a fare rebate by either tapping the Octopus Card on the bus fare reader again before alighting, or at a designated bus stop on the line using the fare rebate machine at the mentioned bus stops of a specific route.

==== Route types ====
There are several types of routes including normal routes, limited-stop routes and express routes.

=== Non-franchised buses ===
The non-franchised bus services of Hong Kong are provided by different private bus companies as a means to relieve the demand on franchised buses and green public minibuses in rush hour. They also serve some remote places which are deemed non-profitable for franchised bus and green public minibus operators to serve. According to the Transport Department, there were 8111 registered non-franchised buses in Hong Kong as of 13 March 2014. Generally speaking, the services are divided into the following categories:

- Tourist services (A01): Known as "Travel bus" (旅遊巴) in daily usage, providing transport services for tourists between tourist attractions.
- Hotel services (A02): operated by hotels or by bus companies, providing transport services for hotel customers.
- School services (A03): operated by schools or by bus companies, providing transport services for students.
- Employee services (A04): operated by different institutes or by bus companies, providing transport services for employees.
- Residential services (A06): Known as "Estate bus" (邨巴) in daily usage, they providing feeder services between new towns and urban areas; they are often applied jointly by management company of private housing estates and bus companies as a mean to carry residents from where they live to major transport interchanges.
- Contract hire services (A08): Hired by a person or groups for transport services.

On the other hand, MTR Corporation also operates some feeder bus routes in Tuen Mun, Tin Shui Wai and Yuen Long to complement its Tuen Ma line and Light Rail services.

=== Public light buses ===
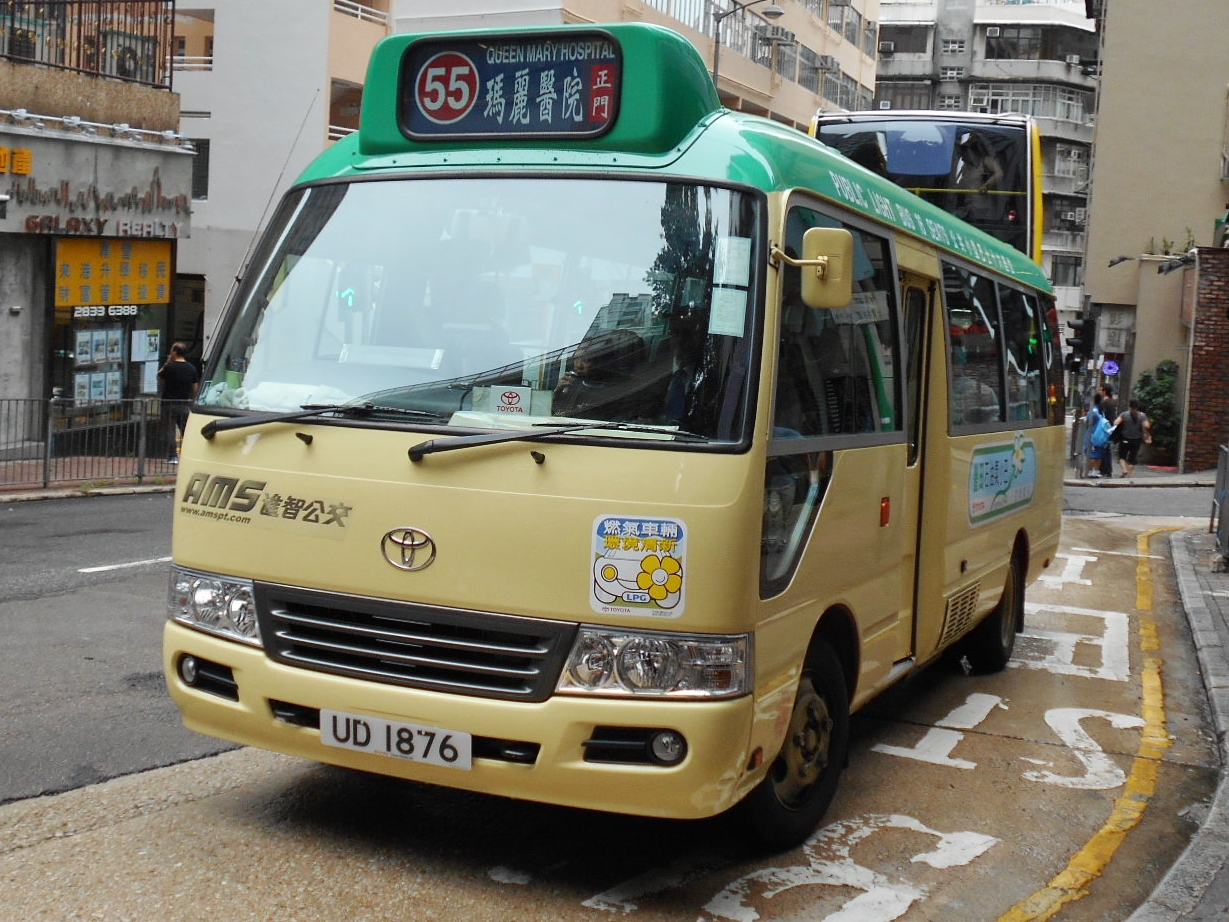
Public light bus

The public light buses in Hong Kong are passenger transport vehicles (minibuses) with a capacity of 16 or 19 passengers (19 seat minibuses were introduced in 2017). The capacity was 14 before the 1980s. They provide feeder services to buses and the railway. There are 4,350 minibuses in Hong Kong and this figure has been capped by the Transport Department as available licences. They can be divided into two types: red public minibuses and green public minibuses. The red public minibuses, which number around 1,200 of the 4,350 do not need to operate on fixed routes or fixed schedules and may charge any fare desired, although special prohibitions apply. Green public minibuses operate on fixed routes in set frequencies stipulated by the Transport Department of Hong Kong. Other kinds of light bus services, for example, the Nanny van transports provided by such van owners during the 1980s are considered illegal beyond their operation routes.

== See also ==
- History of bus transport in Hong Kong
- List of bus routes in Hong Kong
- Hong Kong bus route numbering
