= Tsz Tin Tsuen =

Village in Tuen Mun, Hong Kong

Coordinates: 22.416571°N 113.975413°E

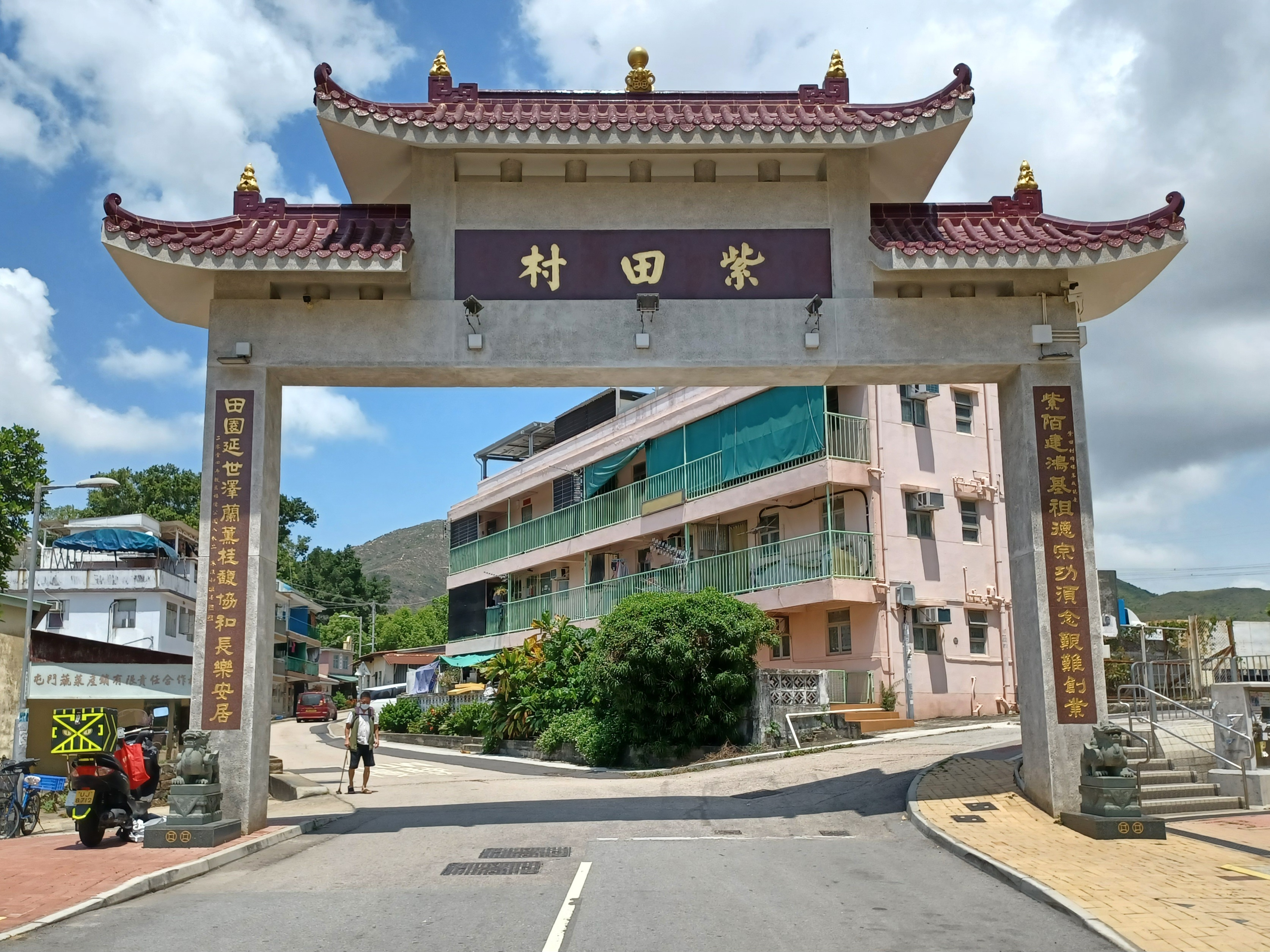
Paifang of Tsz Tin Tsuen.

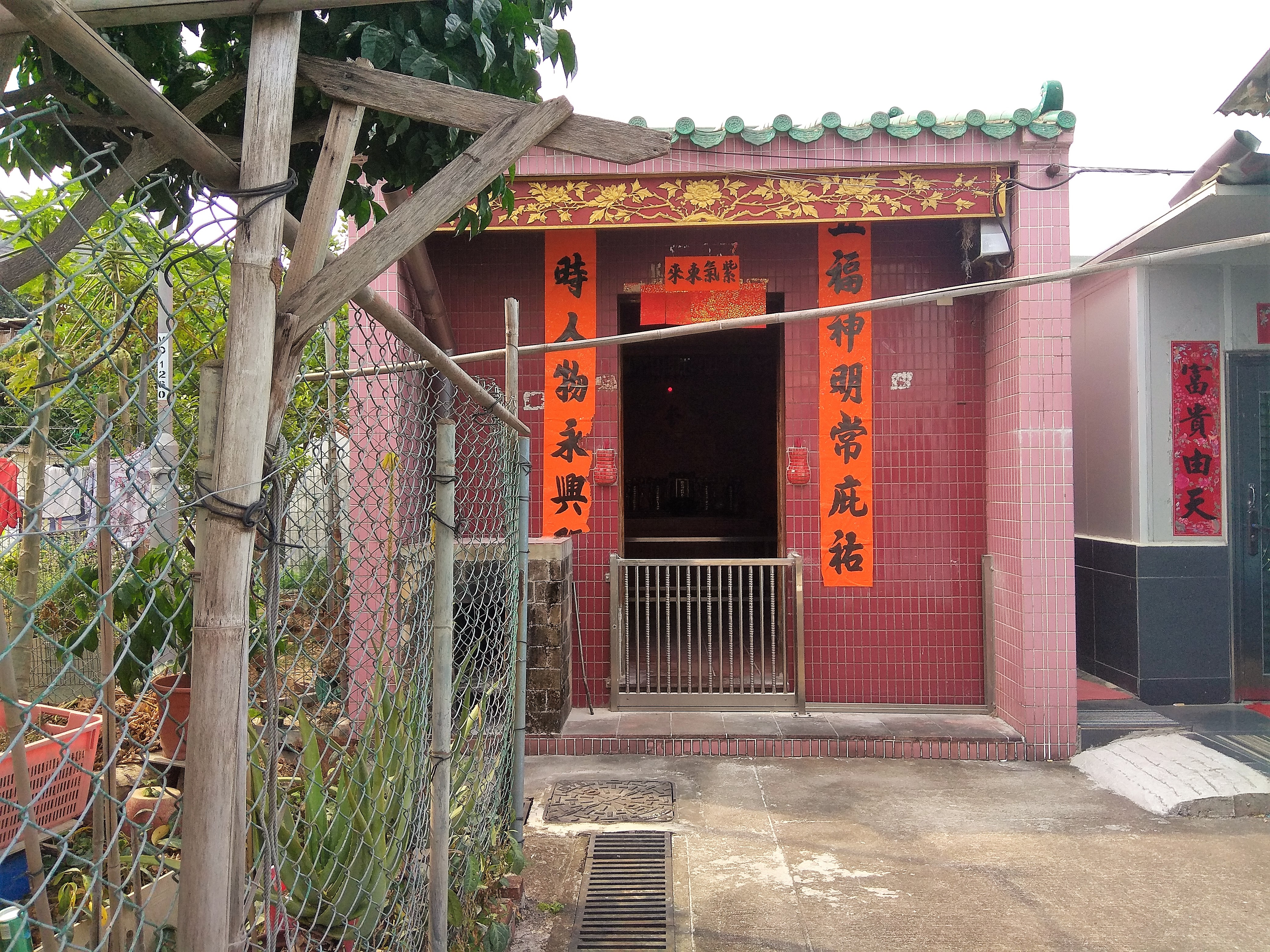
Village shrine of Tsz Tin Wai.

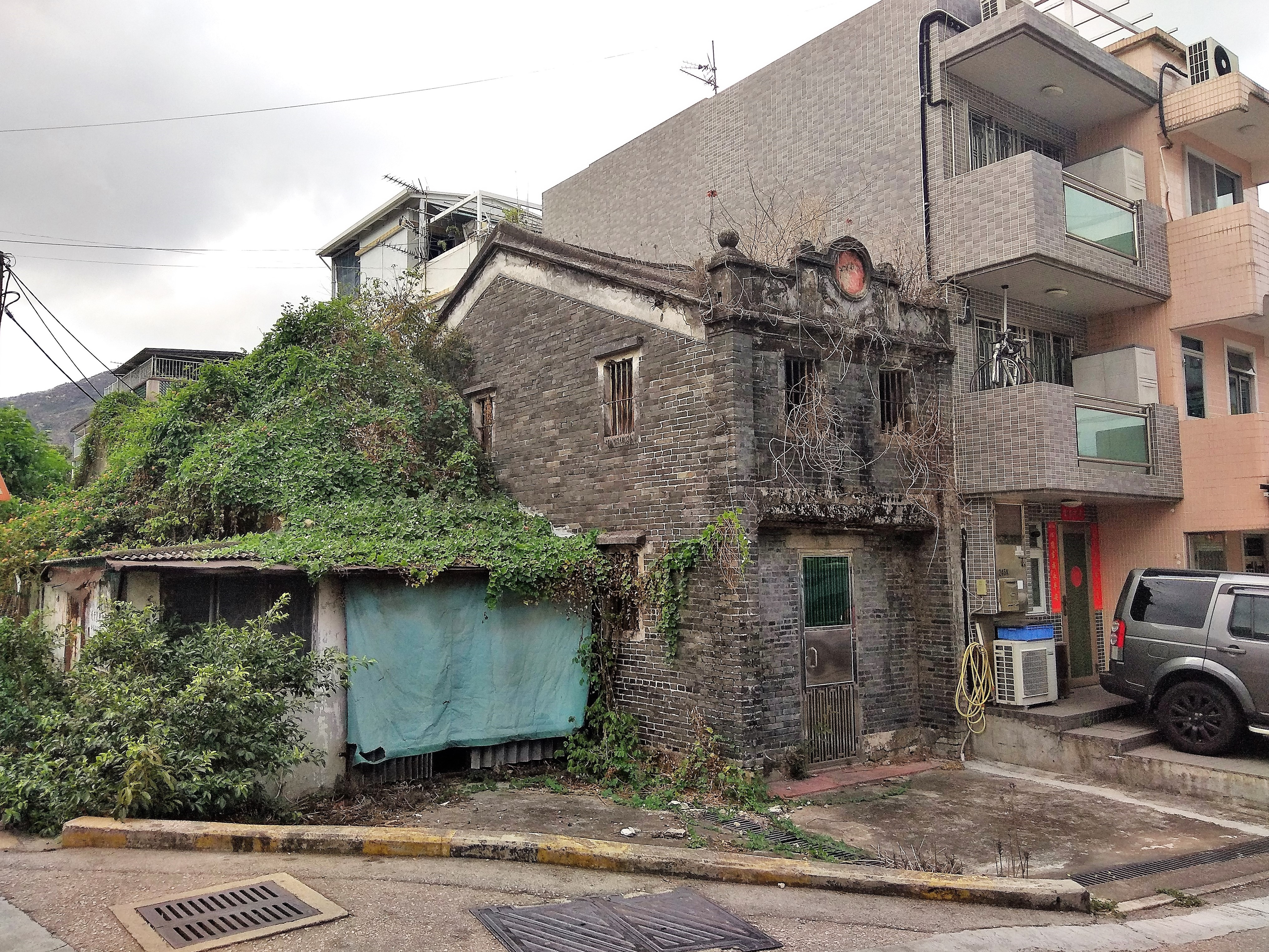
Nos. 245 & 247 Tsz Tin Tsuen.

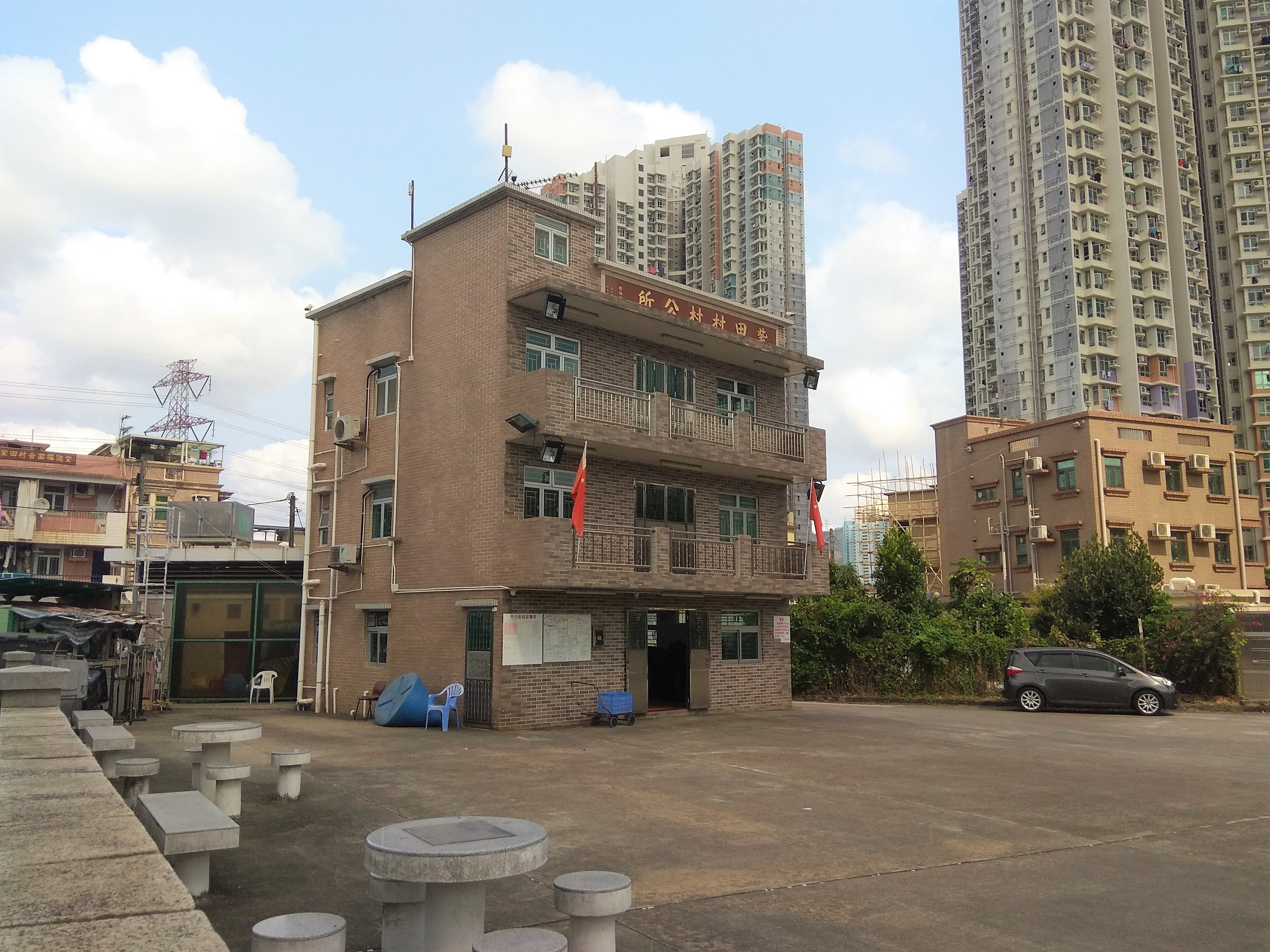
Tsz Tin Tsuen Village Office.

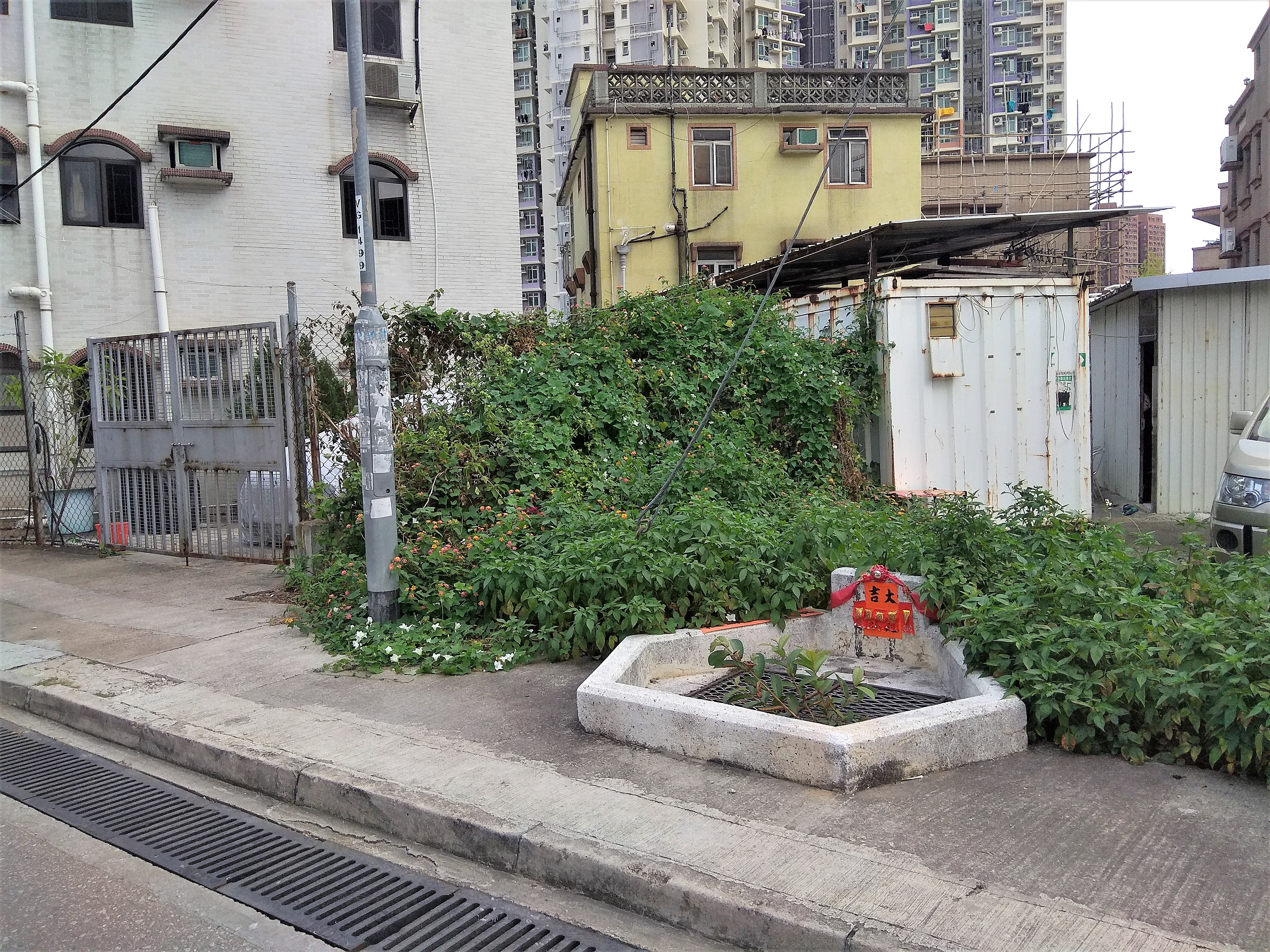
An old water well in Tsz Tin Tsuen.

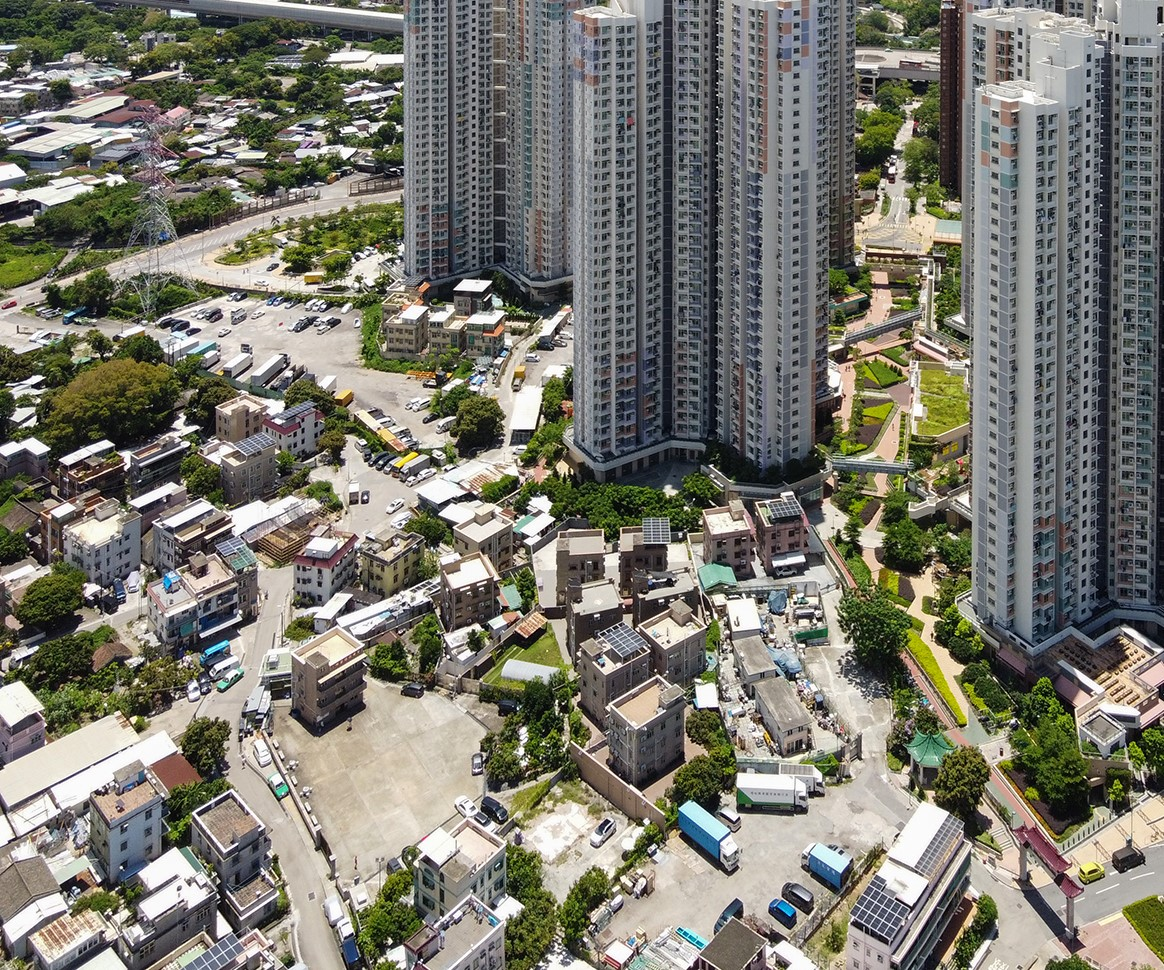
Aerial photograph of Tsz Tin Tsuen and Yan Tin Estate.

Tsz Tin Tsuen (Chinese: 紫田村) is a village in Lam Tei, Tuen Mun District, Hong Kong.

== Administration ==
Tsz Tin Tsuen is a recognized village under the New Territories Small House Policy. It is one of the 36 villages represented within the Tuen Mun Rural Committee. For electoral purposes, Tsz Tin Tsuen is part of the Yan Tin constituency, which is currently represented by Apple Lai Ka-man.

== History ==
According to one source, Tsz Tin Tsuen was first settled by the Lius (廖) during the Ming dynasty (1368-1644) and later by the Tang (鄧), the Chan (陳) and the Mak (麥). Another source mentions that Tsz Tin Wai was founded during the late Ming dynasty by a branch of descendants of Tang Hung-wai of Ha Tsuen. Two brothers of the Tang Clan, Tang Siu-lung (鄧兆瀧) and Tang Siu-wai (鄧兆渭) of the 16th generation, from Ha Tsuen, settled in the village during the Wanli period (1573-1620) of the Ming dynasty.

Tsz Tin Tsuen has historically predominantly been a Tang Clan village, which was historically probably allied to Ha Tsuen in an oath-sworn alliance, although it was not part of the Ha Tsuen Heung (廈村鄉).

The village is included in a 1643/1688 list of villages. It was officially recorded as Tsz Tuen Wai (子屯圍) or Tsz Tuen Wai Tsuen (子屯圍村) in the 1688 and the 1819 versions of the Xin'an Gazetteer. The present name of the village, Tsz Tin Tsuen has probably been in use since 1911.

The Tang of Tsz Tin Tsuen maintain regular contact with their Tang kinsmen in Ha Tsuen by participating in lineage rituals. They still have their ancestral worship conducted at the Tang Ancestral Hall of Ha Tsuen Shi and they take part in the Tai Ping Ching Chiu organized by the Tang of Ha Tsuen.

== Features ==
Tsz Tin Wai (子田圍), which is now engulfed by Tsz Tin Tsuen, is likely to have been a Punti walled village in the past, although it is not confirmed that it was actually walled. Tsz Tin Wai has a village shrine in a style peculiar to Punti walled villages. The shrine is erected at the rear end of a main lane, which roughly divides the village into two halves.

Nos. 245 & 247 Tsz Tin Tsuen has been listed as a Grade III historic building. The two-storey building was built in the early 20th century and before 1918. It was used as a residence and as a grocery store selling wine and grains. A sugar refinery was built at the back of the house.

== See also ==
- Walled villages of Hong Kong
- San Hing Tsuen, a village adjacent to Tsz Tin Tsuen (north east)
- Siu Hang Tsuen, a village adjacent to Tsz Tin Tsuen (south west)
- Yan Tin Estate, a public housing estate adjacent to Tsz Tin Tsuen (south)
