= Waste management in Hong Kong =

In the densely populated Hong Kong, waste is a complex issue. The territory generates around 3,850,000 (3.85 million) tons of waste each year but is able to collect and process only a minimal portion of recyclable waste. By 2019, its existing landfills are expected to be full. The government has introduced waste management schemes and is working to educate the public on the subject. On the commercial side, producers are taking up measures to reduce waste.

== Statistics ==
Hong Kong EPD (Environmental Protection Department) provides data and statistics about waste management.

== Waste management process ==
In Hong Kong, wastes generated can be categorised as municipal solid waste, construction and demolition waste, chemical waste and other special waste, including: clinical waste, animal carcasses, livestock waste, radioactive waste, grease trap waste and waterworks/sewage sludges. According to a 2016 report from Waste Atlas, waste generation in Hong Kong is around 6.4 million tonnes per year or 900 kg/cap/year.

Wastes in Hong Kong are first collected from disposal bins to refuse transfer stations (RTS). After they are compacted and put in containers, they are delivered to disposal lands or recycling centers.

There are hundreds of collectors in the territory where wastes are located before transferring to refuse transfer stations. There are seven refuse transfer stations in the territory. They serve as centralised collection points for the transfer of waste to the strategic landfills.

=== Landfills ===
Operated by the EPD, the landfill sites only accept garbage from Hong Kong. Thirteen of 16 landfills were closed from 1988 to 1996. Starting from 6 January 2016, the South East New Territories Landfill (SENT) will only receive construction waste. Hong Kong has three strategic landfills in use. All are located in the New Territories:

Landfill	Location	Area (ha)	Opened	Capacity	Status
West New Territories Landfill (WENT)	Nim Wan, Tuen Mun	110	1993	61 million m³	Active (Full by 2018/2019)
South East New Territories Landfill (SENT)	Tseung Kwan O	100	1994	43	Active (Full by ?)
North East New Territories Landfill (NENT)	Ta Kwu Ling, North District	61	1995	35	Active (Full by 2016/2017)

==== Closed landfills ====
There are also 13 closed landfills. The closed landfills are converted into facilities such as golf courses, multi-purpose grass pitches, rest gardens, and ecological parks. Greenhouse gases emitted from closed landfills are used for energy. The closed landfills are:

Landfill	Location	Area (ha)	Opened	Capacity	Status	Rehab period	Current use
Gin Drinkers Bay	Kwai Chung, Kwai Tsing District	29	1960	3.5 million tonnes	Closed	1999–2000	now Kwai Chung Park
Ngau Tam Mei	Tam Mei, Yuen Long District	2	1973	0.15 million tonnes	Closed	1999–2000	Green Belt
Plover Cove	Tai Mei Tuk, Tai Po District	50	1973	15 million tonnes	Closed	1996–1997	golf driving range
Ma Tso Lung	Kwu Tong, North District	2	1976	0.2 million tonnes	Closed	1999–2000	recreation centre for Tung Wah Group of Hospitals
Ngau Chi Wan	Wong Tai Sin District	8	1976	0.7 million tonnes	Closed	1997–1998	Ngau Chi Wan Park
Sai Tso Wan	Kwun Tong District	9	1978	1.6 million tonnes	Closed	1997–1998	Sai Tso Wan Recreation Ground opened in 2004
Siu Lang Shui	Castle Peak	12	1978	1.2 million tonnes	Closed	1999–2000	Green Belt
Junk Bay Stage I	Tseung Kwan O, Sai Kung District	68	1978	15.2 million tonnes	Closed	1997–1999	proposed site for football academy and driving range
Ma Yau Tong West	Kwun Tong	6	1979	6 million tonnes	Closed	1997–1998	planned recreation facilities
Ma Yau Tong Central	Kwun Tong	11	1981	1.0 million tonnes	Closed	1997–1998	future Lam Tin Park
Pillar Point Valley	Tuen Mun District	38	1983	13 million tonnes	Closed	2004–2006	N/A
Jordan Valley	Kwun Tong	11	1986	1.5 million tonnes	Closed	1997–1998	Jordan Valley Park, Opened 2010.
Junk Bay Stage II-III	Tseung Kwan O, Sai Kung District	42	1988	12.6 million tonnes	Closed	1997–1999	temporary home for Hong Kong Air Cadet Corps model plane training facilities

==== Management of emissions from waste ====
The degradation of the organic components contained within waste generates both gaseous and liquid emissions. Landfill gas, principally methane and carbon dioxide, is formed once anaerobic conditions are achieved within the landfill, and leachate is formed as liquids percolate through landfilled waste and pick up a cocktail of toxic and contaminating elements from the multiple waste fractions that comprise Municipal Solid Waste. Both can be harmful to human health and toxic to the environment. Landfill gas is an important source of greenhouse gases that has been clearly shown to contribute to global warming, whilst leachate can be an important source of local contamination, especially to waterways. As Hong Kong is very close to the sea as well as to heavily built up areas, the control of emissions is of high importance. Wherever possible, landfill gas is used as a fuel for the generation of power and, in Hong Kong, landfill gas is used to generate electricity and to provide power for the treatment of leachate produced from the landfilled waste.

The technology used for landfill gas management is well known throughout the world and includes on-site power generation, provision of heat for leachate treatment and off-site use as a source of natural biogas for feeding into the gas main. Leachate is treated using landfill gas to provide heat for reducing the heavy loading of ammonia and ensuring that it can be released into the environment according to strict criteria as specified by the Environmental Protection Department of Hong Kong, and the process is employed at all three strategic landfill sites cited above.

== NGO campaigns ==
=== Friends of the Earth ===
Friends of the Earth (HK) is one of the local environmental groups in Hong Kong. One of its campaigns emphasises on setting up an all-inclusive recycling system.

=== Green Power ===
Green Power, another local environmental organisation, has many activities related to waste control and management. Green Power organises an ongoing "Zero Waste Action", aiming to reduce the waste the territory produces.

== See also ==
- Air pollution in Hong Kong
- Domestic waste management in Hong Kong
- Environment of Hong Kong
- Food waste recycling in Hong Kong
- Sha Tin Sewage Treatment Works
