= Ming Hung Wong =

Environmental scientist

Professor Ming Hung Wong
- 黃銘洪
- Education: Chinese University of Hong Kong; Durham University
- Scientific career
- Fields: Environmental science, Ecotoxicology, Phytoremediation
- Workplaces: Education University of Hong Kong
- Thesis: Soil fertility as a parameter in land evaluation of moorland, Waldridge Fell, County Durham (1973)
- Website: https://pappl.eduhk.hk/rich/web/person.xhtml?pid=167313

Ming Hung Wong (黃銘洪) is an environmental scientist from Hong Kong who has worked on ecotoxicology, environmental pollution, and food waste recycling. He is currently Advisor (Environmental Science) in the Department of Science and Environmental Studies at the Education University of Hong Kong, and was previously Editor-in-Chief of the journal Environmental Geochemistry and Health from 2002 to 2023.

== Education ==
Wong completed his PhD in Geography at Durham University in 1973.

== Career ==
Wong has a D index of 139 and over 69,000 citations.

From 2001 to 2003, Wong served as Regional Coordinator for Central and North-East Asia in the Regionally Based Assessment of Persistent Toxic project under the United Nations Environment Programme and Global Environment Facility. From 2009 to 2011, he was a consultant on UNEP/GEF's global review of emerging chemicals in developing countries.

Wong has worked in ecotoxicology and phytoremediation, with a focus on environmental pollution and sustainable remediation strategies. He developed a method to convert food waste into fish feed, supported by the Hong Kong Agriculture, Fisheries and Conservation Department. He also co-developed a portable aeroponic system for vertical farming, recognised at the 2024 Silicon Valley International Invention Festival and iCAN competition.

=== Honours ===
Wong was awarded two Doctor of Science (DSc) degrees by Durham University (1992) and the University of Strathclyde (2004) in recognition of his scholarship. In 2016, he received the Milton Gordon Award for Excellence in Phytoremediation from the International Phytotechnology Society.

He was elected a member of the European Academy of Sciences and Arts in 2022, conferred an honorary DSc by Southern Federal University (Russia) in 2024, and elected a Foreign Member of the Russian Academy of Sciences in 2025.

=== Conferences ===
Wong is the Founding Chair of three international conference series and currently serves as their Honorary Chair:

- CLEAR – Contaminated Land, Ecological Assessment & Remediation (since 2012)
- BWR – Biological Waste as Resource (since 2014)
- CHEER – Conference on Health, Environment, Education & Research (launched in 2024)

== Selected publications ==
=== Journal articles ===
- Wu SC, Cao ZH, Li ZG, Cheung KC, Wong MH (2005). Effects of biofertilizer containing N-fixer, P and K solubilizers, and AM fungi on maize growth: a greenhouse trial. Geoderma 125(1–2): 155–166.
- Wong MH (2003). Ecological restoration of mine-degraded soils, with emphasis on metal-contaminated soils. Chemosphere 50(6): 755–780.
- Liu JL, Wong MH (2013). Pharmaceuticals and personal care products (PPCPs): A review on environmental contamination in China. Environment International 59: 208–224.
- Huang YQ, Wong CKC, Zheng JS, Bouwman H, Barra R, Wahlstrom B, Wong MH (2012). Bisphenol A (BPA) in China: A review of sources, environmental levels, and potential human health impacts. Environment International 42: 92–99.

=== Edited volumes ===
Wong MH (ed.) (2013). Environmental Contamination: Health Risks and Ecological Restoration. CRC Press.

Wong MH, Purchase D, Dickinson N (eds.) (2023). Food Waste Valorisation: Food, Feed, Fertiliser, Fuel, and Value‑Added Products. World Scientific. ISBN 9781800612884.

Wong MH (ed.) (2025). Ecological and Human Health Impacts of Contaminated Food and Environments. CRC Press.
