= Kwai Chung Park =

Public park in Hong Kong

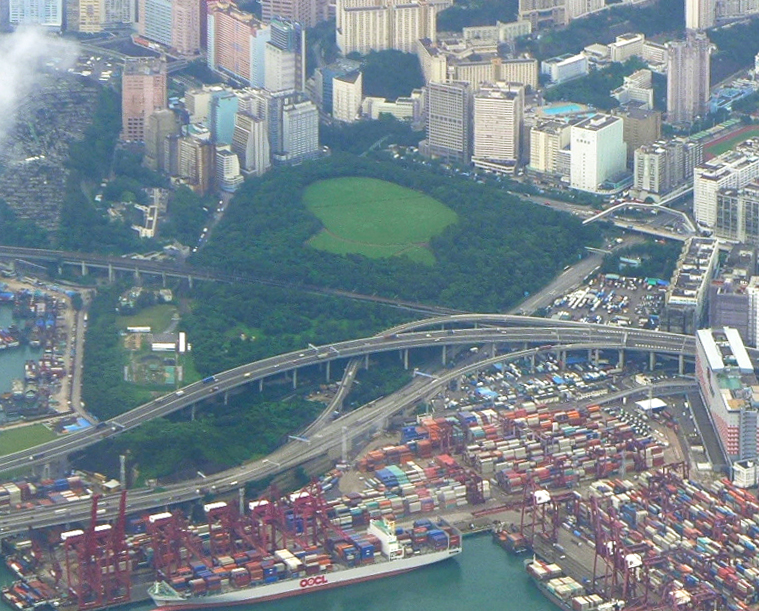
- Interactive map of Kwai Chung Park
- Type: Public park
- Location: Kwai Tsing District, New Territories, Hong Kong
- Coordinates: 22°21′19.7″N 114°07′11.5″E
- Area: 27 hectares
- Operated by: Leisure and Cultural Services Department
- Status: Open (Phase 1)
- Facilities: Former international small wheel park, temporary cricket ground

Kwai Chung Park
- Traditional Chinese: 葵涌公園
- Simplified Chinese: 葵涌公园
Transcriptions
Standard Mandarin
- Hanyu Pinyin: Kuí chōng gōng yuán
Yue: Cantonese
- Jyutping: Kwai4 chung1 gung1 jyun2

Kwai Chung Park (traditional Chinese: 葵涌公園; simplified Chinese: 葵涌公园; Jyutping: Kwai4 chung1 gung1 jyun2) is a public park currently open to the public in Hong Kong. It is located in the southern part of Kwai Chung, within the Kwai Tsing District of the New Territories, on the site of the former Gin Drinkers Bay landfill, which was decommissioned in 1979. The park is connected to the nearby Kwai Shing Estate by a pedestrian bridge. Plans to transform the landfill into a major town park date back to the 1980s under the British Hong Kong administration. However, just as the project neared completion, the discovery of methane on-site forced authorities to indefinitely postpone its opening. In 2009, a 3.9-hectare section of the site was repurposed as the Hong Kong Jockey Club International BMX Park, which saw only limited public use before being closed in 2010. This area is expected to form the first phase of the park when it reopens. The remainder of the landfill has largely been left abandoned, drawing widespread public concern and criticism. The site was cited twice in reports by the Audit Commission for mismanagement. It wasn’t until 2018 that part of the area was finally developed into a temporary cricket ground. If the entire landfill is eventually incorporated into the park, Kwai Chung Park would span approximately 27 hectares, making it the largest park in Hong Kong—larger than both the completed Tai Po Waterfront Park and the under-construction Metro Park in the Kai Tak Development Area of East Kowloon.

== History ==
=== Predecessors ===
Gin Drinkers Bay was originally a natural bay, but was later converted into a landfill following land reclamation. In 1963, as part of the government’s plan to develop Tsuen Wan into a satellite town, authorities proposed the construction of two urban incinerators to replace the landfill. Despite these plans, the landfill remained in use for more than a decade before it was officially decommissioned in 1979.

Following the landfill’s closure, the government announced plans in 1981 to redevelop the site into a public park. Lawmakers at the time expressed hopes that the new park would rival Victoria Park on Hong Kong Island and Kowloon Park in Tsim Sha Tsui. The project was put out to tender the following year.Originally slated for completion and opening in 1992, the park’s launch was halted after it was discovered that decomposing landfill waste was emitting methane gas. As a result, the opening had to be cancelled. In 1993, the Environmental Protection Department allocated HK$110 million for methane mitigation and long-term monitoring works at the site.The park was not officially handed over to the Leisure and Cultural Services Department (LCSD) until the year 2000.

=== Planning pause ===
In 2003, the Home Affairs Bureau reported that the park’s basic facilities had fallen into disrepair and required renovation. The accessible pathway for people with disabilities also needed to be rebuilt. However, at the time, the outbreak of Severe Acute Respiratory Syndrome (SARS) had placed significant strain on public resources. The Leisure and Cultural Services Department (LCSD) was forced to reassess the timelines of various development projects, prioritizing cultural and recreational facilities accordingly. As a result, the Kwai Chung Park project was not given priority. Since then, the LCSD has explored several development proposals, including transforming the site into a football training center, opening the section of the park facing Tsuen Wan Road, and constructing facilities such as a community garden and rest area, a model car racing track, a multi-purpose lawn, and other recreational spaces. However, some of these proposals exceeded the budget cap for minor works administered by the Architectural Services Department (ArchSD), while others were considered too modest to meet the needs of a large-scale park like Kwai Chung Park. Consequently, none of the proposed plans were implemented.

To support the BMX events of the 2009 East Asian Games, the government allocated a 3.9-hectare plot of land southwest of Kwai Chung Park to the Cycling Association of Hong Kong, China, for the construction of a BMX cycling track. As the rehabilitated Gin Drinkers Bay landfill was under the jurisdiction of the Environmental Protection Department (EPD), the department was responsible for drafting the land lease. On 3 July 2008, the EPD signed a 21-year lease agreement with the Cycling Association. In 2009, the Hong Kong Jockey Club donated HK$22 million to fund the construction of the facility, which became Hong Kong’s first and only BMX training and competition venue built to international standards. The Hong Kong Jockey Club International BMX Park officially opened on 31 October 2009 and served as a competition venue during that year’s East Asian Games.

In April 2013, the Audit Commission released a report criticizing the Leisure and Cultural Services Department (LCSD) for its inadequate development and management of parks and gardens. The report specifically called on the LCSD to investigate why Kwai Chung Park—despite being handed over to the department in 2000—had yet to be developed, and urged the department to take concrete steps to expedite the project’s completion. In response, the LCSD stated that district councillors had made several proposals regarding the park’s future development. The department pledged to work with relevant offices under the Home Affairs Department to evaluate and formulate various development plans. These plans would subsequently be submitted to the district councils for consultation, with the goal of identifying suitable funding sources to support the park’s construction.

=== Preliminary research ===
In December 2013, the Leisure and Cultural Services Department (LCSD) completed a preliminary study on the future development of Kwai Chung Park. The department proposed transforming the remaining 23 hectares of undeveloped land into a multi-purpose recreational complex, including a natural grass pitch, a football field, and a golf driving range with 30 driving lanes, equipped with suspended and fenced safety nets. The proposal aimed to serve the recreational needs of the local community, particularly the large population of ethnic minorities in Kwai Tsing District who are enthusiastic about cricket. Additional proposed amenities included jogging tracks, Tai Chi areas, fitness zones, community gardens, and car parks. The LCSD also stated that it would begin preparatory work based on this proposal, including commissioning the Architectural Services Department in 2013 to conduct a technical feasibility study to assess whether such facilities could be safely constructed on the rehabilitated landfill site.

The department indicated that once a more concrete development plan had been formulated, it would conduct further consultations with the Kwai Tsing District Council and local residents. However, in February 2014, the government clarified that since the technical feasibility study had not yet been carried out, it was not in a position to provide a definitive development timeline or detailed project proposal at that stage.

To accelerate the interim use of Kwai Chung Park, the government allocated an additional 4.5 hectares of land in the northern section of the park to the Hong Kong Cricket Association in 2015 for the establishment of a temporary cricket ground. In addition to using the site for team training, the association committed to reserving at least 12 hours per week for public bookings. During other opening hours, members of the public would also be allowed to watch matches and training sessions from designated spectator areas. Construction was scheduled for completion in the third quarter of 2018. During the District Council elections held that same year, Democratic Party councillor Lam Lap-chi included in his campaign platform a proposal to transform Kwai Chung Park into a central town park. His vision included restoring the park’s original facilities and developing a historical heritage trail highlighting the significance of the Gin Drinkers Line during the Japanese occupation, with the aim of promoting public awareness of Hong Kong’s wartime history. However, Lam was ultimately unsuccessful in his re-election bid.

On 10 November 2016, the Environmental Protection Department (EPD) submitted methane monitoring data for Kwai Chung Park to the Kwai Tsing District Council. According to the report, the maximum recorded methane concentration since 2001 had consistently remained between 0 and 30 parts per million (ppm), which falls within established safety thresholds. In a written response, the EPD stated that the United States Environmental Protection Agency recommends a maximum methane concentration of 500 ppm, a level that Kwai Chung Park has never exceeded. The department also noted that the World Health Organization has not established specific safety standards for methane levels in restored landfill sites.

In May 2018, the Audit Commission once again published a report criticizing the Leisure and Cultural Services Department (LCSD) for its unsatisfactory progress in developing Kwai Chung Park. The report noted that although the LCSD had proposed constructing a golf driving range in 2013, the plan was submitted to the District Council for consultation before any technical feasibility assessment had been conducted. After the proposal received approval, it was later found to be unworkable. The Commission questioned why a viable development plan had not been formulated prior to seeking public consultation.

The report also highlighted that the restoration and development of Kwai Chung Park had been included in the “Five-Year Plan for Sports and Recreational Facilities” announced in the January 2017 Policy Address, with the objective of commencing the project by 2022 or earlier. However, as of February 2018, the Home Affairs Bureau had yet to revise the May 2014 Works Definition Statement, a necessary step before the Architectural Services Department could prepare a technical feasibility study. As a result, approximately 85% of the park’s land remained inaccessible to the public. In September 2018, a temporary cricket pitch within the park began trial operations and was officially opened to the public on 27 November, accompanied by an opening ceremony held on the same day.

=== Submit your design ===
In March 2020, the Architectural Services Department awarded the design contract for Kwai Chung Park. Subsequently, in July of the same year, the Leisure and Cultural Services Department (LCSD) submitted outline design drawings for the park’s first phase to the Kwai Tsing District Council, detailing the proposed facilities to be constructed. During the consultation, some district councillors expressed reservations about the rigid zoning of the park into separate areas for fitness, children’s play, and pets. They proposed that the space be temporarily designated as open lawn, allowing time for community consultation on residents’ actual preferences for recreational facilities. However, both the Architectural Services Department and the LCSD maintained that clearly defining the zones at this stage was necessary to avoid potential project delays. The department also presented two options for incorporating pet-friendly areas into the park: one involved opening the entire Kwai Chung Park—excluding the cricket pitch and the BMX facility—to visitors with pets; the other proposed setting aside a section of the park as a “pet-sharing park” that would coexist with a traditional pet park. Additionally, some councillors suggested expanding the area of open lawn, converting the planned fitness and children’s play zones into a larger green space, and integrating it with the pet area to form a unified “recreational activity zone.”

== Facilities ==
=== Enabled ===
The Hong Kong Jockey Club International BMX Park occupies approximately 3.9 hectares and features a 350-metre international-standard BMX track, a 60-metre training track, and other basic supporting facilities. Usage of the park is subject to a fee.

The temporary cricket pitch in Kwai Chung Park spans approximately 4.48 hectares and includes two standard cricket grounds as well as a practice and competition field designed for youth and children. Its operating hours are from 1:00 pm to 5:30 pm, Monday through Thursday, and from 8:00 am to 5:00 pm on Saturdays and Sundays. Public access hours are from 7:00 am to 9:00 am, Monday to Friday, during which residents may use the field for walking and morning exercise.

The Leisure and Cultural Services Department (LCSD) had announced that the pitch would be accessible to the public upon completion. However, in the early stages of its operation, licensing issues restricted public access to walking on the grounds—visitors were only allowed to watch matches from designated viewing areas. It was not until a licence renewal in 2019 that full public access for weekday morning walks was officially permitted, starting in May of that year.

=== Planning and construction ===
According to the development outline submitted by the Leisure and Cultural Services Department to the Kwai Tsing District Council in 2020, the first phase of Kwai Chung Park will be located adjacent to the Hong Kong Jockey Club International BMX Park. Planned facilities include landscaped gardens, children’s playgrounds, fitness zones, jogging tracks, high-quality walking trails, a pet park, a performance stage, and other recreational amenities. This area, along with the temporary cricket field, is bounded by the elevated tracks of the MTR Tung Chung Line and the Airport Express.

In December 2022, construction began on the lower section (Phase 1) of Kwai Chung Park. The phase is scheduled for development throughout 2024 and is expected to be completed and opened to the public in the third or fourth quarter of 2025. Construction of the upper section (Phase 2, excluding the existing cricket pitch) is set to begin in November 2024, with development continuing through 2025 and full completion anticipated between 2026 and 2027.

== Current situation and criticism ==
=== Park wasteland ===
Since the park was handed over to the Leisure and Cultural Services Department (LCSD) in 2000, poor maintenance by the authorities has left many of its basic facilities—such as footpaths, street lighting, toilets, and administrative offices—in a state of disrepair, with some areas resembling ruins. A notice reading “No entry without permission” was posted outside the gate. The park’s condition has drawn criticism from the Audit Commission on two separate occasions.

In 2016, the pro-democracy group Street Workers hung a banner reading “Kwai Chung Park lies idle—repair it immediately for public use” at the closed entrance to the park, calling on the government to restore the park and open it to the public as soon as possible. Democratic Party district councillors Ng Kim-sing, Lam Siu-fai, Hui Kei-cheung, and Wong Ping-kuen had previously urged the government during district council meetings to expedite the opening of the park. Ng cited a 2013 Audit Commission report, which criticised the LCSD for having the authority to develop a major park but allowing the site to remain largely unused for more than two decades since construction began in 1989—a situation he deemed unacceptable.

In 2020, Legislative Councillor for the Architectural, Surveying, Planning and Landscape functional constituency, Tse Wai-chuen, also criticised the long-standing delays in the park’s development. He argued that the Home Affairs Bureau and the LCSD should bear primary responsibility, and called for intervention by senior government officials.

=== Temporary cricket pitch ===
In the early days of the temporary cricket ground’s operation, the general public was only permitted to watch matches within the grounds, but was not allowed to walk or move freely around the area. Wong Yun-tat, District Councillor for Kwai Chung Estate South in the Kwai Tsing District, voiced his disapproval, stating that it was unacceptable for residents to only be granted access under the pretext of “spectating.” He criticised the ground for operating more like a private club and called on the government to revise the licensing terms to allow residents to walk, jog, and sit on the grass within the facility. Wong also urged the government to clearly define the terms of the venue license and address third-party insurance coverage during contract renewal to ensure public safety for all users of the site.

However, even after the temporary cricket pitch was opened to the public, it saw consistently low usage. Chow Wai-hung, District Councillor for Kwai Shing East Estate, expressed dissatisfaction that the pitch was only open for two hours on weekdays. He called for extended opening hours and urged the government to carry out renovation works once the current lease expires, with a view to opening the facility more fully to the public. Chow also noted that prior to the site being leased to the Hong Kong Cricket Association, some residents would climb onto the grassy area to exercise. After it was fenced off, they stopped using it—an indication, in his view, that there was clear public demand for open grassy space. He criticised the lack of publicity surrounding the pitch’s availability and called for improved promotion efforts to encourage greater community use.

In addition, some legislators noted that the temporary cricket pitch occupies land designated for the second phase of the park’s development. They argued that the government should not renew the lease beyond 2022 and should instead return the site to the residents of Kwai Tsing.
