= Yan Tin Estate =

Public housing estate in Tuen Mun, Hong Kong

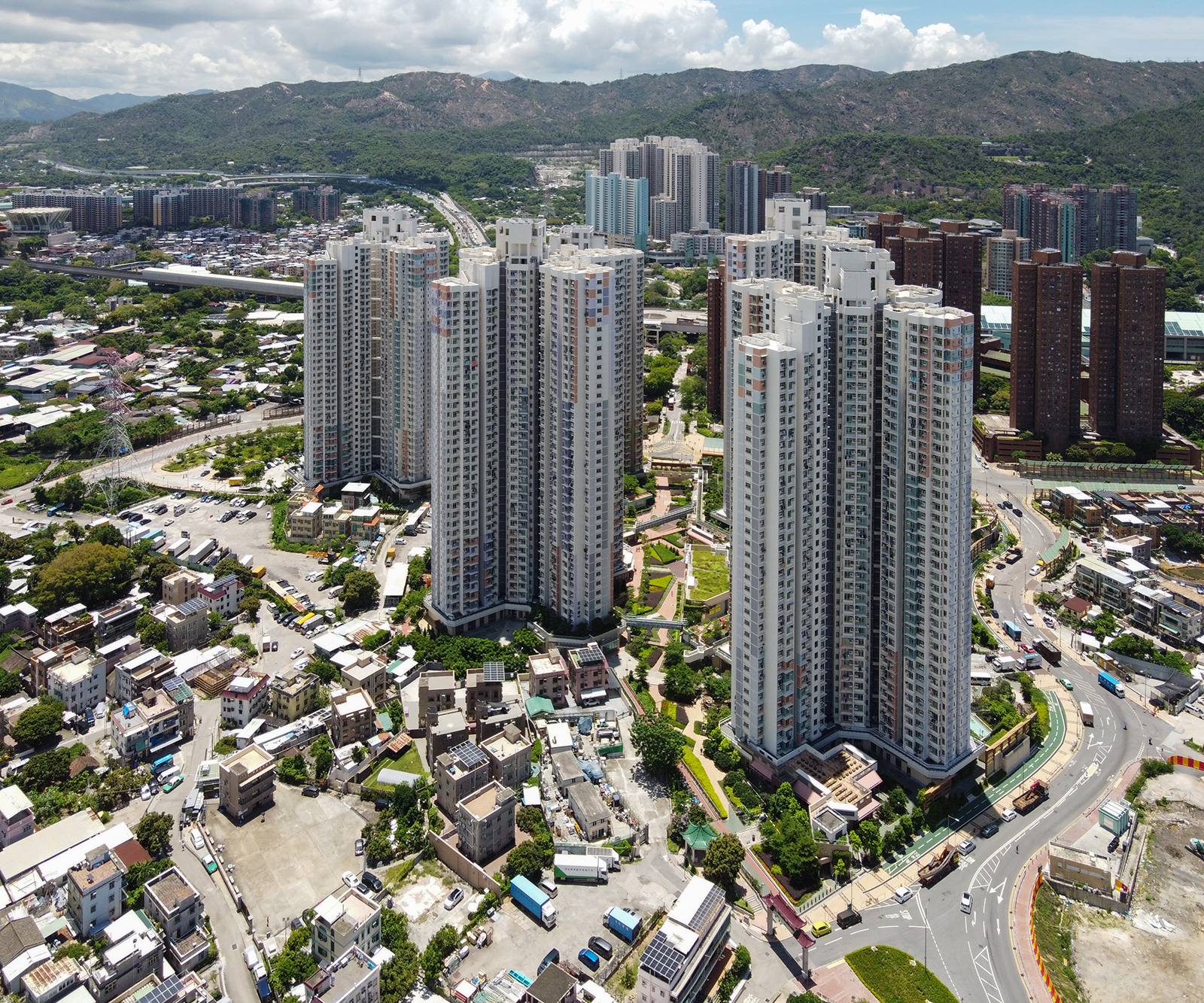
- Yan Tin Estate
- Interactive map of Yan Tin Estate

General information
- Location: 39 Tsing Lun Road, Tuen Mun; New Territories, Hong Kong
- Coordinates: 22.41461°N 113.9765°E
- Status: Completed
- Category: Public rental housing
- No. of blocks: 5
- No. of units: 4,688

Construction
- Constructed: 2018; 8 years ago
- Authority: Hong Kong Housing Authority

Yan Tin Estate (Chinese: 欣田邨) is a public housing estate in Tuen Mun, New Territories, Hong Kong located behind Siu Hong Court. It consists of five residential blocks, ranging in height from 33 to 38 storeys, and the Yan Tin Shopping Centre. It provides 4,688 rental flats catering to an approximate population of around 13,000. Tenant intake on 2018.

== Houses ==
Name	Chinese name	Building type	Completed
Chun Tin House	俊田樓	Non-standard (Cross-shaped)	2018
Yat Tin House	逸田樓	Non-standard (Y-shaped)	2018
Hei Tin House	喜田樓	Non-standard (Cross-shaped)	2018
Yuet Tin House	悅田樓	Non-standard (Cross-shaped)	2018
Luk Tin House	綠田樓	Non-standard (Cross-shaped)	2018

== Politics ==
Yan Tin Estate is located in Yan Tin constituency of the Tuen Mun District Council. It is currently represented by Apple Lai Ka-man, who was elected in the 2019 elections.

== See also ==
- Public housing estates in Tuen Mun
- Tsz Tin Tsuen
