= Lam Tei Interchange =

Road interchange in Hong Kong

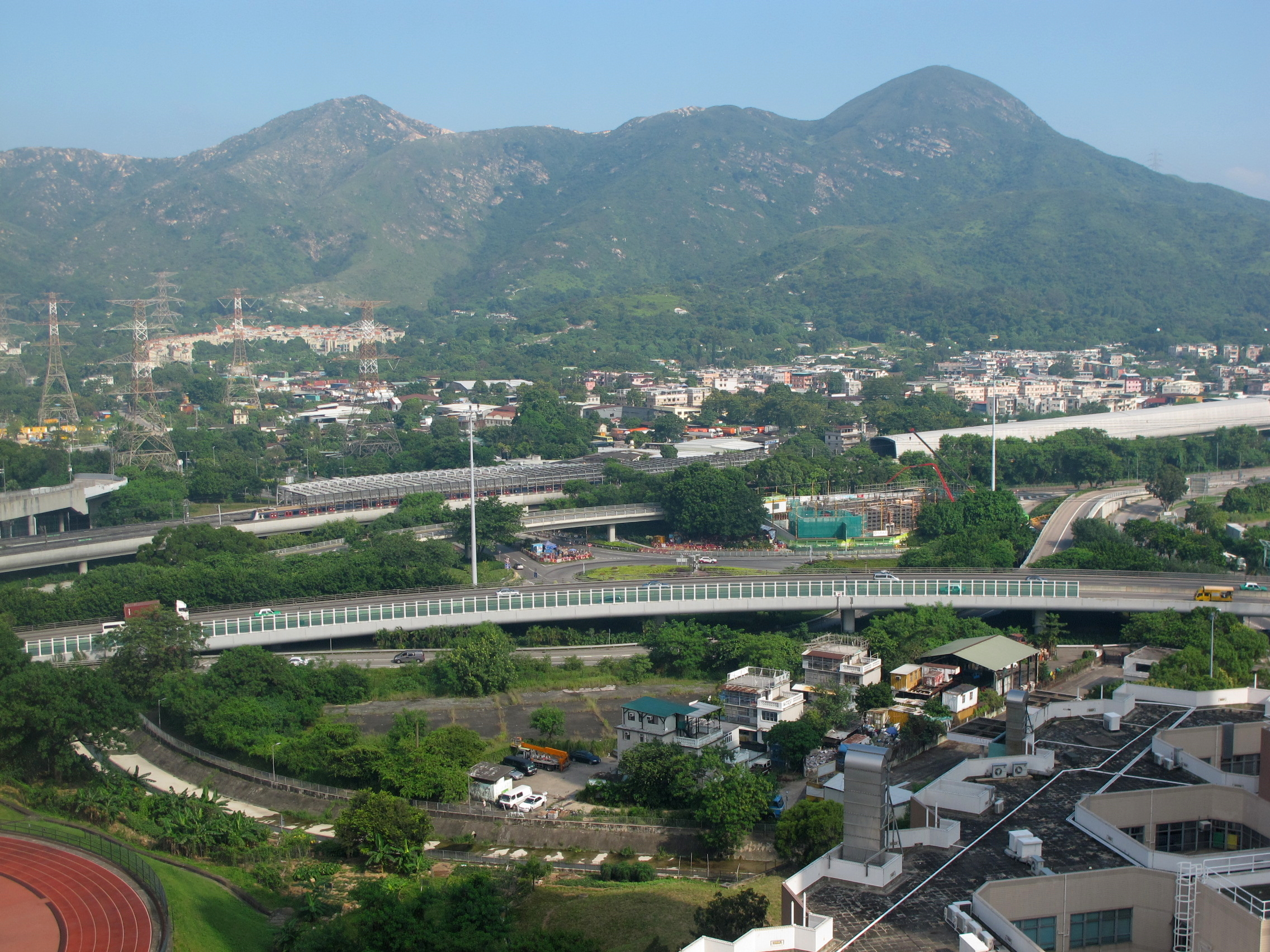
Lam Tei Interchange in September 2013

Lam Tei Interchange (Chinese: 藍地交匯處) is a major traffic interchange in Lam Tei, Tuen Mun District, New Territories, Hong Kong. It connects Castle Peak Road, Yuen Long Highway and Tsing Lun Road.

== See also ==
- List of streets and roads in Hong Kong
