= Po Tong Ha =

Village in Tuen Mun District, Hong Kong

Coordinates: 22.416172°N 113.970998°E

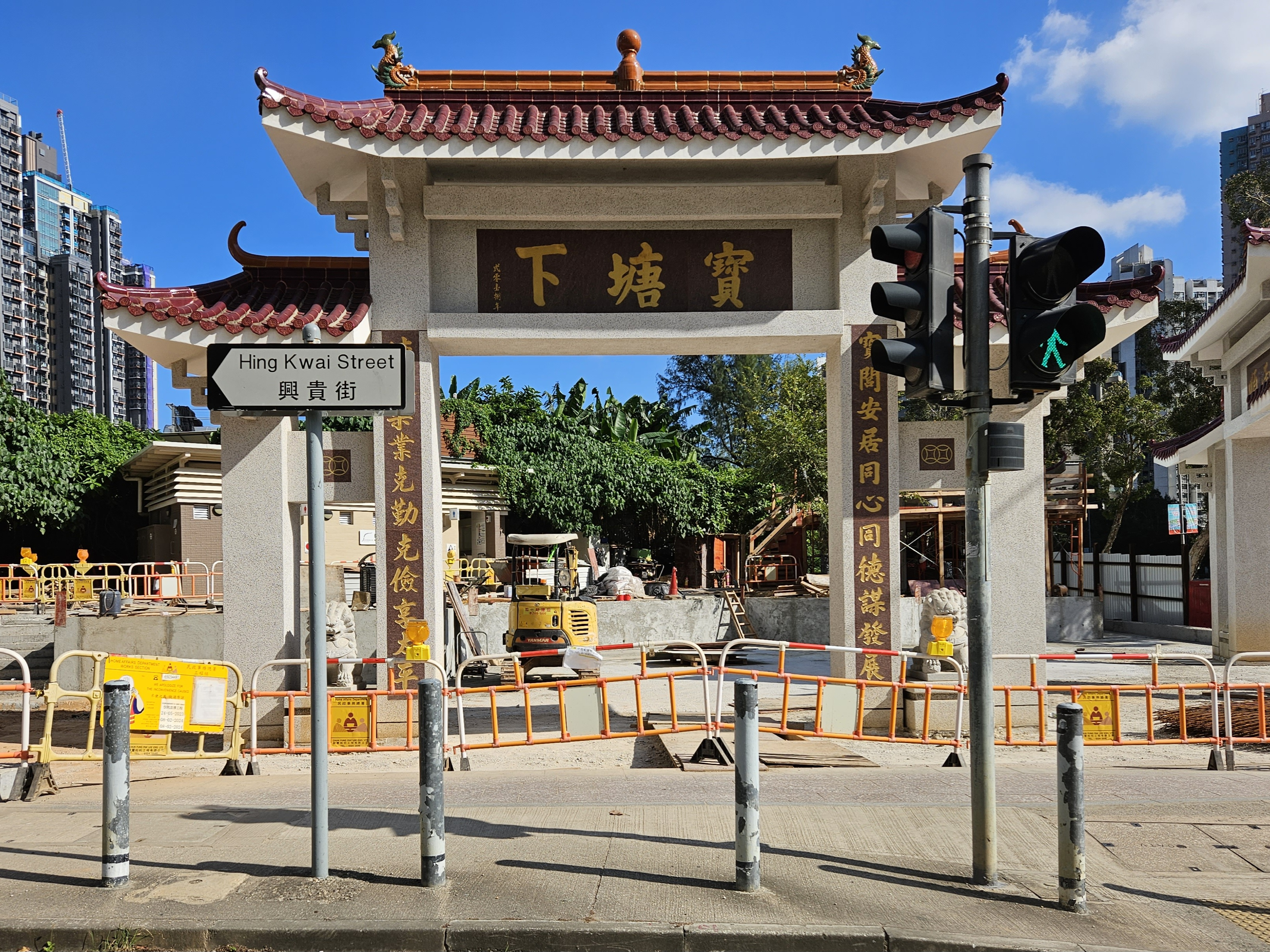
Paifang of Po Tong Ha.

Po Tong Ha (Chinese: 寶塘下) is a village in Tuen Mun District, Hong Kong.

== Administration ==
Po Tong Ha is a recognized village under the New Territories Small House Policy. It is one of the 36 villages represented within the Tuen Mun Rural Committee. For electoral purposes, Po Tong Ha is part of the Po Tin constituency.

== See also ==
- Po Tin (constituency)
- Siu Hang Tsuen (Tuen Mun District), a village located directly south of Po Tong Ha
- Tuen Mun Rural Committee
