= Nim Wan =

Area of Hong Kong

Coordinates: 22.421224°N 113.93358°E

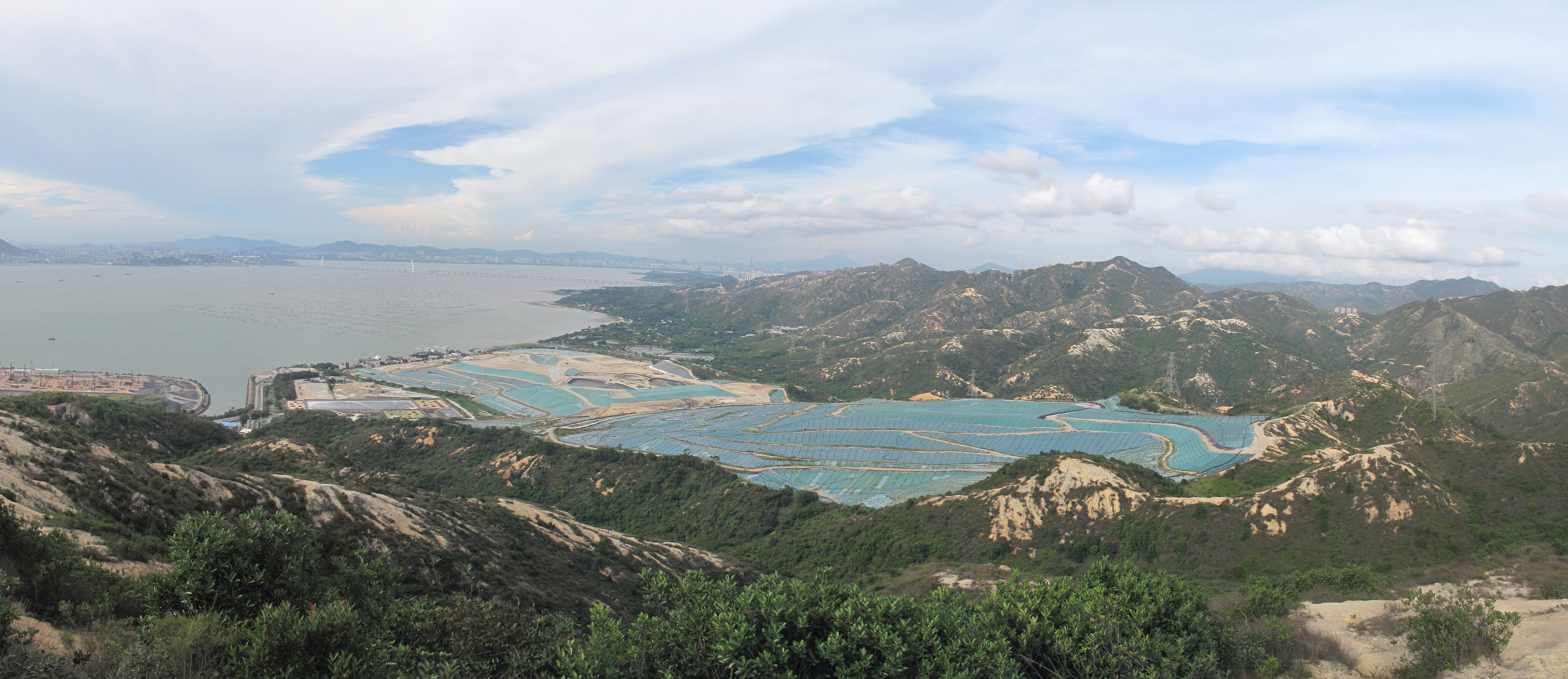
West New Territories Landfill facing Deep Bay.

Nim Wan (Chinese: 稔灣) was a bay between Tsang Tsui (Chinese: 曾咀) and Ha Pak Nai (Chinese: 下白坭) in Tuen Mun District, New Territories, Hong Kong. It approaches Deep Bay with Shekou, Shenzhen at its opposite.

The bay was reclaimed to become a landfill site, "West New Territories Landfill" (Chinese: 新界西堆填區). The landfill site covers the area of 110 hectares. It can handle more than 6,500 tonnes of waste per day and is expected to be used for 25 years.

Nim Wan is a recognized village under the New Territories Small House Policy.

== Education ==
Nim Wan is in Primary One Admission (POA) School Net 72. Within the school net are multiple aided schools (operated independently but funded with government money) and one government school: Tin Shui Wai Government Primary School (天水圍官立小學).

== See also ==
- Waste management in Hong Kong
- Tuen Mun Rural Committee
