= Tuen Mun Rural Committee =

Rural committee in Hong Kong

- 屯門鄉事委員會
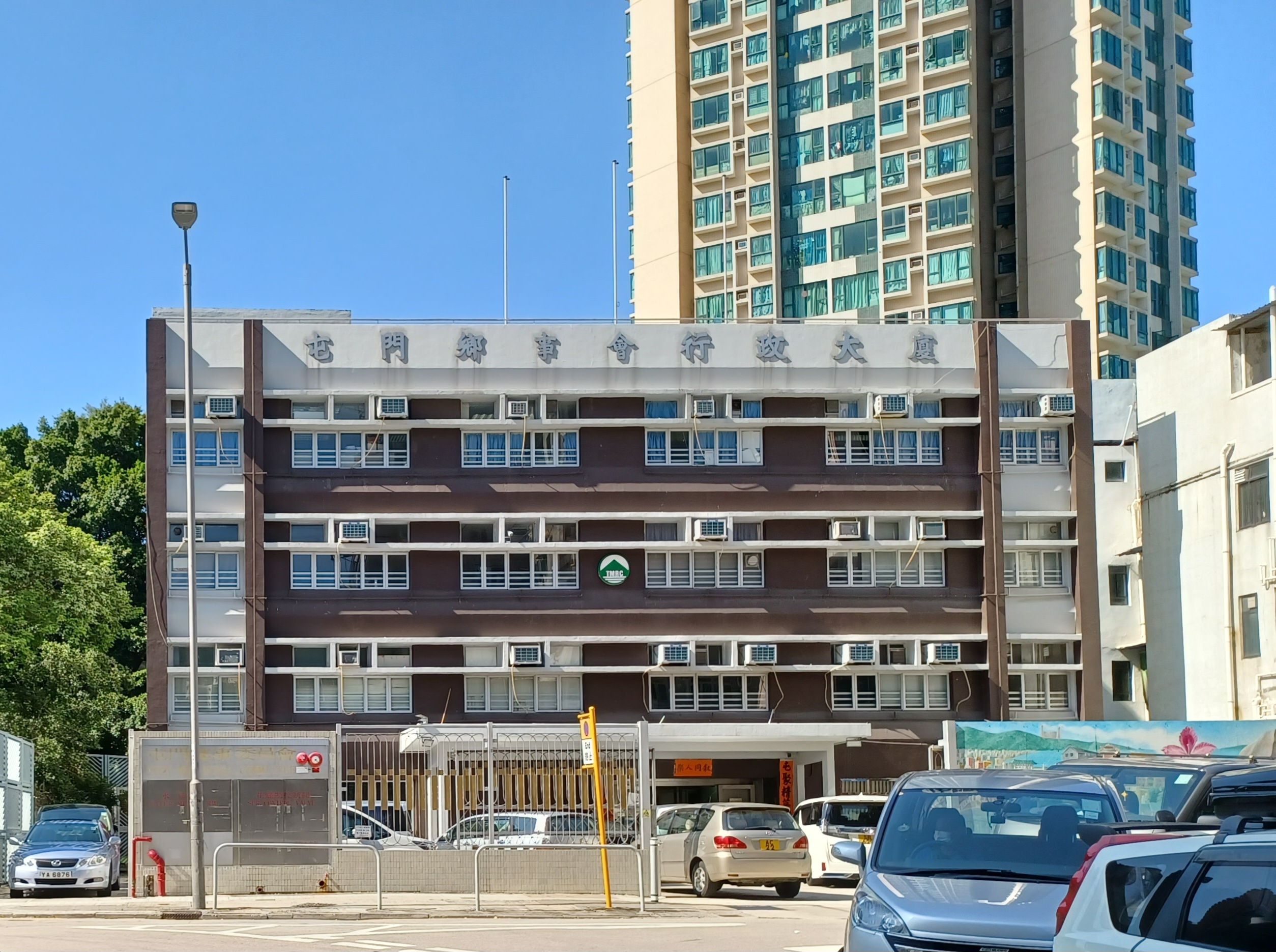
- Tuen Mun Rural Committee Administration Office

Agency overview
- Formed: 1953
- Headquarters: Tuen Mun Rural Committee Administration Office, 1 Tsing Yin Street, Tuen Mun
- Agency executive: Kenneth Lau, Chairman
- Website: www.hktmrc.com

The Tuen Mun Rural Committee (Chinese: 屯門鄉事委員會, TMRC) is a rural committee in Hong Kong. It was founded by rural leader Chan Yat-sen in 1953 with representatives from 29 villages in Tuen Mun. Today the rural committee consists of 36 villages and 69 village representatives.

== History ==
It was founded on the basis of Tuen Mun Village Kaifong Office which was created by Chan Yat-sen for the betterment of the village affairs and development which also administered Tuen Mun Market. In 1953, it was transformed into a rural committee with representatives from 29 villages, in which Chan became the chairman for six terms. Lau Wong-fat succeeded as chairman in 1970 and served from seventh to twentieth terms until Junius Ho Kwan-yiu took over in 2011. In 2015, Lau Wong-fat retook the chairmanship from Junius Ho.

In 1959, the New Territories villagers protested against the changing of land use by the government which later brought the New Territories Heung Yee Kuk Ordinance into existence. The rural committee has been member of the Heung Yee Kuk, the powerful organ voicing the interests of the villagers and its chairman Lau Wong-fat has been Chairman of the Kuk for more than twenty years. The chairman of the rural committee is also the ex officio member of the Tuen Mun District Council.

== List of chairmen ==
1. Chan Yat-sen, 1953–1970
2. Lau Wong-fat, 1970–2011
3. Junius Ho Kwan-yiu, 2011–2015
4. Lau Wong-fat, 2015–2016
5. Kenneth Lau, 2016–present

== List of villages ==
- Chung Uk Tsuen (鍾屋村)
- Fu Tei Tsuen (虎地村)
- Fuk Hang Tsuen (Lower) (福亨村(下))
- Fuk Hang Tsuen (Upper) (福亨村(上))
- Ho Tin Tsuen (河田村)
- Kei Lun Wai (麒麟圍)
- Kwong Shan Tsuen (礦山村)
- Lam Tei (藍地)
- Leung Tin Tsuen (良田村)
- Luen On San Tsuen (聯安新村)
- Lung Kwu Tan (龍鼓灘)
- Nai Wai (泥圍)
- Nim Wan (稔灣)
- Po Tong Ha (寶塘下)
- San Hing Tsuen (新慶村)
- San Wai Tsai (新圍仔)
- Siu Hang Tsuen (小坑村)
- Siu Lam (小欖)
- So Kwun Wat (掃管笏)
- Sun Fung Wai (順風圍)
- Tai Lam Chung (大欖涌)
- Tin Fu Tsai (田夫仔)
- To Yuen Wai (桃園圍)
- Tseng Tau Tsuen (Middle and Lower) (井頭村(中及下))
- Tseng Tau Tsuen (Upper) (井頭村(上))
- Tsing Chuen Wai (青磚圍)
- Tsing Shan Tsuen (青山村)
- Tsz Tin Tsuen (紫田村)
- Tuen Mun Kau Hui (屯門舊墟)
- Tuen Mun San Hui (屯門新墟)
- Tuen Mun San Tsuen (屯門新村)
- Tuen Tsz Wai (屯子圍)
- Wo Ping San Tsuen (和平新村)
- Yeung Siu Hang (楊小坑)
- Yick Yuen Tsuen (亦園村)

== See also ==
- Indigenous inhabitants (Hong Kong)
