= Kwong Shan Tsuen =

Coordinates: 22.412181°N 113.965857°E

Kwong Shan Tsuen (Chinese: 礦山村) is a village in Tuen Mun District, Hong Kong.

== Administration ==
Kwong Shan Tsuen is one of the 36 villages represented within the Tuen Mun Rural Committee.
