= Domestic waste management in Hong Kong =

In Hong Kong, domestic waste has always been the largest portion of municipal solid waste. In 2014, domestic waste constitutes 65% of municipal solid waste, and 43% of total solid waste at landfills (Environmental Protection Department [EPD], 2015b). Hong Kong has the highest daily domestic waste generation rates per capita compared to other metropolitans in Asia: Metro Tokyo creates 0.77 kg per day per capita, Seoul generates 0.95 kg, Taipei City produces 1.00 kg and Hong Kong tops the rank by 1.36 kg (Environment Bureau, 2013).

== Statistics ==
Disposal of total solid waste at landfills in 2014
Waste category	Average daily quantity (tpd)
Municipal solid waste	9,782 (2.57%)
(i) Domestic waste	6,418 (0.9%)
(ii) Commercial waste	2,565 (6.6%)
(iii) Industrial waste	799 (2.4%)
Overall construction waste	3,942 (9.8%)
Special waste	1,135 (-3.2%)
All waste received at landfills (a+b+c)	14,859 (3.8%)

Table 1 (Source: Environmental Protection Department [EPD], 2015b)

== Current recycling policy implemented by HKSAR government ==
In order to boost the recycling industries in Hong Kong, HKSAR assists the recycling industries with solving their constraints by setting up the Eco Park at Tuen Mun. With a site area of 200,000m2, Eco Park has been developed in two phases and provides a rentable area of 140,000m2 long-term land at affordable costs for the recycling industry. The development of the Eco Park is one of the government’s initiatives to provide long-term land at affordable rent for the development of the recycling industry in Hong Kong to encourage investment in advanced technology and value-added recycling processes(Environmental Protection Department [EPD], 2015b). At its current stage, 13 recycling companies have rented space at Eco Park for the recycling of waste cooking oil, waste metals, waste wood, waste electrical and electronic equipment (WEEE), waste plastics, waste batteries, construction and demolition waste, waste glass, waste rubber tyres, food waste and waste PCB.

However, according to the statistics provided by the Audit Commission (2010), one of the greatest problem for Eco Park is the lack in regular resources in terms of technological and financial supports. In addition to the low market value of some of the recycling materials including plastics and glass, it results in the low usage of Eco Park, with some recycling companies even stopping tenancy at Eco Park in the upcoming stage of development.

== Suggested waste management schemes in Hong Kong ==
=== Extension of landfill sites ===
In 2014, the Legislative Council approved $2.1 billion and HK$7.5 billion for the extension of the Tseung Kwan O and Ta Kwu Ling landfill respectively. Other funding would be approved for studying the feasibility of expanding the Tuen Mun landfill (Cheung, 2014).

The landfill services are expected to last till mid-2020s after expansion (EDP, 2015a), but concerns are raised as to its worsening of methane emission and unpleasant smell, leading to neighboring residents’ discontent.

=== Construction of Integrated Waste Management Facilities (IWMF) ===
The Integrated Waste Management Facilities incorporate advanced incineration as its core along with recycling plants for recovering recyclable wastes from MSW. Apart from alleviating the landfill load, hundreds of tons of useful materials such as metals will be recovered each day. The IWMF can also recover energy from the waste and convert the energy into electricity supplying more than 100,000 households, in turn reducing carbon dioxide emission by 440,000 tons each year (EDP, 2011). Yet, local concerns are still growing with respect to whether pollutant gases and dust particles harmful to health and environment will be emitted, and the price of incinerators run high, costing $14.9 billion for construction and $353 million a year for operations (Cheung, 2012).

=== Implement Municipal Solid Waste Charge (MSW) ===
Hong Kong is currently actively discussing the options of solid waste charging, and the quantitative-based charging system adopted by Taipei is deemed as an apt reference for Hong Kong supported by legislators. Following the “polluters-pay” principle, the public must purchase designated garbage bags, ranging from 5-litre to 120-litre bags at different price levels, from EDP fitting to their own needs. Recyclables can be separated to minimize the load put into the charged garbage bags as a measure to encourage recycling. The waste charge scheme has reduced 60% of domestic waste volume in Taipei (Green Power, 2012).

The scheme is generally supported, though price levels of the charge and other details remain controversial. Over 50% of interviewed Hong Kong citizens showed positive preferences for the domestic waste charge scheme with less than 20% disagreeing, according to a survey conducted by the Hong Kong Institute of Asia-Pacific Studies of the Chinese University of Hong Kong (2013).

=== Comparison among those alternatives ===
	Sustainability	Monetary cost of implementation	Political Feasibility
Alternatives 1: Expansion of Landfills	Low sustainability due to limited land resources; cannot offer long-term benefits	HK$9.6 billion for the extension of the two landfills, and at least $1.5 billion per year for operation and maintenance.	Negative environmental side effects such as emission of methane and unpleasant smell and social side effects such as creation of discontents from neighbouring residents.
Alternative 2: Construction of IWMF	High sustainability including “waste-to-energy” idea from incinerators.	HK$14.9 billion for initial capital and operating costs of the incineration plants, and $353 million for operation a year	Operation of incinerators creates further environmental pollution such as ash and pollutants
Alternative 3: Municipal Solid Waste Charge Scheme	High sustainability as it nurtures an active recycling society and provides incentive to reduce waste	Unknown costs for domestic waste charging scheme implementation	Opposition from citizens who think the scheme aggravates their financial burden, but should not be a serious problem

== MSW Charging Public Consultation ==
The Municipal Solid Waste Charging was a widely considered solution to tackle Hong Kong’s urging waste management problem. Under the Polluter-Pays Principle, it aims to alleviate pressure on domestic waste discharge in the two-sided market, where citizens are discouraged to generate domestic waste as they would be charged based on the amount they discharge while the charges collected would be injected for waste handling and reduction schemes, such as creating infrastructure in landfills and subsidizing recycling industries. There were a total of 3 phases in the public consultation process starting from February 2012.

=== Stage one ===
The first phase was a Public Consultation period that began in 2012, spanning three months. The public was encouraged to provide their views before the consultation period ended in April. A consultation document titled “Is Waste Charging an Option Public Consultation” was released by EPD in January 2012 (EPD, 2012). It provided an overview of Hong Kong’s waste management, outlined the international experience in launching MSW Charge Schemes and explained the key issues such as operational matters and broad approaches of MSW Charging in seeking to introduce such as system in Hong Kong. The document was publicly accessible on the EPD website, the EPD office and District offices, while the public could forward their views by email, post or facsimile within the consultation period.

The consultation findings showed there was majority support within the community for introducing quantity-based MSW charging as a policy tool to facilitate waste recovery and reduction, yet the implementation details such as concerns about environmental hygiene issues and fly-tipping had diverse views. In light of the findings, the government decided that a quantity-based MSW charging system should be the broad direction in pursuing domestic waste reduction.

=== Stage 2 ===
The second phase was the Public Engagement Process implemented by the Council for Sustainable Development, spanning for four months starting in September 2013. The document entitling “Waste Reduction by Waste Charging – How to Implement?” was published to obtain views on how best MSW Charging would be launched in Hong Kong, where four key issues – charging mechanism, charging level, coverage of charging scheme and recycling were covered (SDC, 2013).

=== Stage 3 ===
The third phase was the Pilot Scheme on MSW Charging implemented by EPD in April 2014. It aimed to collect further public views towards MSW Charging and accumulate practical experience for MSW Charging launch in future. The Scheme lasted for six months during which waste disposal statistics of 7 participating estates would be collected for analysis.

The entire consultation, as a policy process for administration, contained both pros and cons.

=== Pros ===
For pros, firstly, the several stages of public consultation had a rather balanced inclusion as it was publicly accessible. The series helped to reorient public towards self-organization and create overall dynamics towards Hong Kong’s waste management. The time span of the whole consultation series was appropriate, lasting for 2 years. Without being too lengthy or too short, appropriate responses from the public and stakeholders could be obtained to address the pressing domestic waste problem in Hong Kong. Moreover, the consultation did actually obtain public opinions where their stances were made clear, such that the government could set a broad direction to implement the quantity-based MSW Charging as a domestic waste management policy. It acted as a basis of community support for the scheme.

=== Cons ===
However, the consultation contained flaws that the government needed to be alert. First, the public might not be sufficiently informed. Although posters, a video and consultation documents were published, the promotion of the consultation, provision of information such as the waste problem, alternatives, opportunities and potential solutions were inadequate. Also, important issues such as charging method, fee amount and legislation process scheme were not mentioned. Thus more discussion was needed for successful implementation. Also, the public consultation was “one-way” – it was mostly the government collecting public views. Applying two-way communication using top-down approaches might be more appropriate, such that responses could be more active and the public could have more interaction with government, ultimately enhancing government legitimacy.

== Engagement of different players ==
=== HKSAR government ===
The Hong Kong government has implemented different policies to deal with the domestic waste problem. EDB is the department assigned to manage the domestic waste in the territory. The programme on Source Separation of Domestic Waste was launched territory-wide in 2005. This programme aims to decrease domestic waste. The rationale behind the programme is straightforward: landfills are running out of space, so it is necessary to reduce the wasteload. In recent years the government has tested various forms of domestic waste separation and recovery to identify systems that are convenient to residents, cost-effective and best suit local needs. This policy enacted by the government has been an element of the decisionmaking process as this policy has resulted in some positive effect on domestic waste management.

=== NGOs ===
NGOs such as Green Power, a local environmental organization, organized various protests to express opinions to policies related to environmental problems. NGOs are usually invited by governments to operate collection points in their existing premises. Their collection points are initially intended to collect recyclables of lower value and require NGOs to provide space for accepting recyclable waste at their premises, space for temporary storage of the collected recyclables and resources including manpower, hardware, etc., to operate the recycling facilities. They also promote waste reduction to the public; this would affect the consultation of the public to the government.

Friends of the Earth (FoE) in Hong Kong had done a series of things to help promoting waste reduction and monitoring the government in different filed of Hong Kong. FoE had organized a field trip to Taiwan where a place had done good jobs in the MSW programme; as Taiwan has implemented an advanced version (compared to Hong Kong) of the MSW programme which included a producer responsibility system, volume-based waste charge and an aggressive recycling of food waste. FoE has visited Taiwan in order to learn from other countries’ successful experiences, since it is one of the stakeholders during the policymaking process of the government; Learning about professional opinions from other countries can facilitate providing input to the government in the policymaking process.

Furthermore, FoE has always been a responsible monitor for the government since it was established. FoE has published more than ten articles and campaign against incinerators in response to the government’s policy about the implementation of incinerators, and they address the effects of incineration to show the government that incineration is the least-preferred method they want for solving domestic waste problems. In response to the MSW scheme suggested by the government, instead of just simply addressing their stances in the media, FoE organized campaigns to promote producer responsibility in Hong Kong because they believe that this is the most essential way to reduce MSW. In addition, they also proposed a proposal called “Full Recovery - Zero Waste” that aims to relieve pressure on landfills in Hong Kong and hoping the government can take the proposal into consideration and implement this into policies.

== See also ==
- Waste management in Hong Kong
- Air pollution in Hong Kong
- Environment of Hong Kong
- Sha Tin Sewage Treatment Works
