= San Hing Tsuen (Tuen Mun District) =

Village in Hong Kong

Coordinates: 22.417740°N 113.978719°E

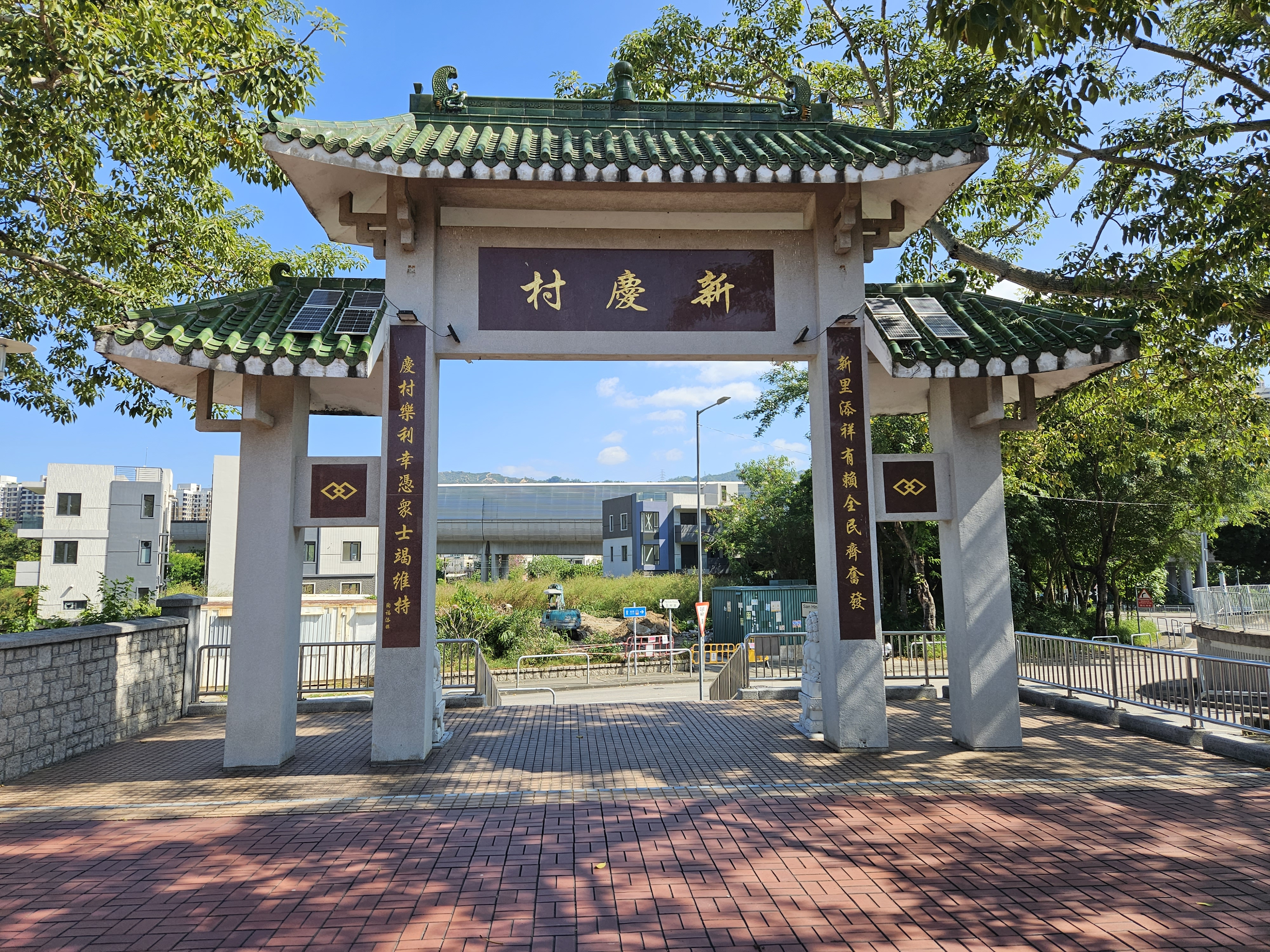
Paifang of San Hing Tsuen

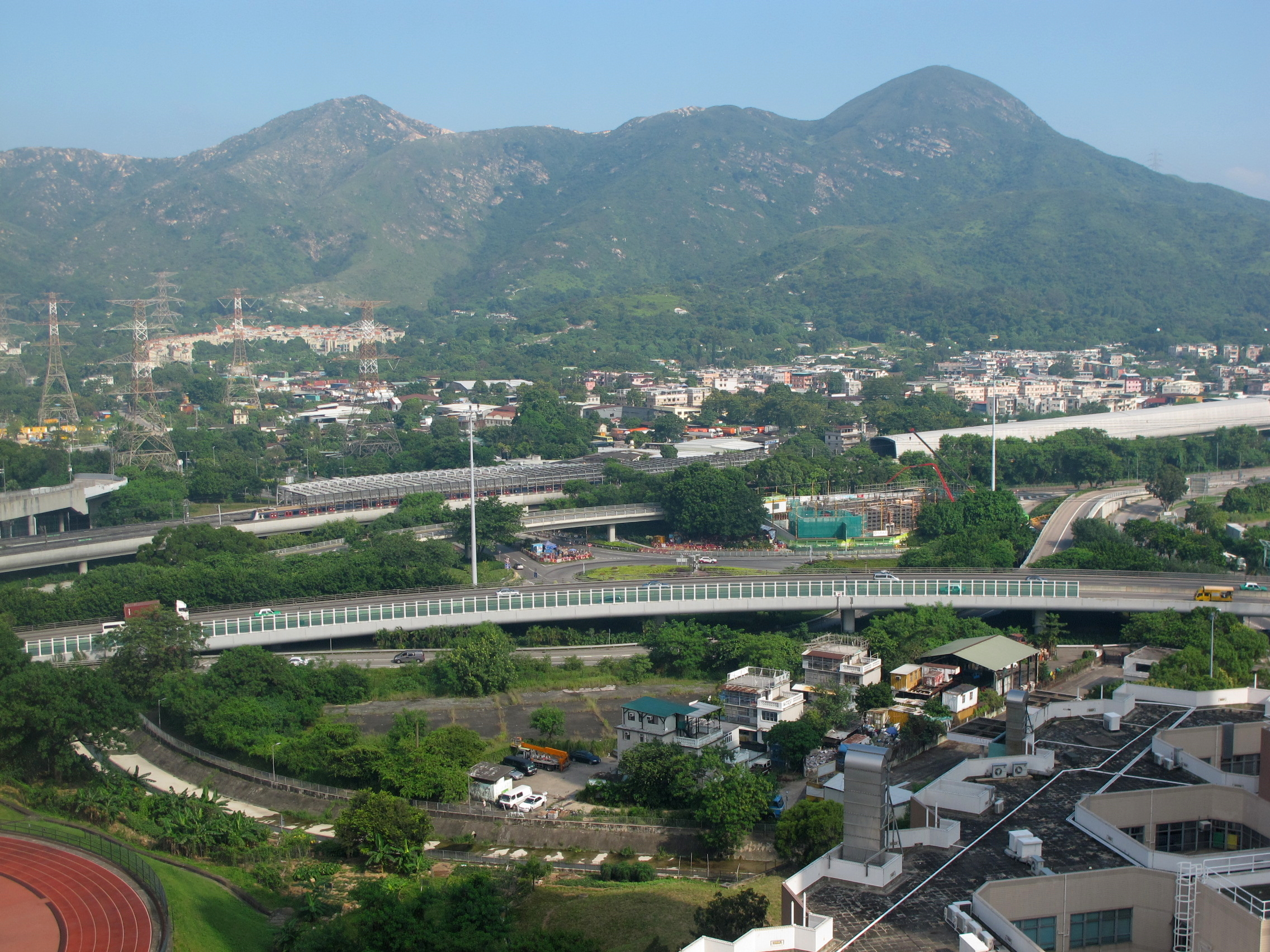
View of San Hing Tsuen (left) and Tuen Tsz Wai (right), with Yuen Tau Shan in the background (hill on the right).

San Hing Tsuen (Chinese: 新慶村) is a village in Lam Tei, Tuen Mun District, Hong Kong.

== Administration ==
San Hing Tsuen is a recognized village under the New Territories Small House Policy. It is one of the 36 villages represented within the Tuen Mun Rural Committee. For electoral purposes, San Hing Tsuen is part of the Yan Tin constituency.

== See also ==
- Tuen Tsz Wai, a village adjacent to San Hing Tsuen (north east)
- Tsz Tin Tsuen, a village adjacent to San Hing Tsuen (south west)
