= Tseng Tau Tsuen =

Village in Hong Kong

Coordinates: 22.391316°N 113.9816°E

Tseng Tau Tsuen (Chinese: 井頭村) is a village in Tuen Mun District, Hong Kong.

Tseng Tau Tsuen comprises Tseng Tau Chung Tsuen (井頭中村; 'Middle Tseng Tau Tsuen'), Tseng Tau Ha Tsuen (井頭下村; 'Lower Tseng Tau Tsuen'), Tseng Tau Sheung Tsuen South (井頭上村南; 'Upper Tseng Tau Tsuen South') and Tseng Tau Sheung Tsuen North (井頭上村北; 'Upper Tseng Tau Tsuen North')..

== Administration ==
Administratively, Tseng Tau Tsuen comprises Tseng Tau Tsuen (Middle and Lower) and Tseng Tau Tsuen (Upper), two of the 36 villages represented within the Tuen Mun Rural Committee.

== Education ==
Tseng Tau Tsuen is in Primary One Admission (POA) School Net 71. Within the school net are multiple aided schools (operated independently but funded with government money); no government schools are in the school net.
