= Luen On San Tsuen =

Coordinates: 22.364867°N 114.019384°E

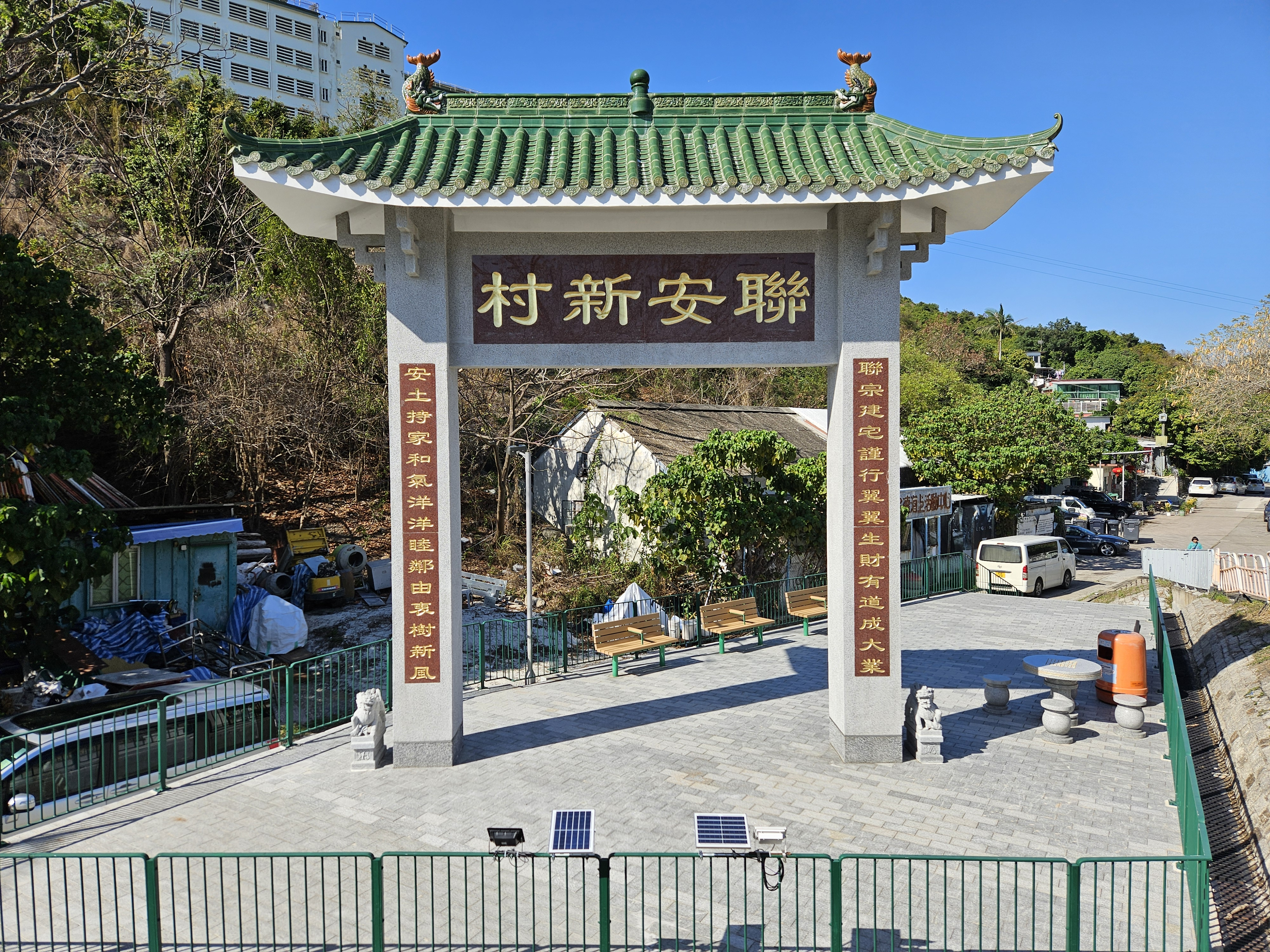
Paifang of Luen On San Tsuen.

Luen On San Tsuen (Chinese: 聯安新村) is a village in Tuen Mun District, Hong Kong.

== Administration ==
Luen On San Tsuen is one of the 36 villages represented within the Tuen Mun Rural Committee.
