= Tsang Tsui =

Area of Hong Kong

Coordinates: 22.41795°N 113.92099°E

Tsang Tsui (Chinese: 曾咀) is a place in Tuen Mun District, Hong Kong. It faces Shenzhen Bay and Shekou Port towards the northwest, and is bordered by Lung Kwu Tan to the west, and Nim Wan to the east.

== History ==
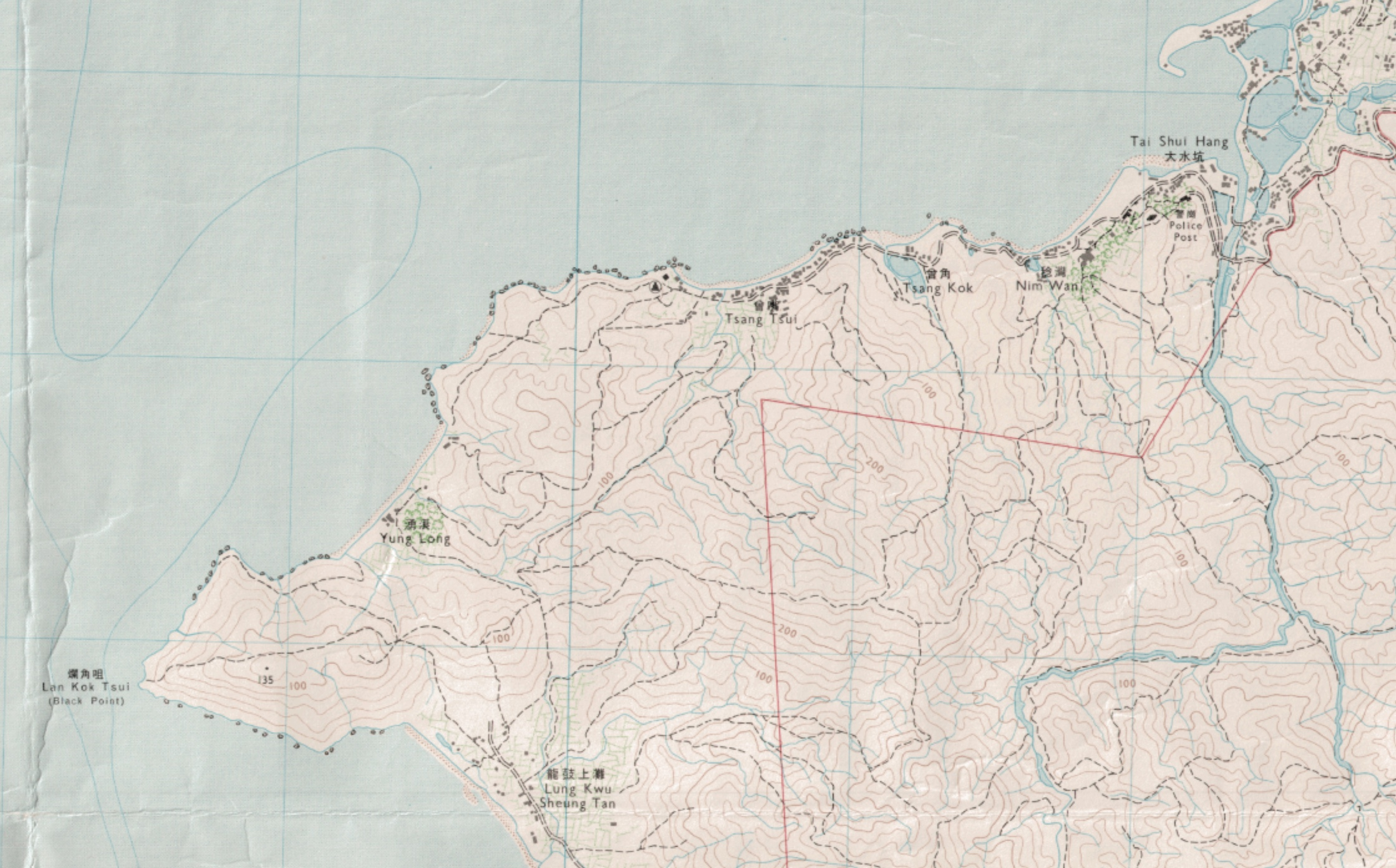
Tsang Tsui as documented in a map from 1975.

Tsang Tsui was previously a bay with a beach and a rocky coast, home to a village of the same name. The village was first documented in 1975.

In 1986, the Government reclaimed land along the shore, and the oyster beds and the beaches were removed, in order to build the coal lakes for CLP Power. Most residents lost their livelihoods, and many were displaced to So Kwun Wat. This caused environmental damage throughout the area.

In 1987, a BBC radio station began its operations here, aiming to spread propaganda towards Mainland China; it was suspended in 1997 before the Handover of Hong Kong.

In 1993, Black Point Power Station and the New Territories West Landfill were constructed nearby.

== Current ==
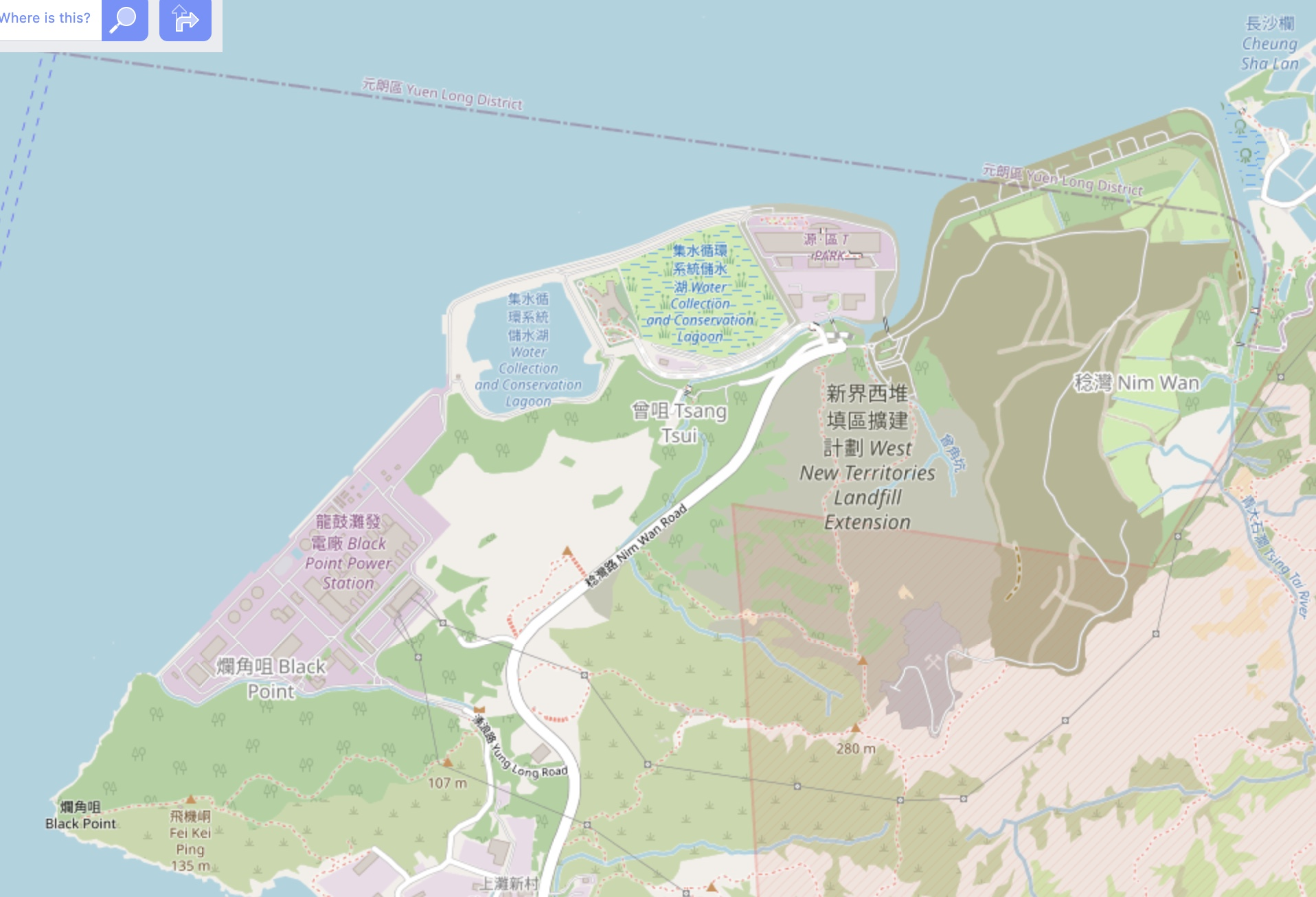
Tsang Tsui (from OpenStreetMap)

In the 2000s, the coal lakes were returned to the Government. In 2013, T-Park, an environmental education center, was built upon the east lake. The Tuen Mun Tsang Tsui Columbarium was built upon the western portion of the original central lake, costing 2.88 billion HKD in 2015.

== Access ==
The only access is through Nim Wan Road from the south via Lung Kwu Tan, Pillar Point and Tuen Mun. The section leading northward is interrupted due to limited access through the New Territories West Landfill. Shuttle buses are provided for T-Park by booking.

== See also ==
- Nim Wan
- Tuen Mun
