= To Yuen Wai =

Village in Hong Kong

Coordinates: 22.416313°N 113.98422°E

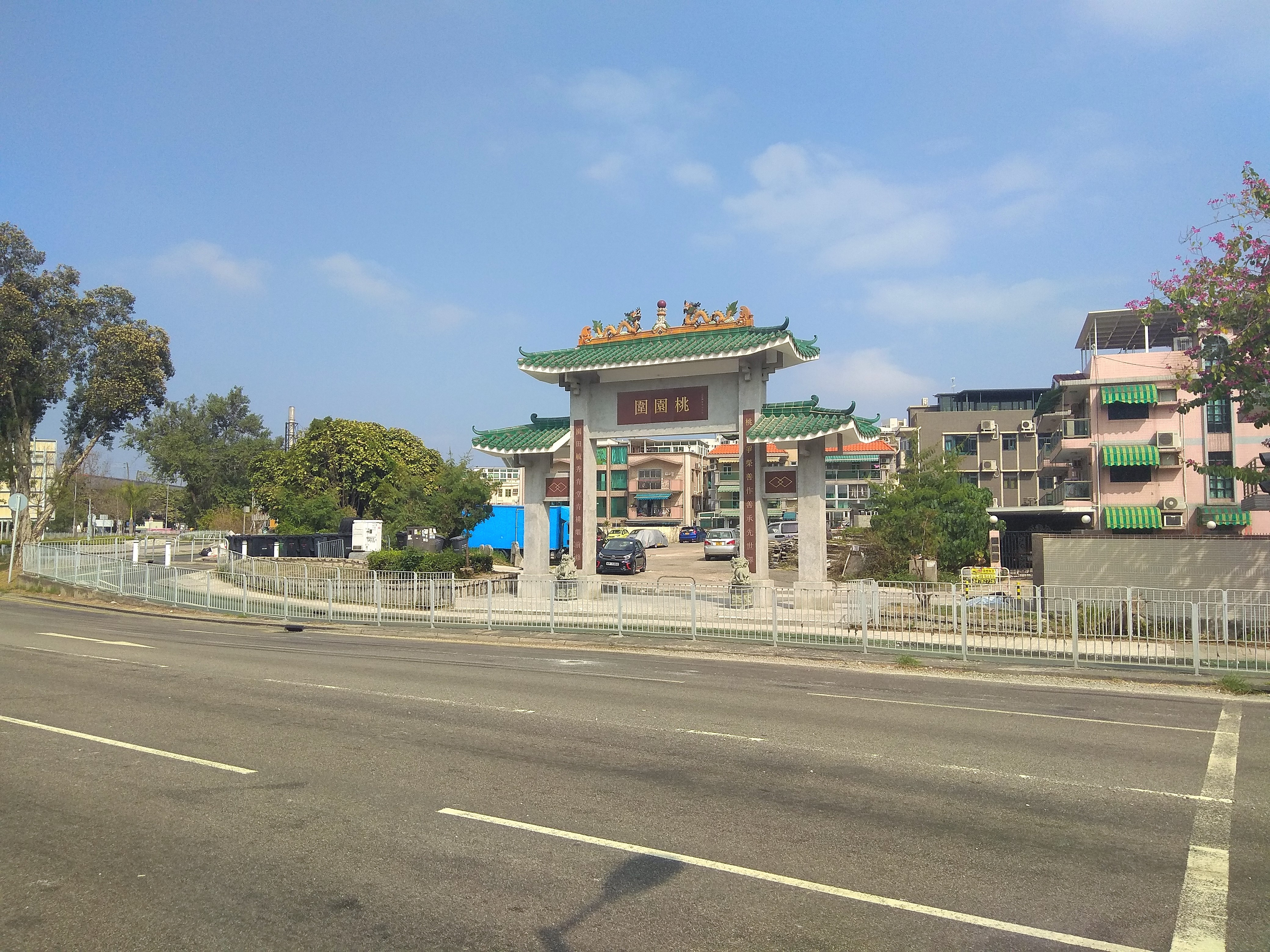
Entrance gate of To Yuen Wai.

To Yuen Wai (Chinese: 桃園圍) is a village in Lam Tei, Tuen Mun District, Hong Kong.

== Administration ==
To Yuen Wai is a recognized village under the New Territories Small House Policy. It is one of the 36 villages represented within the Tuen Mun Rural Committee.
