= Yan Tin (constituency) =

Constituency in Tuen Mun District

- 欣田
- Elected constituency for the Tuen Mun District Council
- Boundary of Yan Tin in Yuen Long District
- District: Tuen Mun
- Legislative Council constituency: New Territories North West
- Population: 16,746 (2019)
- Electorate: 6,416 (2019)

Current constituency
- Created: 2019
- Number of members: One
- Member: Apple Lai Ka-man (DAB)
- Created from: Po Tin

Yan Tin (Chinese: 欣田) is one of the 31 constituencies in the Tuen Mun District.

Created for the 2019 District Council elections, the constituency returns one district councillor to the Tuen Mun District Council, with an election every four years.

Yan Tin loosely covers areas surrounding Yan Tin Estate and San Hing Tsuen in Tuen Mun. It has projected population of 16,746.

== Councillors represented ==
Election	Member	Party
2019	Apple Lai Ka-man	DAB

== Election results ==
=== 2010s ===
Tuen Mun District Council Election, 2019: Yan Tin
Party	Candidate	Votes	%	±%
DAB	Apple Lai Ka-man	2,203	47.08	
Democratic	Lo Wai-ming	1,865	39.86	
Roundtable	Wong Chi-chun	611	13.06	
Majority		338	7.22	
Turnout		4,688	73.12	
DAB win (new seat)				
