= Ho Tin Tsuen =

Coordinates: 22.399567°N 113.964859°E

Ho Tin Tsuen (Chinese: 河田村) is a village in Tuen Mun District, Hong Kong.

== Administration ==
Ho Tin Tsuen is one of the 36 villages represented within the Tuen Mun Rural Committee.
