= Kei Lun Wai =

Coordinates: 22.41175°N 113.97547°E

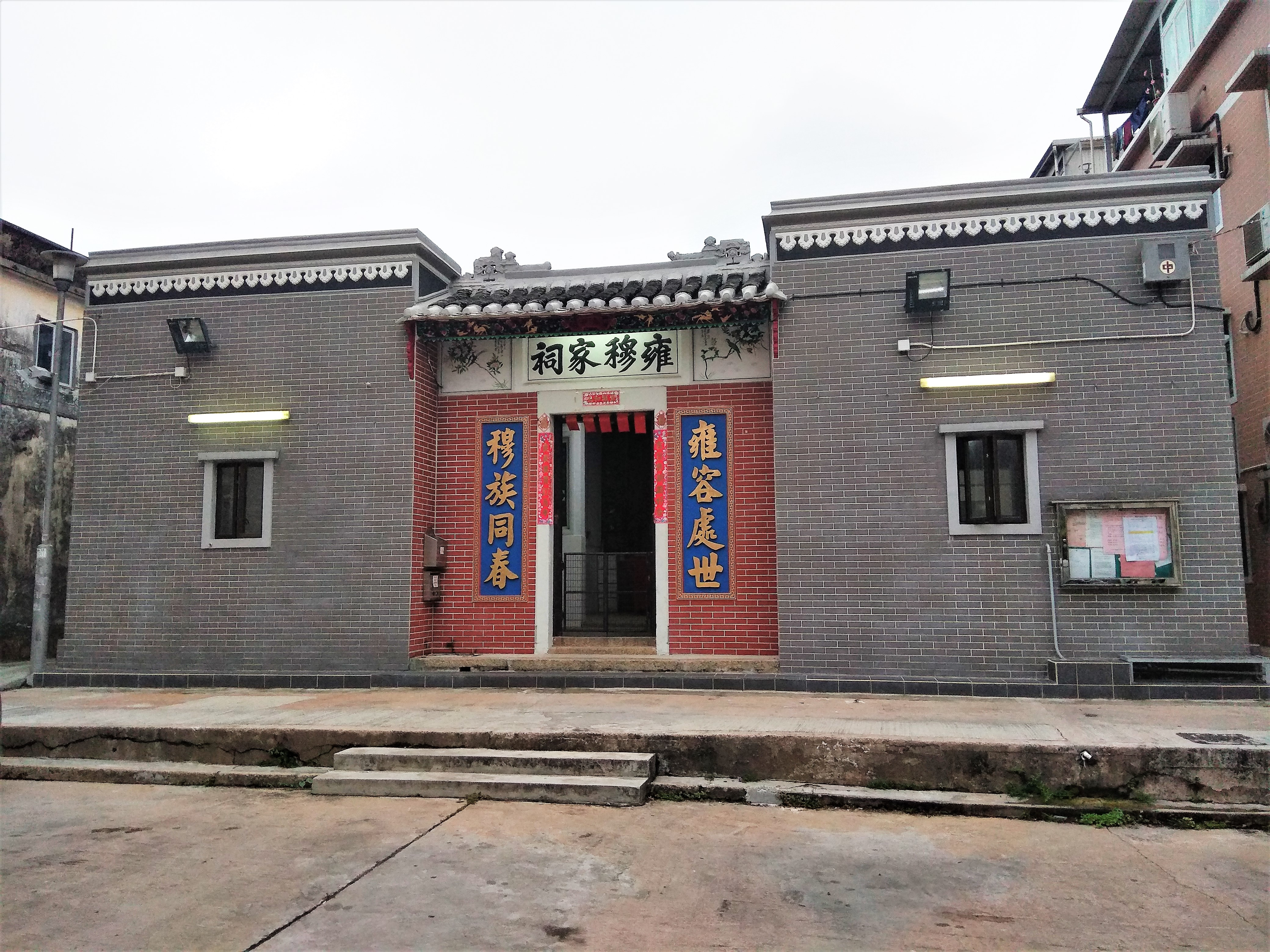
Yung Muk Ancestral Hall (雍穆家祠) in Kei Lun Wai.

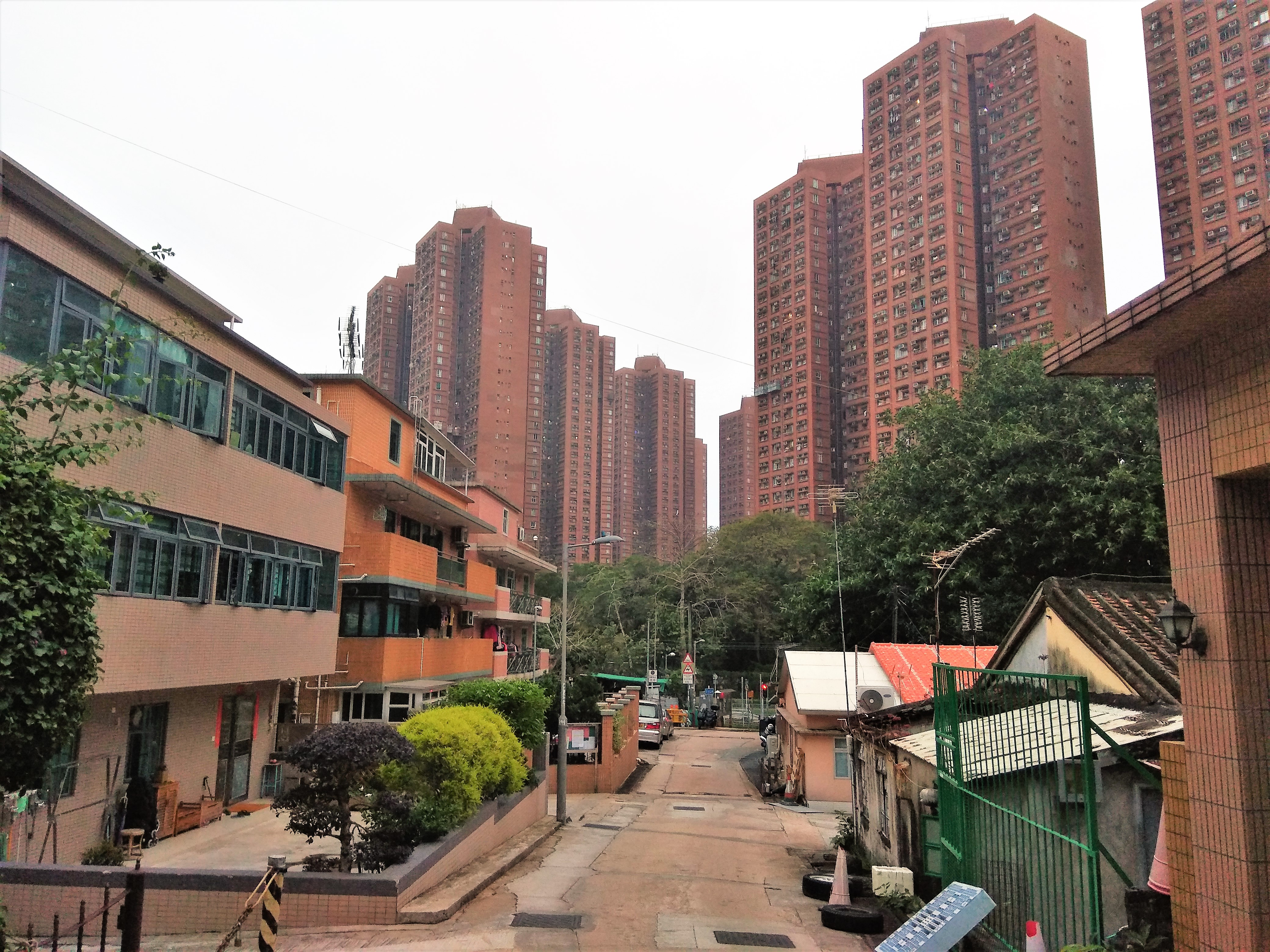
Siu Hong Court seen from Kei Lun Wai.

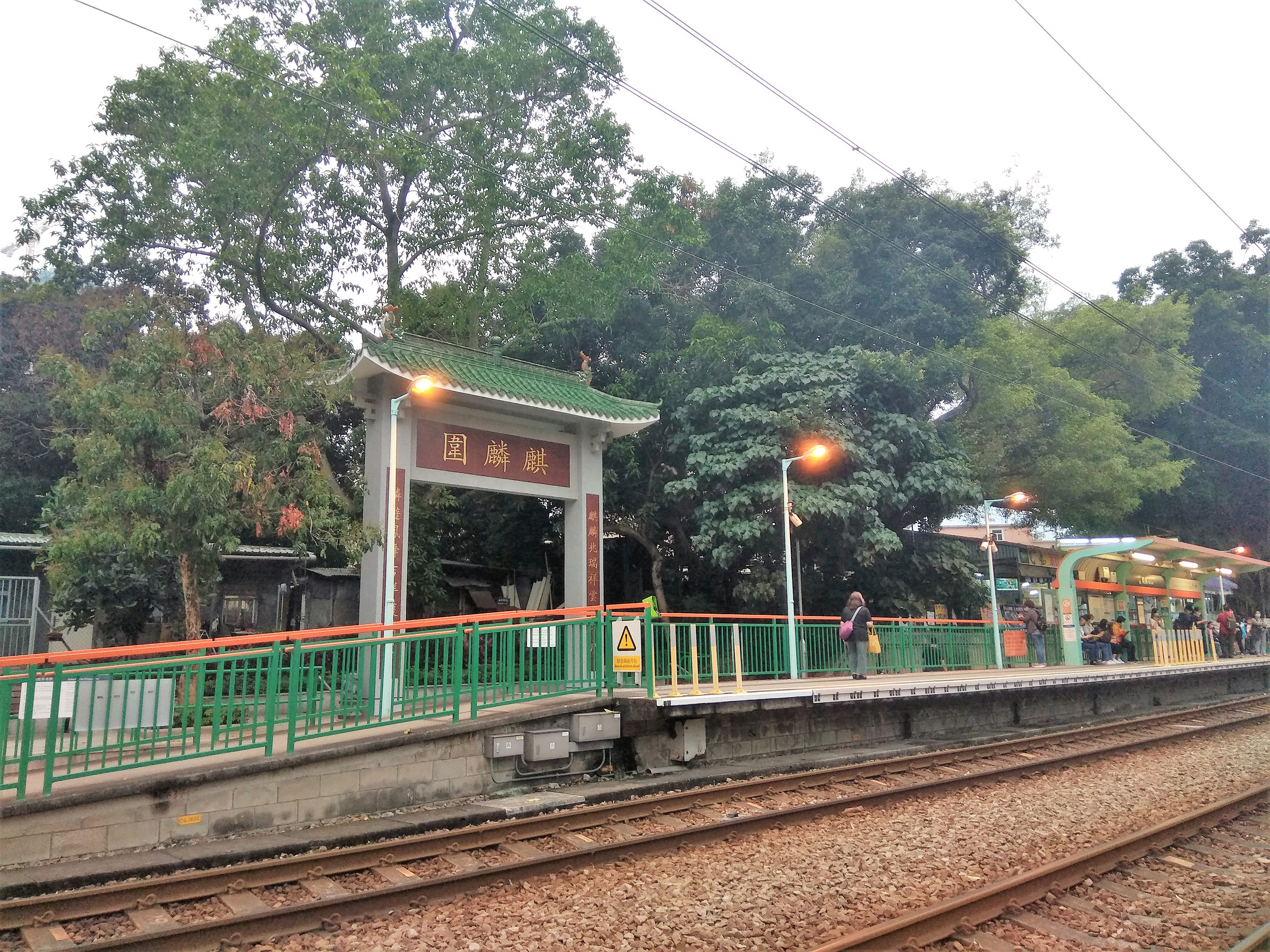
Paifang of Kei Lun Wai near Kei Lun stop of the MTR Light Rail.

Kei Lun Wai (Chinese: 麒麟圍) is a village in Tuen Mun District, Hong Kong.

== Administration ==
Kei Lun Wai is a recognized village under the New Territories Small House Policy. It is one of the 36 villages represented within the Tuen Mun Rural Committee. For electoral purposes, Kei Lun Wai is part of the Po Tin constituency.

== History ==
Archaeological deposits in Siu Hang Tsuen and Kei Lun Wai were discovered in 1997 during a survey carried out by a team from Zhongshan University. The findings indicated occupation of the area from the Song, Ming and Qing periods.

== Education ==
Kei Lun Wai is in Primary One Admission (POA) School Net 70. Within the school net are multiple aided schools (operated independently but funded with government money) and the following government schools: Tuen Mun Government Primary School (屯門官立小學).

== See also ==
- Kei Lun stop
