= Kwai Chung Estate =

Public housing estate in Kwai Chung, Hong Kong

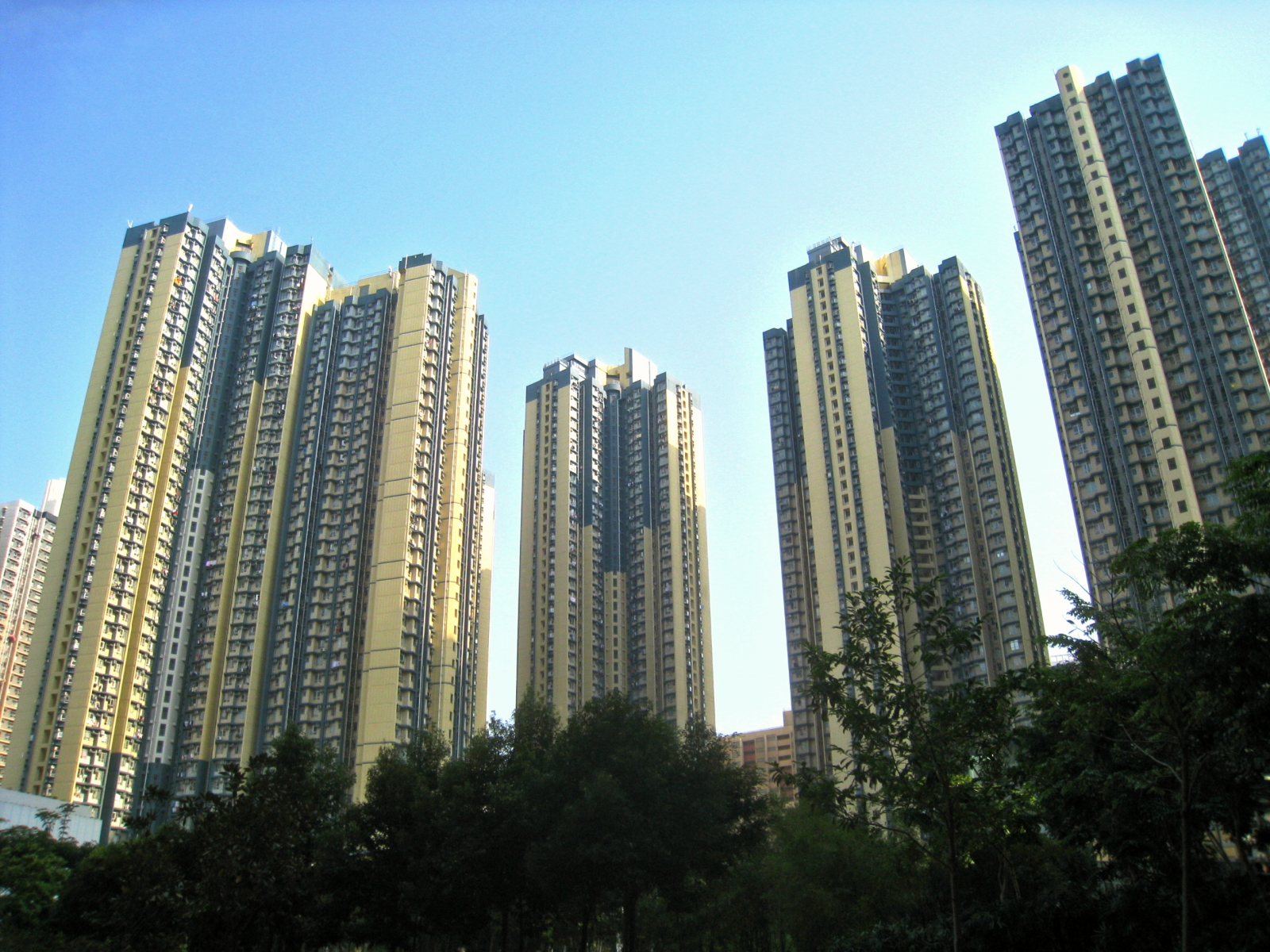
- Phase 3 of Kwai Chung Estate
- Interactive map of Kwai Chung Estate

General information
- Location: 30 Kwai Hop Street, Kwai Chung; New Territories, Hong Kong
- Coordinates: 22.3673779°N 114.1273056°E
- Status: Completed
- Category: Public rental housing
- Population: 38,674 (2016)
- No. of blocks: 16
- No. of units: 11,759

Construction
- Constructed: 1964; 62 years ago (Before reconstruction); 1997; 29 years ago (After reconstruction)
- Authority: Hong Kong Housing Authority

Kwai Chung Estate (Chinese: 葵涌邨) is a public housing estate in Kwai Chung, New Territories, Hong Kong. It is the largest public housing estate in Kwai Tsing District and consists of sixteen residential buildings completed between 1997 and 2008.

== History ==
The phase 1 and phase 3–5 of its redevelopment were completed progressively in 1997, 2000 and 2005. Starting from 1993, the Housing Department has embarked on the redevelopment of Kwai Chung Estate. After 12 years of work, the entire redevelopment project was realised in 2005. Being the largest public housing estate in Hong Kong, Kwai Chung Estate provides 11,759 rental flats for about 33,300 people. The redevelopment works also include realignment of Sheung Kok Street, road improvement works and the allocation of 800 flats in Kwai Fuk Court for government quarters. It features commercial centre, carpark, public transport interchange, post office, social welfare and recreational facilities. Pak Kwai House and Hop Kwai House were built on the site of the former Kwai Chung Factory Estate.

Kwai Chung Estate was the location of a COVID related lockdown in January 2022 due to the Omicron variant. 2700 residents were placed under the 5-7 day lockdown, and 447 infections have been confirmed.

== Houses ==
Name	Chinese name	Building type	Completed
Chun Kwai House	春葵樓	Harmony 1	1997
Ha Kwai House	夏葵樓	Harmony 1	1997
Chau Kwai House	秋葵樓	Harmony 1	1997
Yan Kwai House	茵葵樓	Single Aspect Building	2000
Pik Kwai House	碧葵樓	New Harmony 1	2005
Chui Kwai House	翠葵樓	New Harmony 1	2005
Chin Kwai House	芊葵樓	New Harmony 1	2005
Nga Kwai House	雅葵樓	New Harmony 1	2005
Yuk Kwai House	旭葵樓	New Harmony 1	2005
Ying Kwai House	映葵樓	New Harmony 1	2005
Hiu Kwai House	曉葵樓	New Harmony 1	2005
Luk Kwai House	綠葵樓	New Harmony 1	2005
Tsz Kwai House	芷葵樓	New Harmony 1	2005
Yat Kwai House	逸葵樓	New Harmony 1	2005
Pak Kwai House	百葵樓	New Harmony 1	2008
Hop Kwai House	合葵樓	New Harmony 1	2008

== Demographics ==
According to the 2016 by-census, Kwai Chung Estate had a population of 38,674. The median age was 40.7 and the majority of residents (98 per cent) were of Chinese ethnicity. The average household size was 2.8 people. The median monthly household income of all households (i.e. including both economically active and inactive households) was HK$19,370.

== Politics ==
For the 2019 District Council election, the estate fell within two constituencies. Most of the estate is located in the Kwai Chung Estate South constituency, which was formerly represented by Ivan Wong Yun-tat until May 2021, while the remainder of the estate falls within the Kwai Chung Estate North constituency, which was represented by Simon Leung Kam-wai until November 2021.

== See also ==
- Public housing estates in Kwai Chung
