= Po Tin (constituency) =

Hong Kong constituency

- 寶田
- Elected constituency for the Tuen Mun District Council
- Boundary of Po Tin in Tuen Mun District
- District: Tuen Mun
- Legislative Council constituency: New Territories North West
- Population: 15,431 (2019)
- Electorate: 7,327 (2019)

Current constituency
- Created: 2003
- Number of members: One
- Member: So Ka-man (Independent)

Po Tin (Chinese: 寶田) is one of the 31 constituencies in the Tuen Mun District.

Created for the 2003 District Council elections, the constituency returns one district councillor to the Tuen Mun District Council, with an election every four years.

Po Tin loosely covers areas surrounding Grand Villa, Kei Lun Wai, Ming Wong Garden, Po Tin Estate, Po Tong Ha, Po Wah Garden and Siu Hang Tsuen in Tuen Mun with an estimated population of 15,431.

== Councillors represented ==
Election	Member	Party
2011	So Ka-man	NPP
2017	So Ka-man	Roundtable
2020	So Ka-man	Independent

== Election results ==
=== 2010s ===
Tuen Mun District Council Election, 2019: Shan King
Party	Candidate	Votes	%	±%
Roundtable	So Ka-man	2,562	57.61	
Ind. democrat	Cheung Tsan-wa	1,885	42.39	
Majority		677	15.22	
Turnout		4,468	61.04	
Roundtable hold		Swing		
