= Kwai Chung Estate South (constituency) =

Hong Kong constituency

- Elected constituency for the Kwai Tsing District Council
- Boundary of Kwai Chung Estate South in Kwai Tsing District
- District: Kwai Tsing
- Legislative Council constituency: New Territories South West
- Population: 21,829 (2019)
- Electorate: 11,177 (2019)

Current constituency
- Created: 2011
- Number of members: One
- Member: Vacant

Kwai Chung Estate South (Chinese: 葵涌邨南), previously Kwai Chung Estate Central, is one of the 31 constituencies of the Kwai Tsing District Council in Hong Kong. The seat elects one member of the council every four years. It was first created in the 2011 elections. Its boundary is loosely based on part of Kwai Chung Estate and Kwai Fuk Court in Kwai Chung with an estimated population of 21,829.

== Councillors represented ==
Election	Member	Party
2011	Ivan Wong Yun-tat	NWSC
2015	Ivan Wong Yun-tat	NWSC→Independent democrat
2019	Ivan Wong Yun-tat→Vacant (Note: Resigned on 31 May 2021 over new oath-taking law.)	Independent democrat

== Election results ==
=== 2010s ===
Kwai Tsing District Council Election, 2019: Kwai Chung Estate South
Party	Candidate	Votes	%	±%
PfD	Wong Yun-tat	4,240	55.60	
DAB	Lee Wang-fung	3,284	43.06	
Nonpartisan	Cheung Ching-hing	102	1.34	
Majority		956	12.54	
Turnout		7,641	68.42	
PfD hold		Swing		
