= Tsing Lun Road =

Road in Tuen Mun, New Territories, Hong Kong

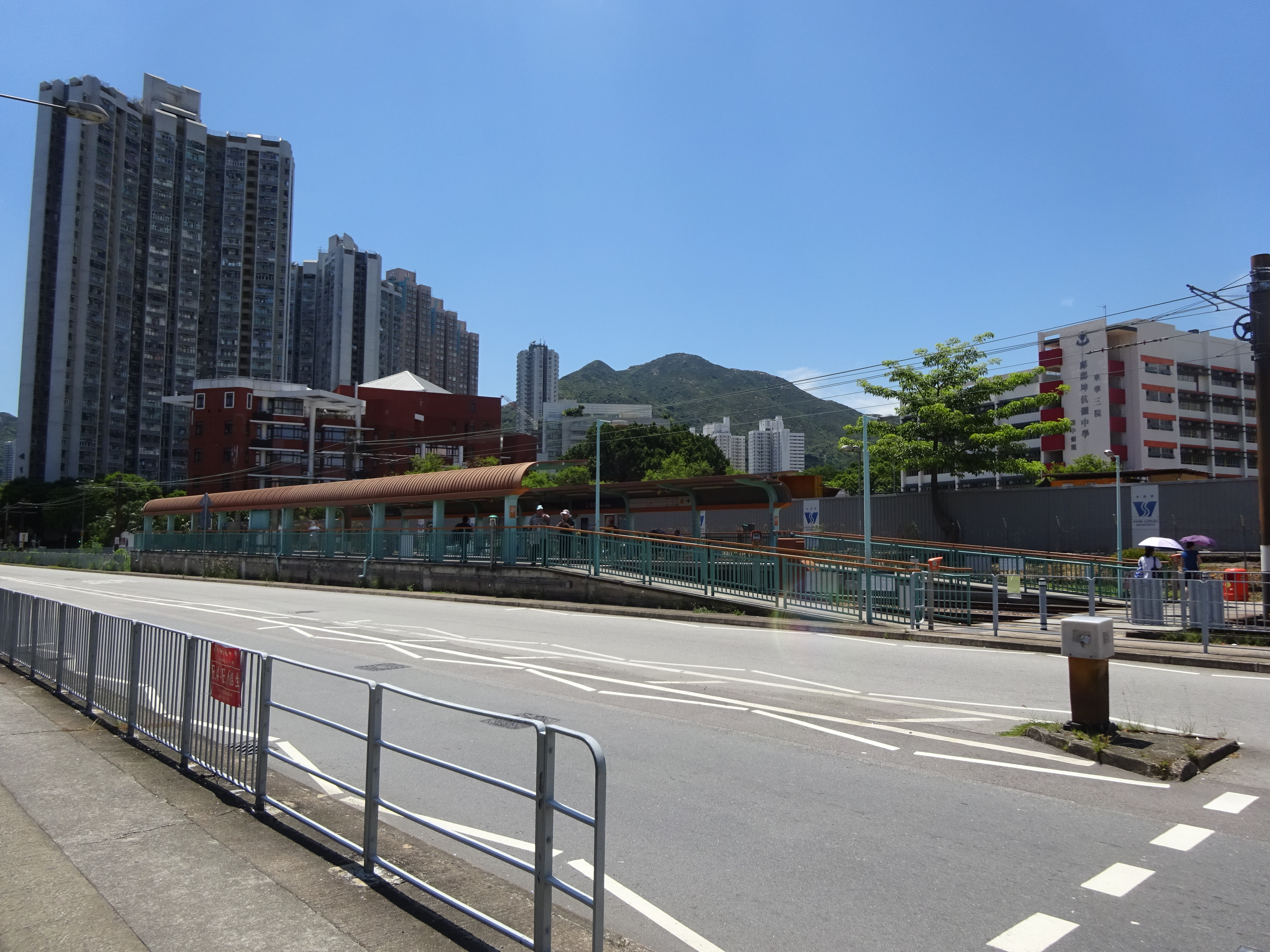
Tsing Lun Road near Light Rail Ching Chung stop.

Tsing Lun Road (Chinese: 青麟路) is a road in Northwest Tuen Mun District, New Territories, Hong Kong. It connects Lam Tei Interchange on one end and Tsun Wen Road on the other.

== See also ==
- List of streets and roads in Hong Kong
