= Siu Hang Tsuen (Tuen Mun District) =

Village in Hong Kong

Siu Hang Tsuen Chinese: 小坑村
- Village
- Location within Hong Kong
- Coordinates: 22.414433°N 113.971553°E
- Country: People's Republic of China
- Special administrative region: Hong Kong
- District: Tuen Mun District
- Time zone: UTC+8:00 (HKT)

Siu Hang Tsuen (Chinese: 小坑村) is a village in Tuen Mun District, Hong Kong.

== Administration ==
Siu Hang Tsuen is a recognized village under the New Territories Small House Policy. It is one of the 36 villages represented within the Tuen Mun Rural Committee. For electoral purposes, Siu Hang Tsuen is part of the Po Tin constituency.

== History ==
Archaeological deposits in Siu Hang Tsuen and Kei Lun Wai were discovered in 1997 during a survey carried out by a team from Zhongshan University. The findings indicated occupation of the area from the Song, Ming and Qing periods.

== Features ==
The Hong Kong Fengshan Temple (香港鳳山寺) is located in Siu Hang Tsuen.

== See also ==
- Po Tong Ha, a village located directly north of Siu Hang Tsuen
