= Food waste recycling in Hong Kong =

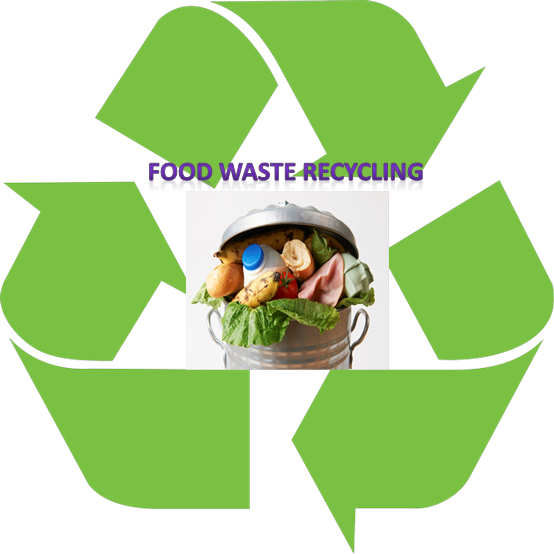
Food waste recycling

Food waste recycling is a process to convert food waste into useful materials and products for achieving sustainability of the environment. Food waste is defined as all parts of food, inedible and edible, created before, during, and after food processing, production, and consumption. Greenhouse gases, especially methane can be reduced by food waste recycling. Food waste recycling can also alleviate the saturation of landfill sites in Hong Kong.

== Background ==
=== Current situation of food waste in Hong Kong ===
The amount of food waste accounts for 38% of the municipal solid waste in Hong Kong. According to the statistics published by the Environmental Protection Department, Hong Kong generates approximately 3,648 tonnes of food waste each day. About one-third of the food waste comes from the commercial and industrial sectors while the remaining part is from households. The situation of food waste disposal in Hong Kong has become more serious in recent years. The amount of food waste from the commercial and industry sectors increased from 400 tonnes in 2002 to 1033 tonnes in 2014.

=== Three steps of food waste recycling in Hong Kong ===
Food waste recycling typically involves a three-step strategy that includes separation, collection and recycling. These three steps are interdependent and equally important in efficiently generating useful resources from food waste recycling.

==== Separation ====
The collected food waste is separated into two categories: pre-consumer food waste and post-consumer food waste. Pre-consumer food waste includes animal food waste, vegetable food waste, and waste from industrially-processed food. Post-consumer food waste refers to leftover food, such as from an unfinished restaurant order. Source separation also involves removing any food packaging and utensils.

==== Collection ====
Food waste vehicles, managed by the government, collect and deliver food waste to governmental recycling facilities. These recycling facilities, known as Organic Waste Treatment Facilities (OWTFs), will be spread across Hong Kong's districts. The government plans to construct 5–6 OWTF networks, with a goal of recycling 1300–1500 tonnes of food waste between 2014–2024. The first facility is planned to be built in Siu Ho Wan to serve Lantau Island and districts nearby. The second and third are projected to be built in Sha Ling and Shek Kong so as to serve the New Territories and West Kowloon.

The Environmental Protection Department also plans to construct two Organic Resources Recovery Centres (ORRCs) to collect the food waste and turn it into compost for recovery. These two centres will collectively be able to treat 500 tonnes of organic waste and divert 200–300 tonnes of waste from the landfills daily. The first Centre will also be located in Siu Ho Wan. The construction works commenced in December 2014 and it is expected to be commissioned in early 2018.

==== Recycling ====
Two technologies are used to turn food waste into biogas and useful products. The first technology is a low-carbon method that processes 100–300 tonnes of food waste per day. By applying this technology, it produces a source of the renewable energy biogas. It is estimated that the first Centre will be able to provide 14 million kWh of electricity to Hong Kong's power grid every year, which can power 3,000 households. The second technology converts food waste into succinic acid by using enzymes and bacteria. The residues can be processed to be animal feed, fertilizers and environmental-friendly cleansing products.

== Hong Kong Food Waste Recycling program ==
=== The Hong Kong Government ===
==== Food Waste Recycling Partnership Scheme ====
A food waste recycling partnership scheme was introduced by the Environmental Protection Department in 2009. The scheme was designed to promote a good practice on food waste management and enhance people’s experiences of separating and recycling food waste sources. The scheme collaborated with commercial and industrial sectors. Some members of the Hong Kong Government and that of the commercial and industrial sectors formed a working group for planning and managing the operation of the project. There are about 20–30 public and private organizations that participate in the scheme every year. In the project, all the participants will have a chance to practice the separation process of food waste sources. The collection process of separated food waste will be carried out by the Environmental Protection Department and the Kowloon Bay Pilot Composting Plant will be responsible for the recycling part. The scheme also consists of discussion sessions for the participating parties to share their experience of recycling food waste. All participants will receive a commendation certificate at the end of the project.

==== Food Waste Recycling Projects in Housing Estates ====
From November 2012 to July 2014, The Hong Kong Housing Authority implemented a trial scheme, named Food Waste Recycling Projects in Housing Estates, with an aim to promote waste recycling in housing estates. The scheme involved 14 estates with about 3,200 households. There were two modes adopted in the scheme; one is to convert food waste to fish grain by transporting them to a Central Food Waste Recycling plant. The other is to convert food waste into compost for farm by using micro-organisms.

==== Food Waste Recycling Scheme on Cheung Chau and Lamma Island ====
On 31 March 2012, The Environmental Protection Department introduced a recycling scheme on Cheung Chau and Lamma Island. The purpose of the scheme is to promote and encourage food waste recycling on both islands. Food waste collected from shops and restaurants would be transported to the food waste treatment facilities on the islands. The food waste would be converted to organic compost.

=== Non-governmental organization ===
==== Hong Kong Organic Waste Recycling Centre ====
Hong Kong Organic Waste Recycling Centre (HKOWRC) was established in 2011 as the first organic waste management consulting firm in Hong Kong. It combines local and foreign technologies to provide one-stop organic recycling services to customers. The assistance in collection of food waste solves problems of companies in immature recycling. Through commitment to different types of people, HKOWRC can promote and provide waste management training for particular customers.

===== Daily Food Waste Recycling Service =====
The objectives of the collection and recycling routine are to educate the general public in cherishing food as well as making good use of resources. The service encourages two-way cooperation for food waste recycling. HKOWRC aims to provide 24 hour recycling services particularly to livestock breeders, farmers, catering industry, schools and large-scale housing estates. For most of the cases, the recycled food waste is to be used by the service targets again for other purposes, therefore avoiding wastage of resources. For livestock breeders and farmers, the recycled food waste is converted to animal feeds and fertilizers that contain richer nutritional values than the conventional ones. It possibly gives higher yield. For catering industry, the recycled food waste is converted to crops which are grown from organic compost from HKOWRC for latest organic food at a special prize. For schools and housing estates, it aims to raise the awareness of food waste reduction when the recycling service reveals the huge amount of food wastes accumulated.

== See also ==
- Food rescue
- Food waste
- Recycling
- Waste management
- Waste hierarchy
