= Lam Tei Tsuen =

Coordinates: 22.419186°N 113.984023°E

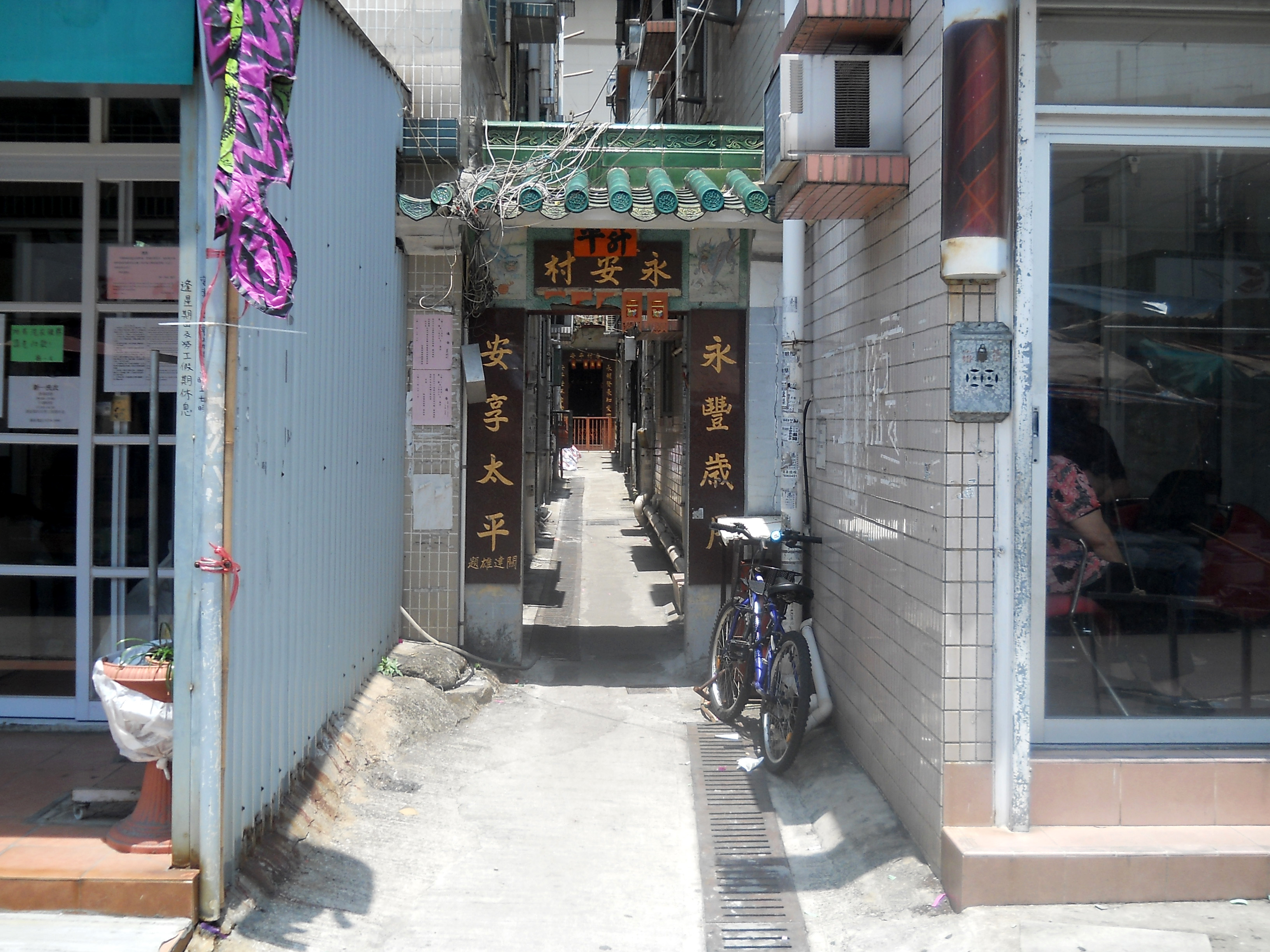
Entrance gate of Lam Tei Tsuen.

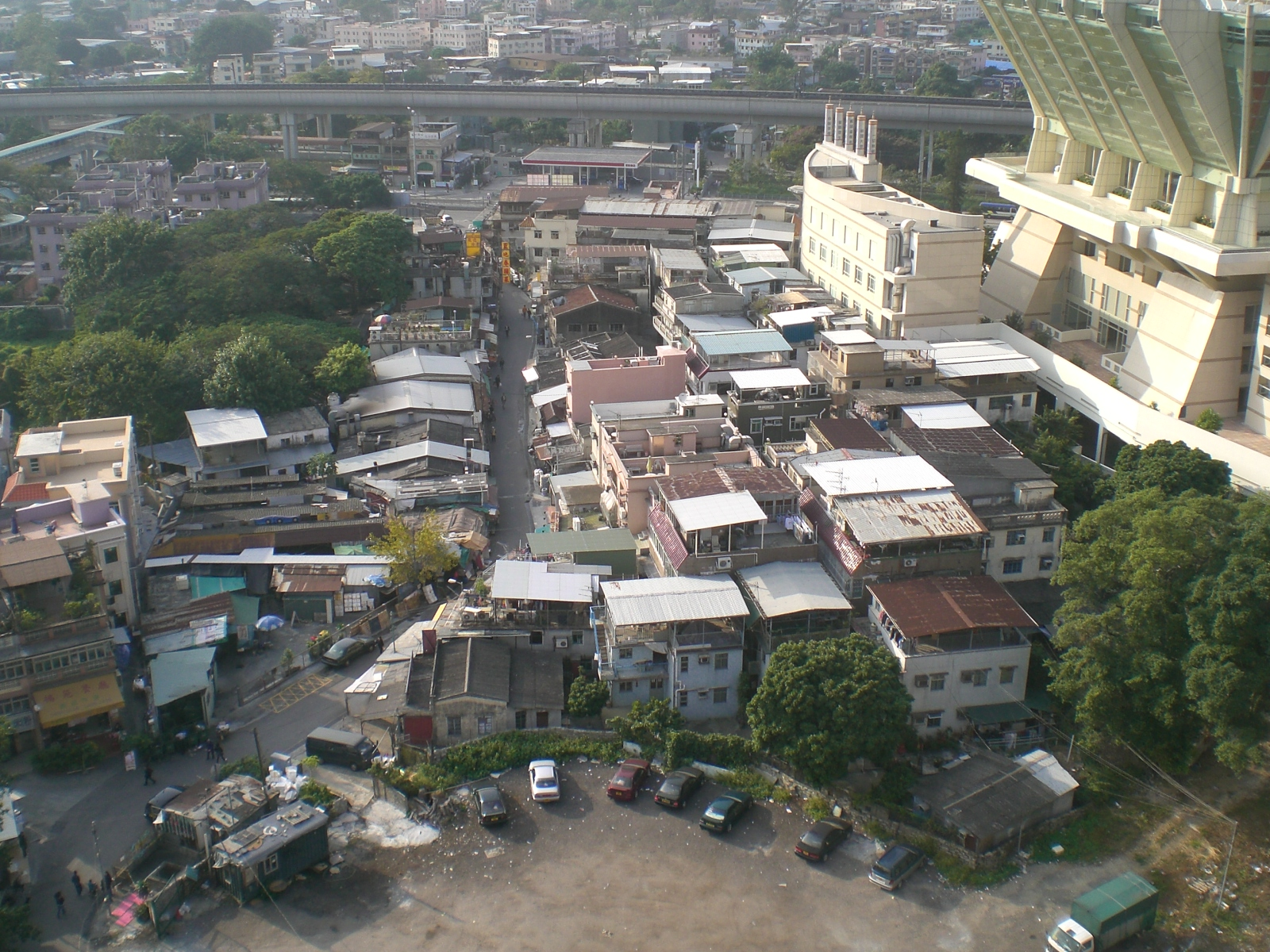
View of Lam Tei Tsuen, including Lam Tei Main Street (藍地大街) and Miu Fat Buddhist Monastery (right).

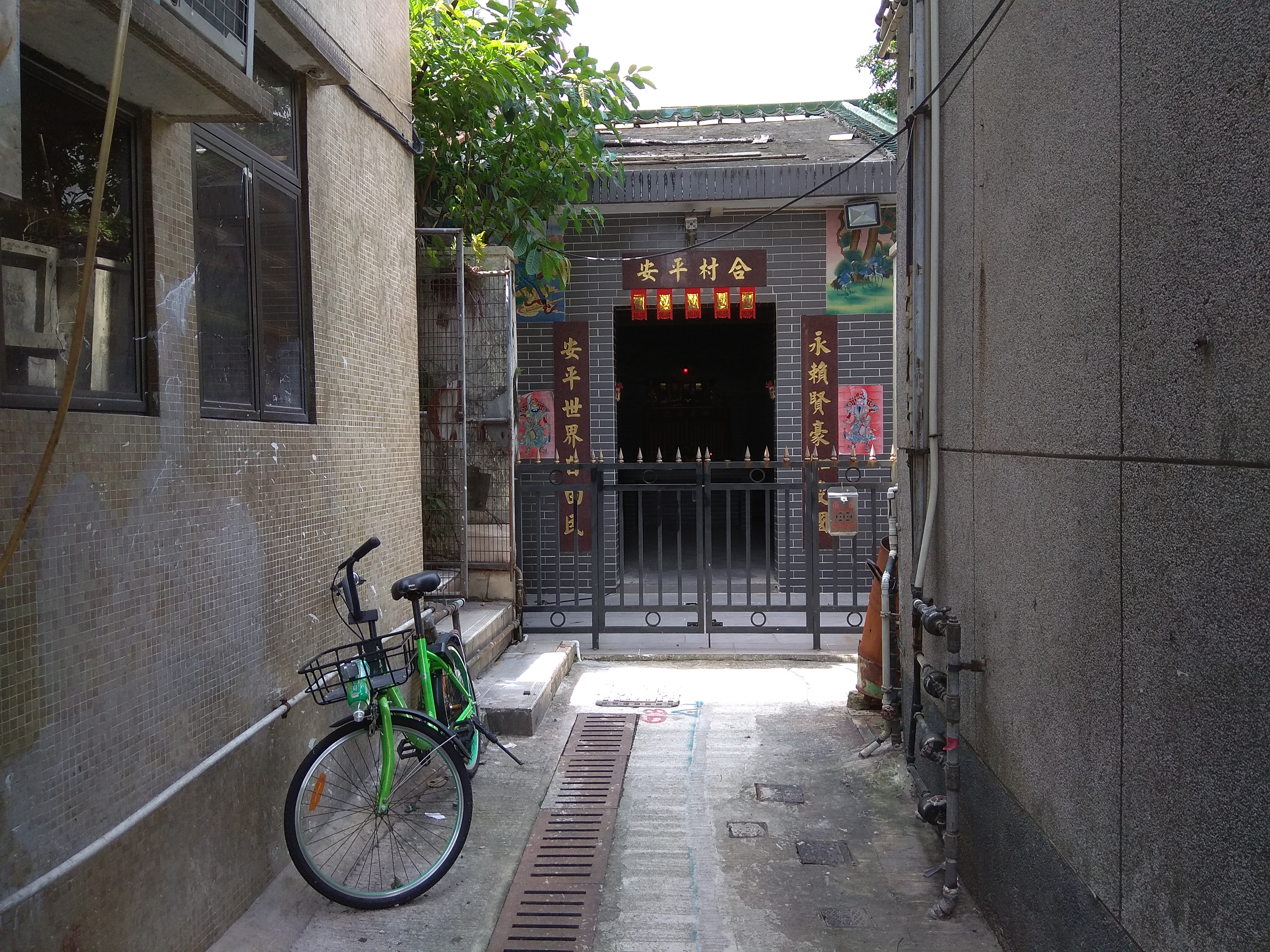
Village shrine of Lam Tei Tsuen.

Lam Tei Tsuen (Chinese: 藍地村) is a walled village in Lam Tei, Tuen Mun District, Hong Kong.

== Administration ==
Lam Tei Tsuen is a recognized village under the New Territories Small House Policy. It is one of the 36 villages represented within the Tuen Mun Rural Committee. For electoral purposes, Lam Tei Tsuen is part of the Tuen Mun Rural constituency, which is currently represented by Kenneth Cheung Kam-hung.

== History ==
Several villages of the Lam Tei area were established by the To (陶) Clan. Originally from Poyang, Jiangxi (other sources mention Watlam in Guangxi), the To Clan moved to Ngau Tam Mei and then to Tuen Mun Tai Tsuen. Following the increase of the clan population, the village dispersed and developed into five villages in the Lam Tei area: Nai Wai, Tsing Chuen Wai, Tuen Tsz Wai, Lam Tei Tsuen and Tuen Mun San Tsuen, which were all fortified.

== See also ==
- Walled villages of Hong Kong
