= Sun Fung Wai =

Walled village in Hong Kong

Sun Fung Wai Chinese: 順風圍
- Village
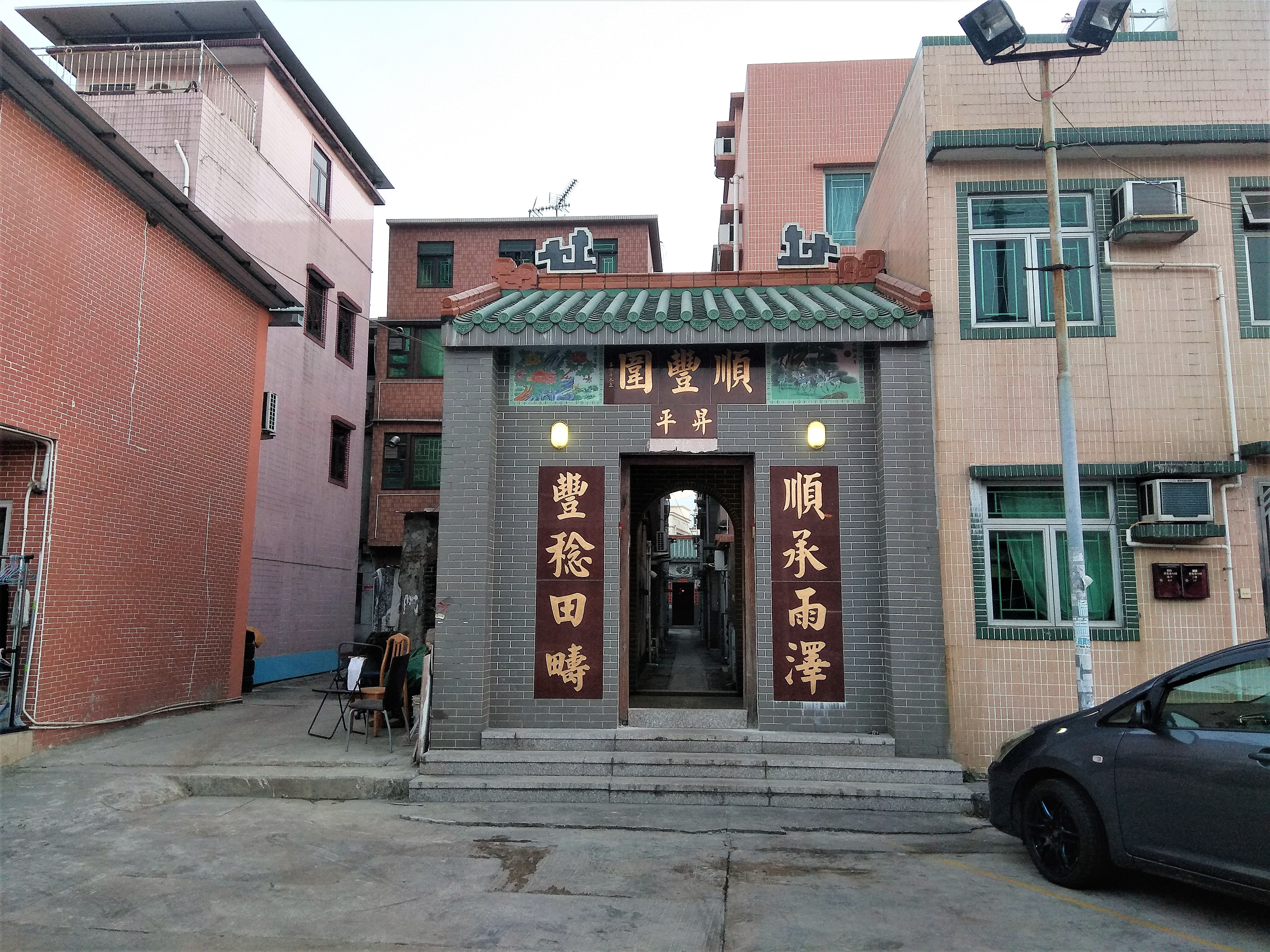
- Entrance gate of Sun Fung Wai in 2021.

- Location within Hong Kong
- Coordinates: 22.424334°N 113.988679°E
- Area: Lam Tei
- District: Tuen Mun District
- Statutorily-defined area: New Territories
- Special administrative region: Hong Kong
- Country: People's Republic of China
- Time zone: UTC+8:00 (HKT)

Sun Fung Wai, sometimes transliterated as Shun Fung Wai (Chinese: 順風圍), is a walled village in Lam Tei, Tuen Mun District, Hong Kong.

== Recognised status ==
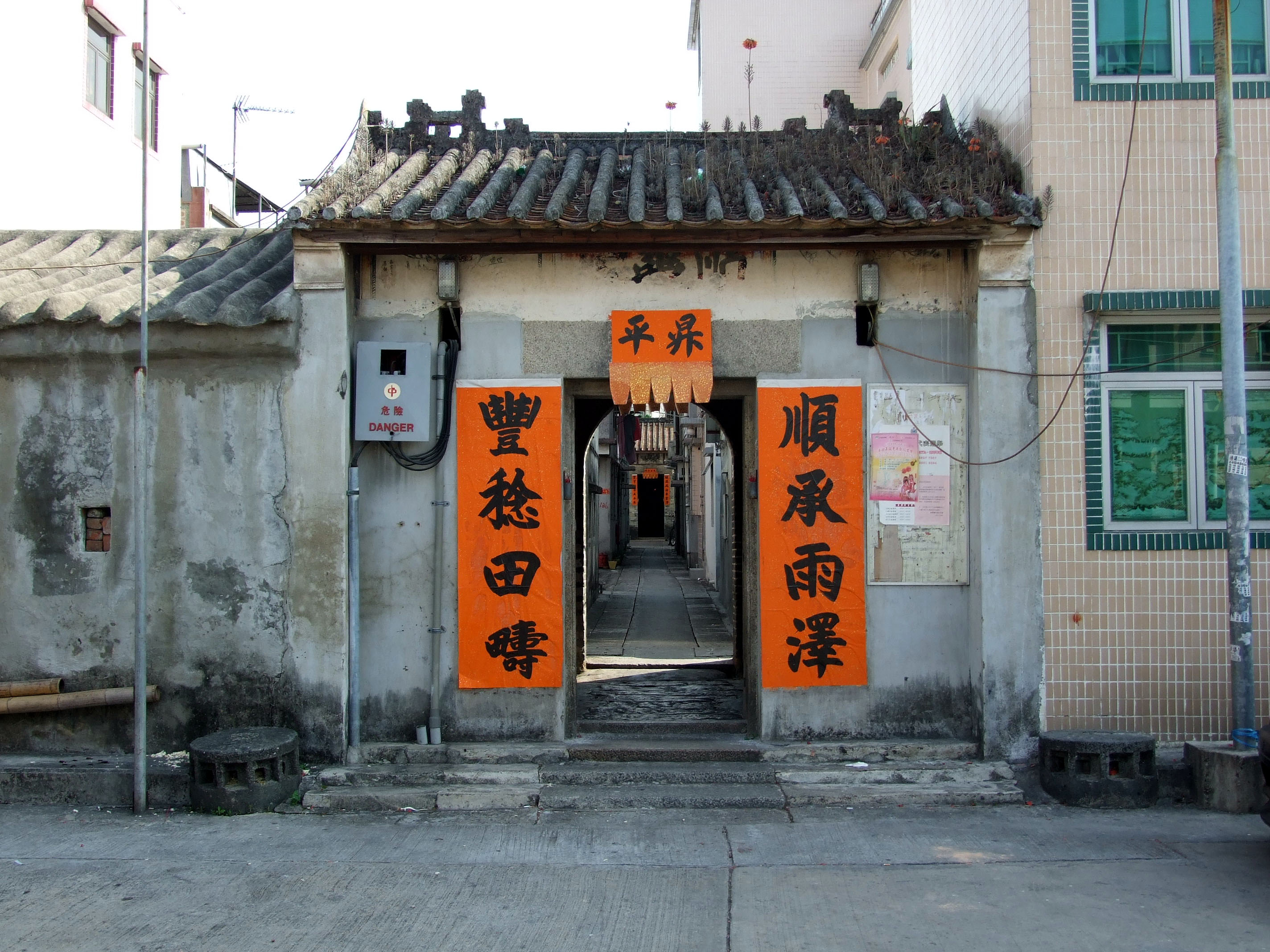
Entrance gate of Sun Fung Wai in 2011.

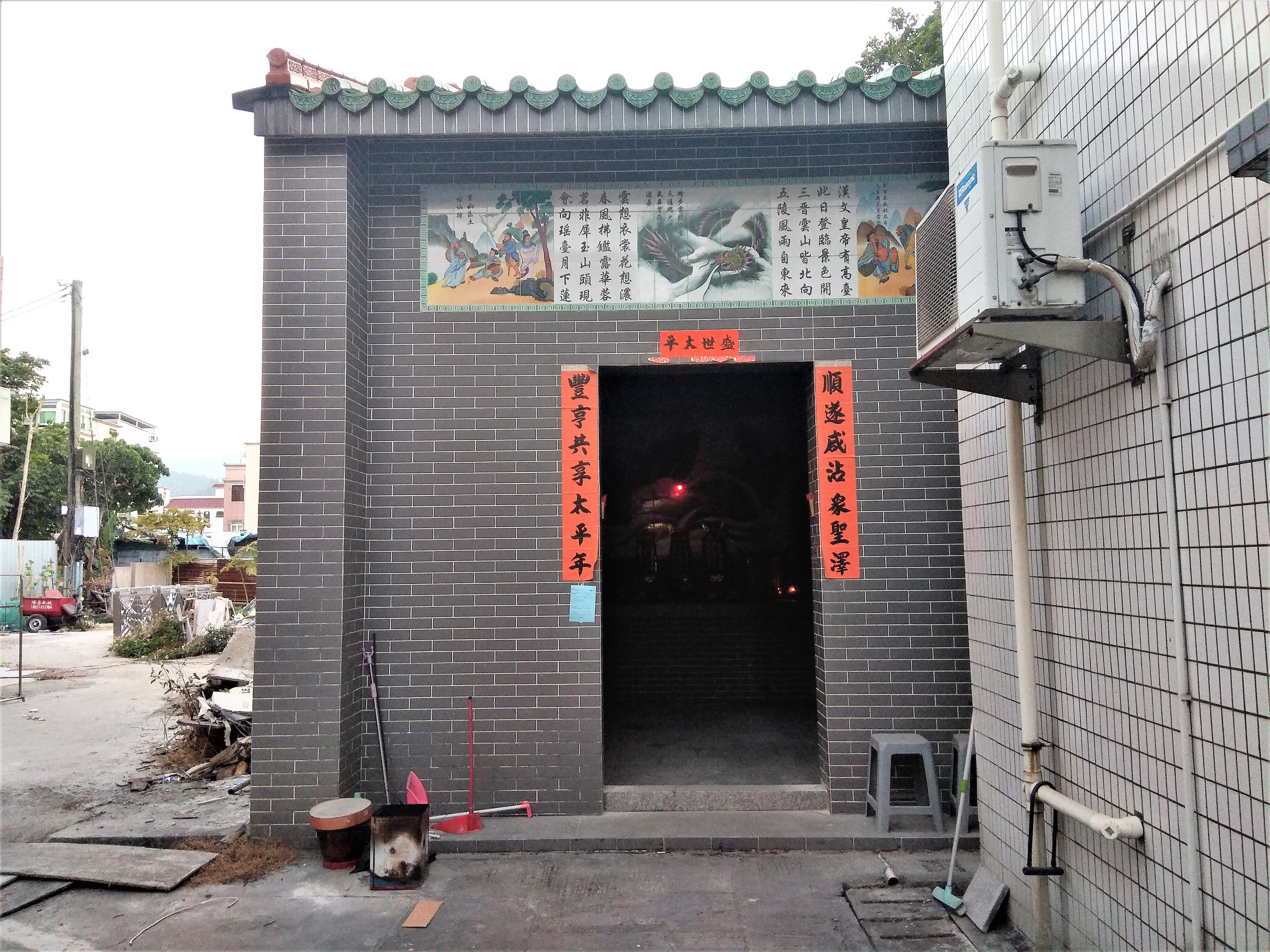
Village shrine in 2021.

Shun Fung Wai is a recognised village under the New Territories Small House Policy. Sun Fung Wai is one of the 36 villages represented within the Tuen Mun Rural Committee. For electoral purposes, Sun Fung Wai is part of the Tuen Mun Rural constituency.

== History ==
Sun Fung Wai is a multi-lineage village established around 300 years ago.

== See also ==
- Walled villages of Hong Kong, including nearby Nai Wai (adjacent), Tsing Chuen Wai and Tuen Tsz Wai
