= Yick Yuen Tsuen =

Coordinates: 22.428073°N 113.988823°E

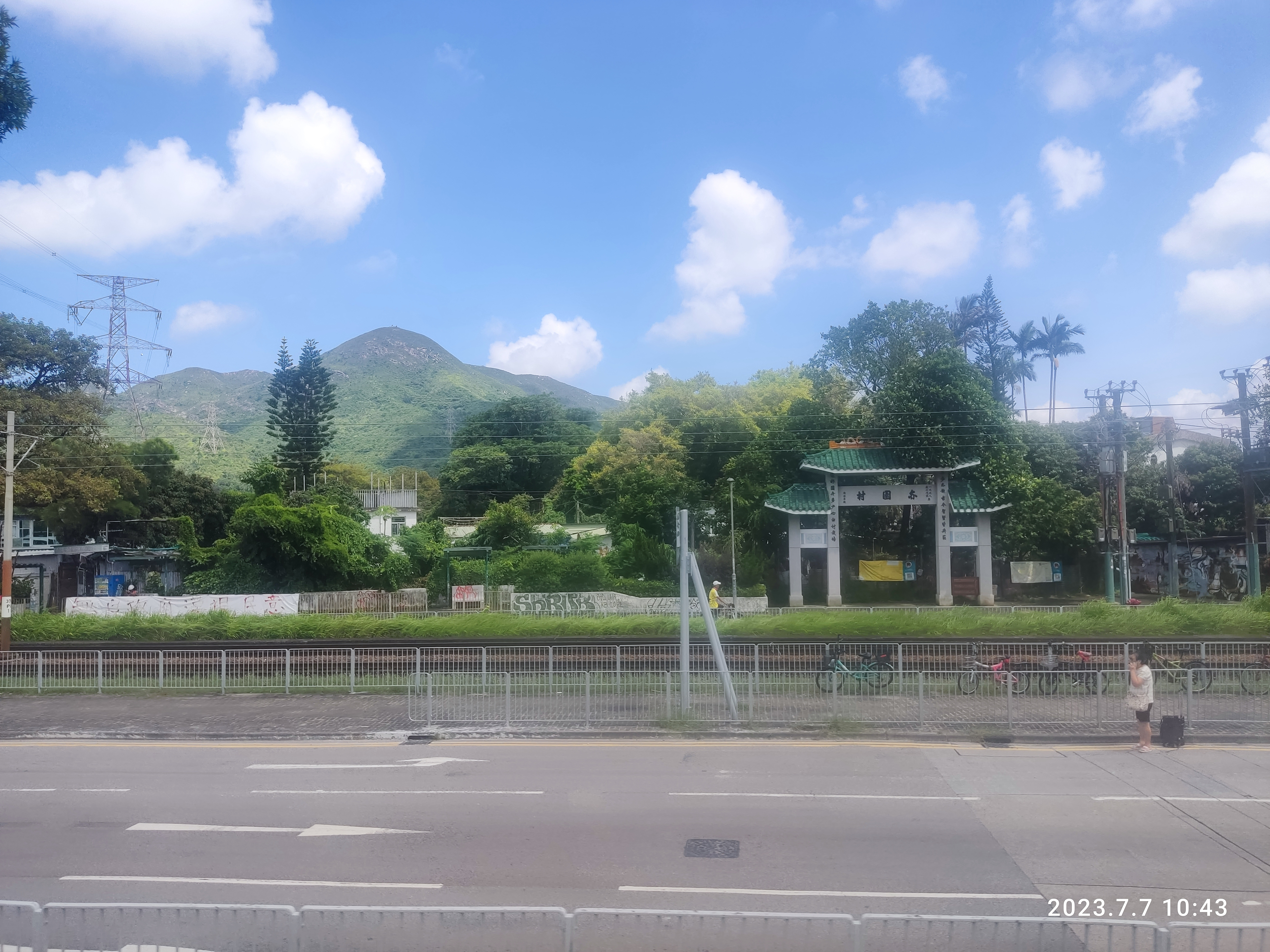
Paifang of Yick Yuen Tsuen along Castle Peak Road. Yuen Tau Shan is visible in the background.

Yick Yuen Tsuen (Chinese: 亦園村) is a village in Lam Tei, Tuen Mun District, Hong Kong.

== Administration ==
Yick Yuen Tsuen is one of the 36 villages represented within the Tuen Mun Rural Committee. For electoral purposes, Yick Yuen Tsuen is part of the Tuen Mun Rural constituency, which is currently represented by Kenneth Cheung Kam-hung.
