= Tou =

Tou or TOU may refer to:

- Tactical Operations Unit, a type of police unit
- Terms of use, rules which one must agree to abide by in order to use a service
- Time-of-use, time-based pricing often used by utility companies
- Touho Airport (IATA airport code), Touho, New Caledonia
- Tou (biblical figure)
- Tou (brewery), a former Norwegian brewery
- Tou (surname), a surname in Chinese and other cultures
- Tou (tree) (Cordia subcordata)
