= Tsing Chuen Wai =

Tsing Chuen Wai 青磚圍
- Walled village
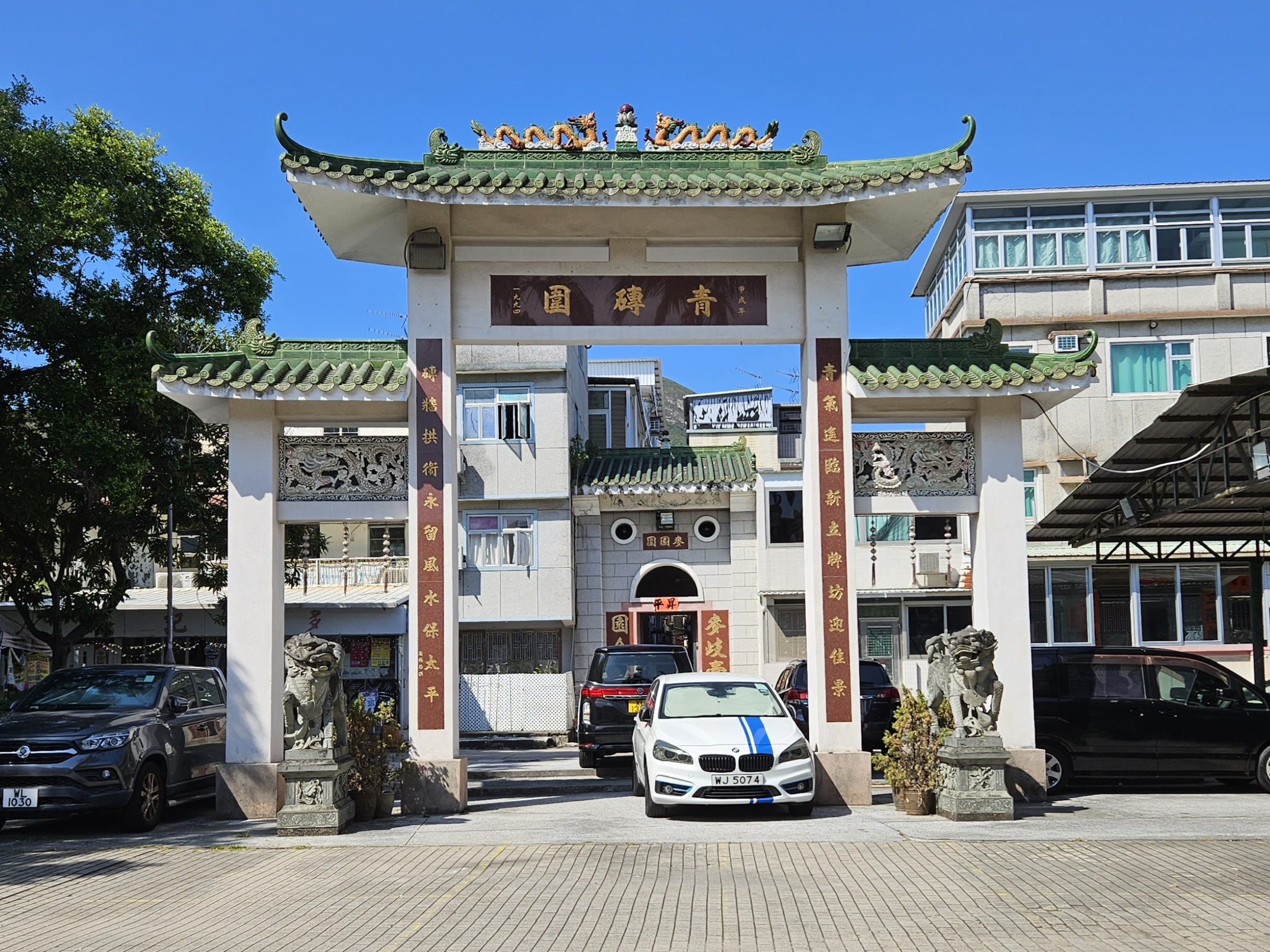
- Paifang of Tsing Chuen Wai

- Location in Hong Kong
- Coordinates: 22.422688°N 113.982343°E
- District: Tuen Mun District
- Special administrative region: Hong Kong
- Country: People's Republic of China
- Established: About 300 years ago
- Time zone: UTC+8 (Hong Kong Time)

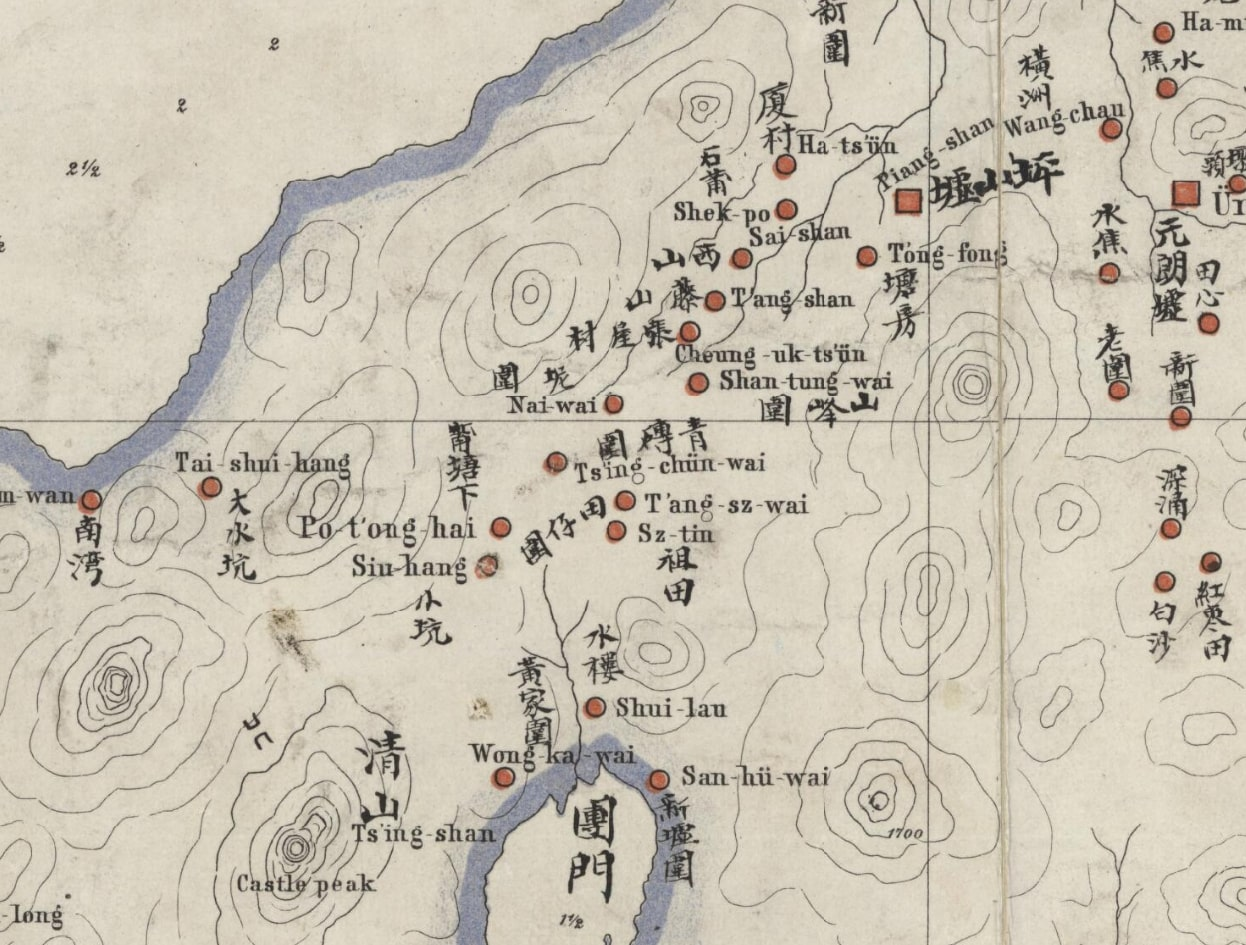
Tsing Chuen Wai on the "Map of the San-On District" by Simeone Volonteri (1866).

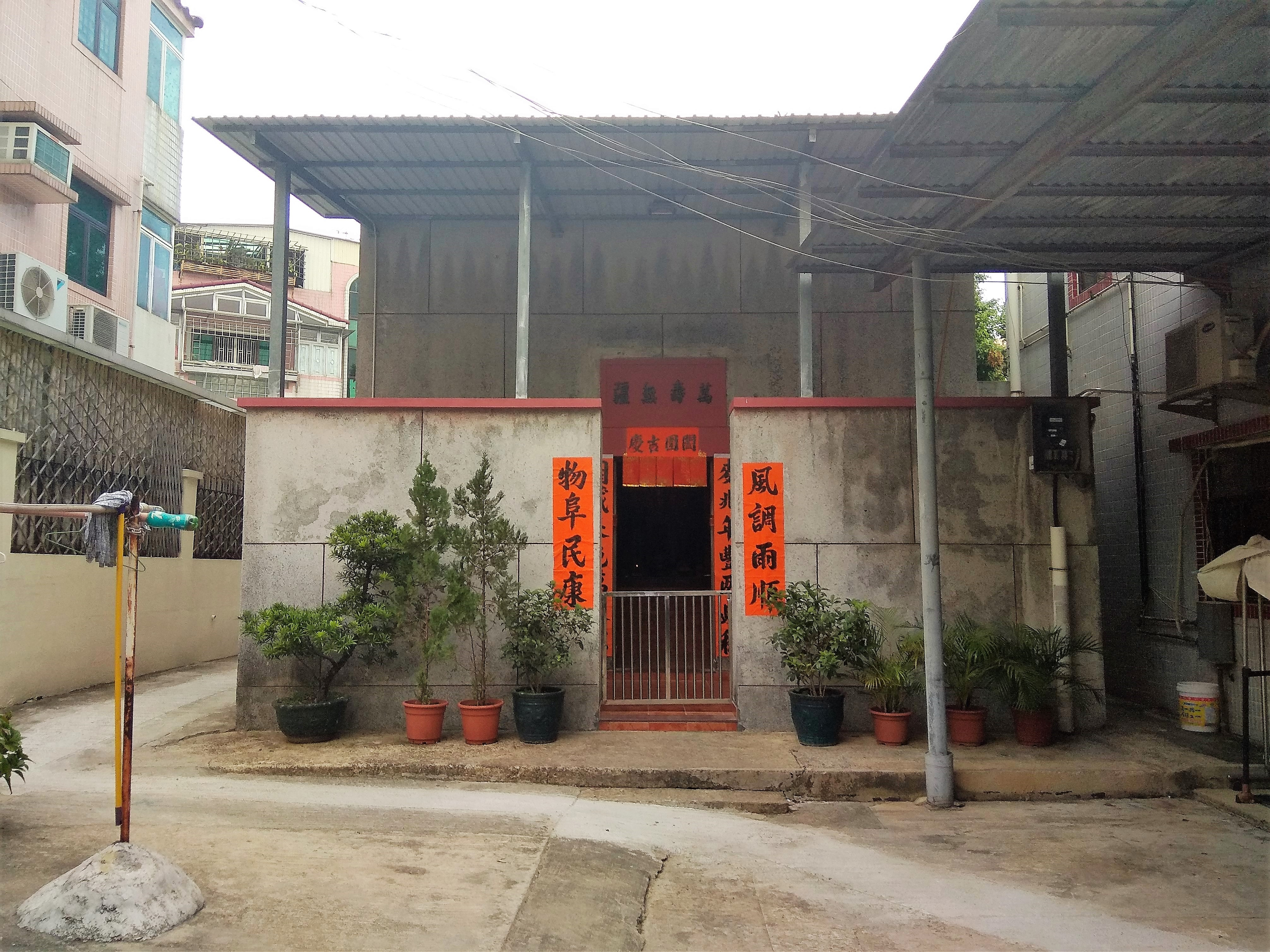
Village shrine.

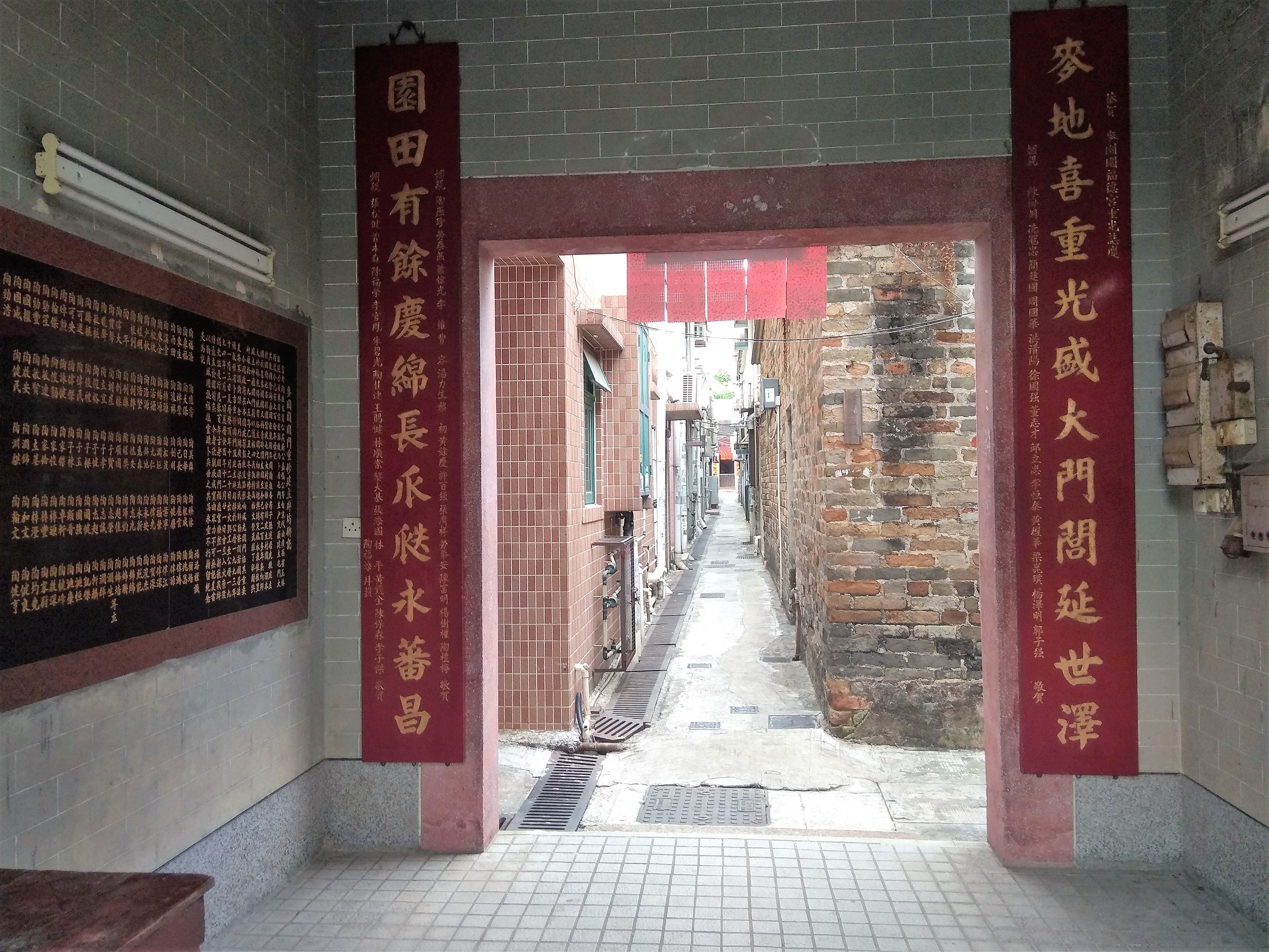
Central axis viewed from the entrance gate.

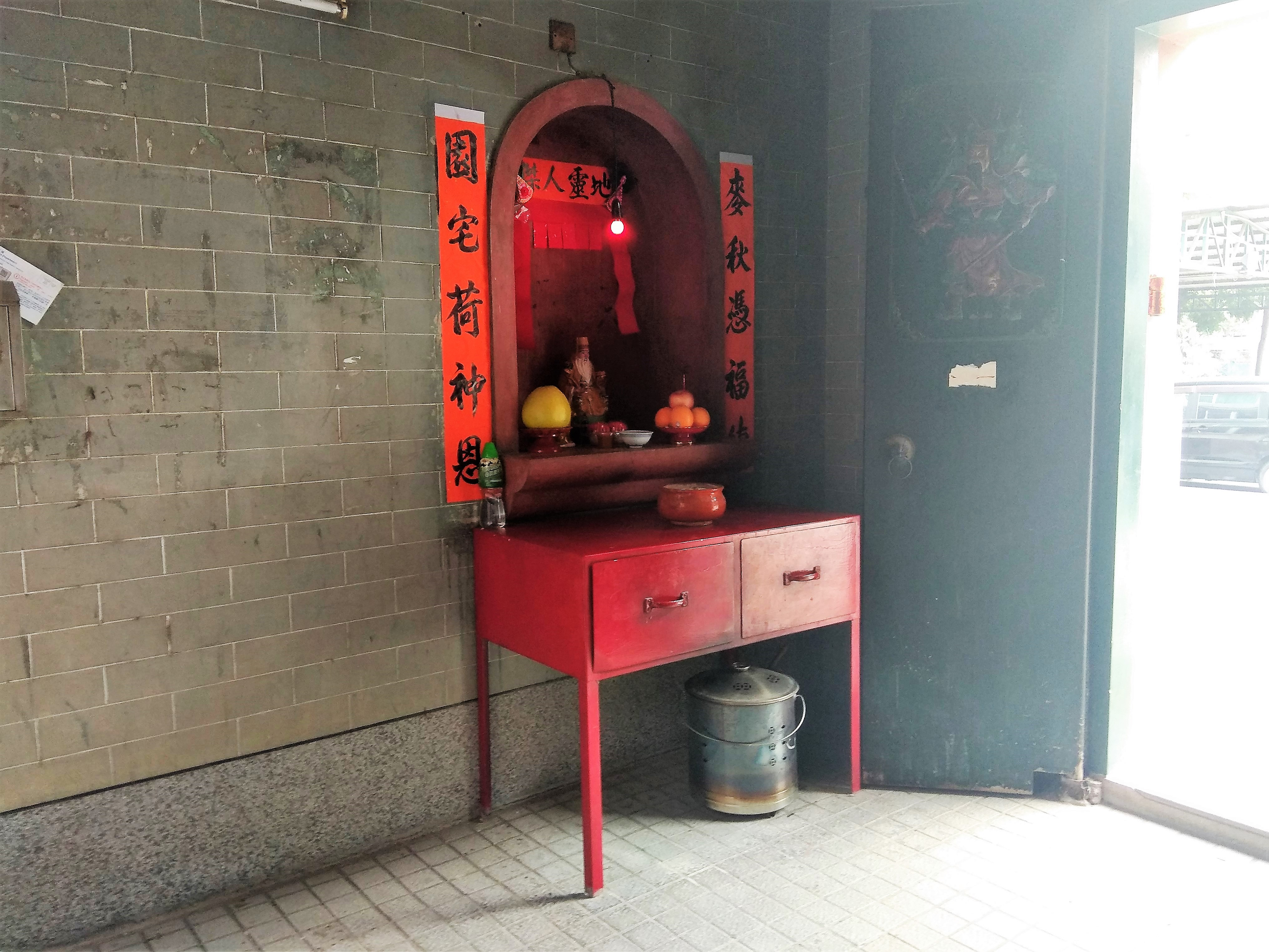
Shrine inside the entrance gate.

Tsing Chuen Wai (Chinese: 青磚圍; lit. 'green bricks walled village') is a walled village located in the Lam Tei area, in the northern part of Tuen Mun District, in Hong Kong.

== Recognised status ==
Tsing Chuen Wai is a recognised village under the Small House Policy of the New Territories. It is one of the 36 villages represented within the Tuen Mun Rural Committee. For electoral purposes, Tsing Chuen Wai is part of the Tuen Mun Rural constituency, which as of 2021 was represented by Kenneth Cheung Kam-hung.

== History ==
Several villages of the Lam Tei area were established by the To (陶) Clan. Originally from Poyang, Jiangxi (other sources mention Watlam in Guangxi), the To Clan moved to Ngau Tam Mei and then to Tuen Mun Tai Tsuen. Following the increase of the clan population, the village dispersed and developed into five villages in the Lam Tei area: Nai Wai, Tsing Chuen Wai, Tuen Tsz Wai, Lam Tei Tsuen and Tuen Mun San Tsuen, which were all fortified.

Tsing Chuen Wai, formerly known as Mak Yuen Wai (麥園圍; 'Walled Village of Barley Farm'), was established by the To (陶) Clan about 300 years ago. Its present name came from the fact that the village was surrounded by its protective walls made of green bricks. The Tos had conflicts with the Tang Clan of Ping Shan during the Qing Dynasty, and attacks were carried out against the walled village. Watchmen at the watchtowers were killed but Tsing Chuen Wai was never captured by the Tangs. The enclosing walls and watchtowers were torn down in the 1960s.

Tsing Chuen Wai appears on the "Map of the San-On District", published in 1866 by Simeone Volonteri.

== Features ==
The only surviving portion of the original green-brick boundary wall at the main entrance of the Wai gives visitors an insight into the walled village's historical outlook. Tin Hau, Kwan Tai and a Qing official are worshipped in the village shrine.

== See also ==
- Walled villages of Hong Kong
- Tuen Tsz Wai, another walled village established by the To Clan, located next to Tsing Chuen Wai
