= Nai Wai =

Walled village in Hong Kong

Coordinates: 22.423307°N 113.988609°E

Nai Wai Chinese: 泥圍
- Village
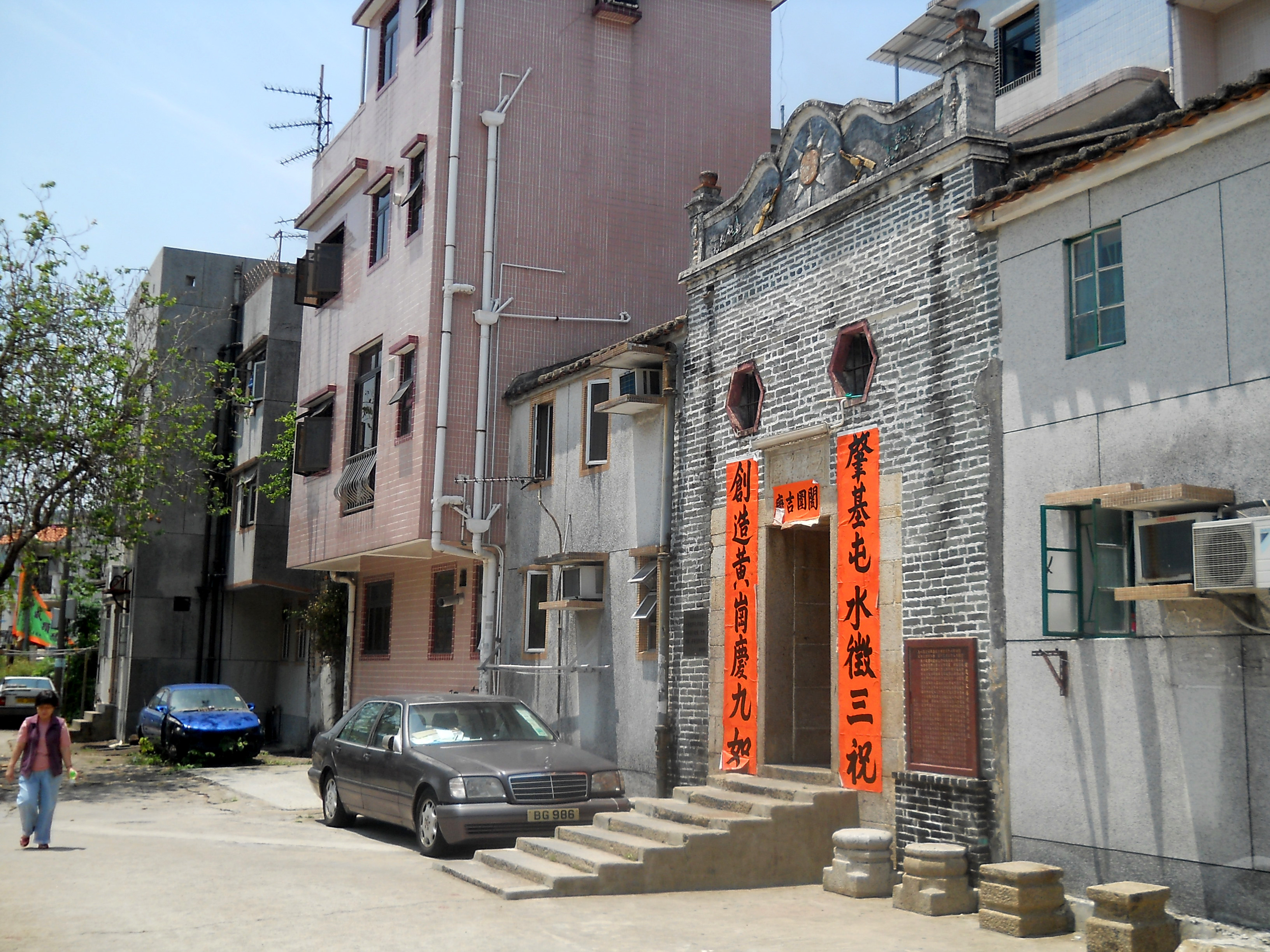
- Entrance gate of Nai Wai

- Location within Hong Kong
- Area/neighbourhood: Lam Tei
- District: Tuen Mun District
- Statutorily-defined area: New Territories
- Special administrative region: Hong Kong
- Country: People's Republic of China
- Founder: To (陶) Clan
- Time zone: UTC+8:00 (HKT)

Nai Wai (Chinese: 泥圍) aka. Wong Kong Wai (黃崗圍) is a walled village in Lam Tei, Tuen Mun District, Hong Kong.

== Recognised status ==
Nai Wai is a recognised village under the New Territories Small House Policy. It is one of the 36 villages represented within the Tuen Mun Rural Committee. For electoral purposes, Nai Wai is part of the Tuen Mun Rural constituency, which is currently represented by Kenneth Cheung Kam-hung.

== History ==
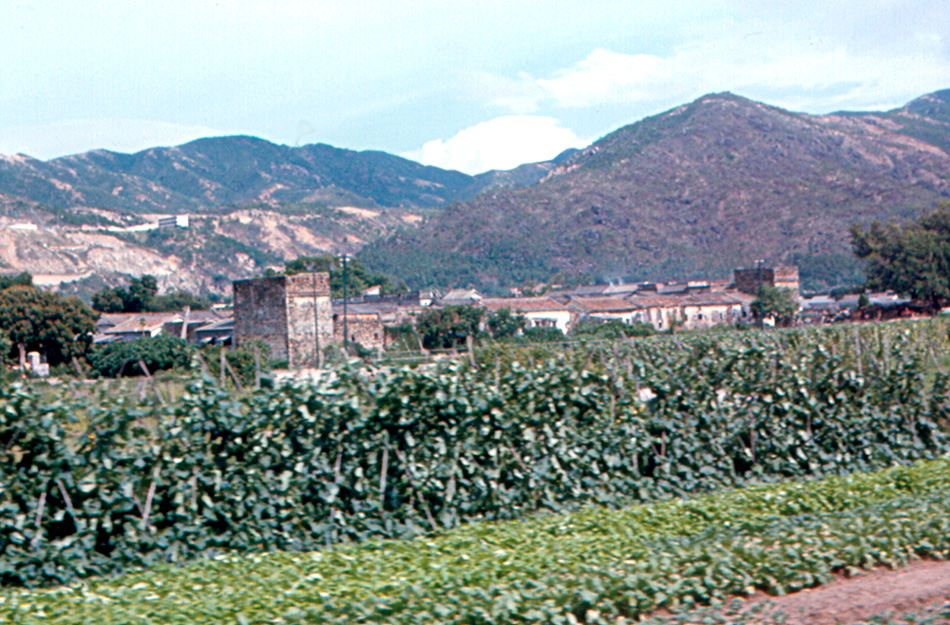
View of Nai Wai in the 1960s.

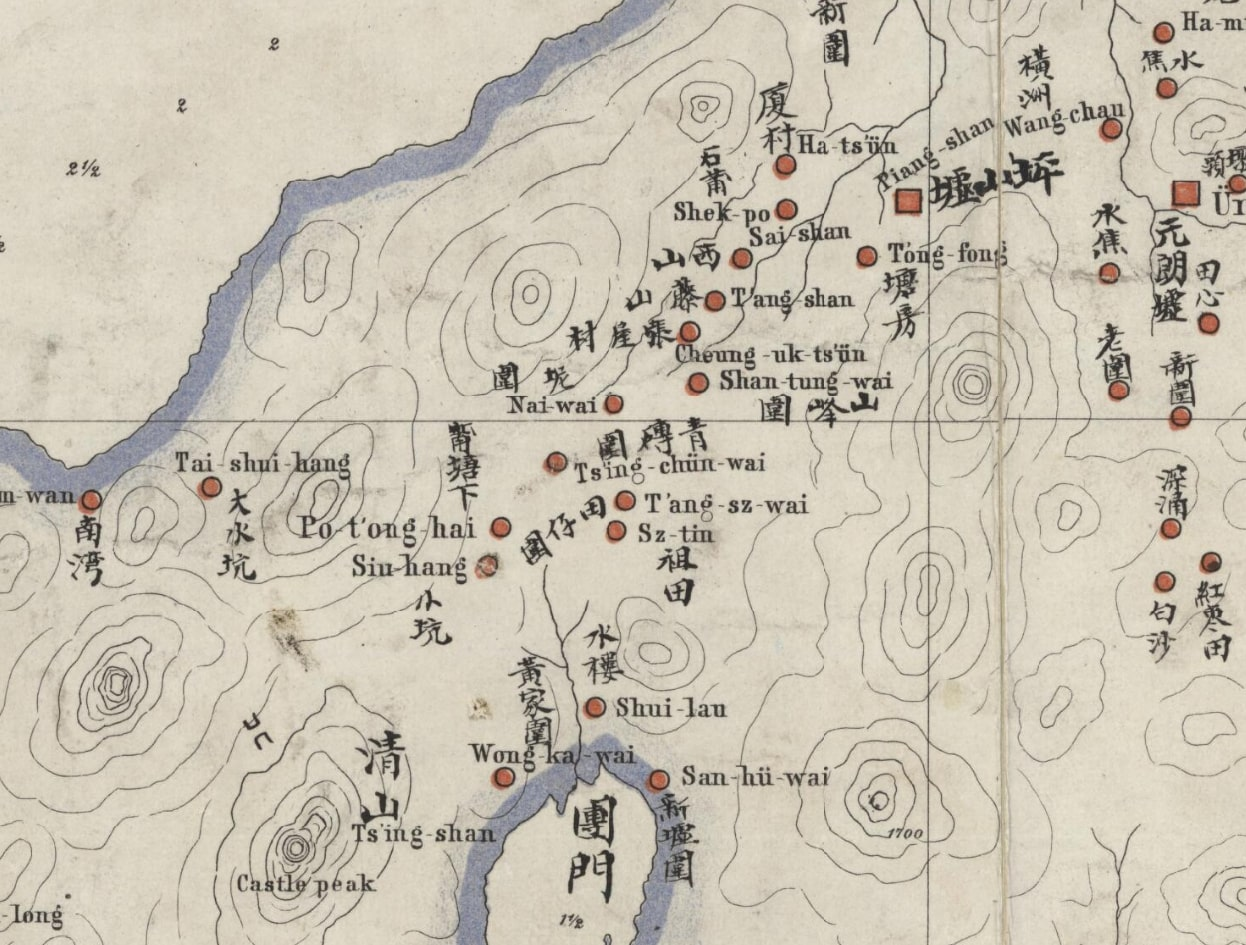
Nai Wai on the "Map of the San-On District" by Simeone Volonteri (1866).

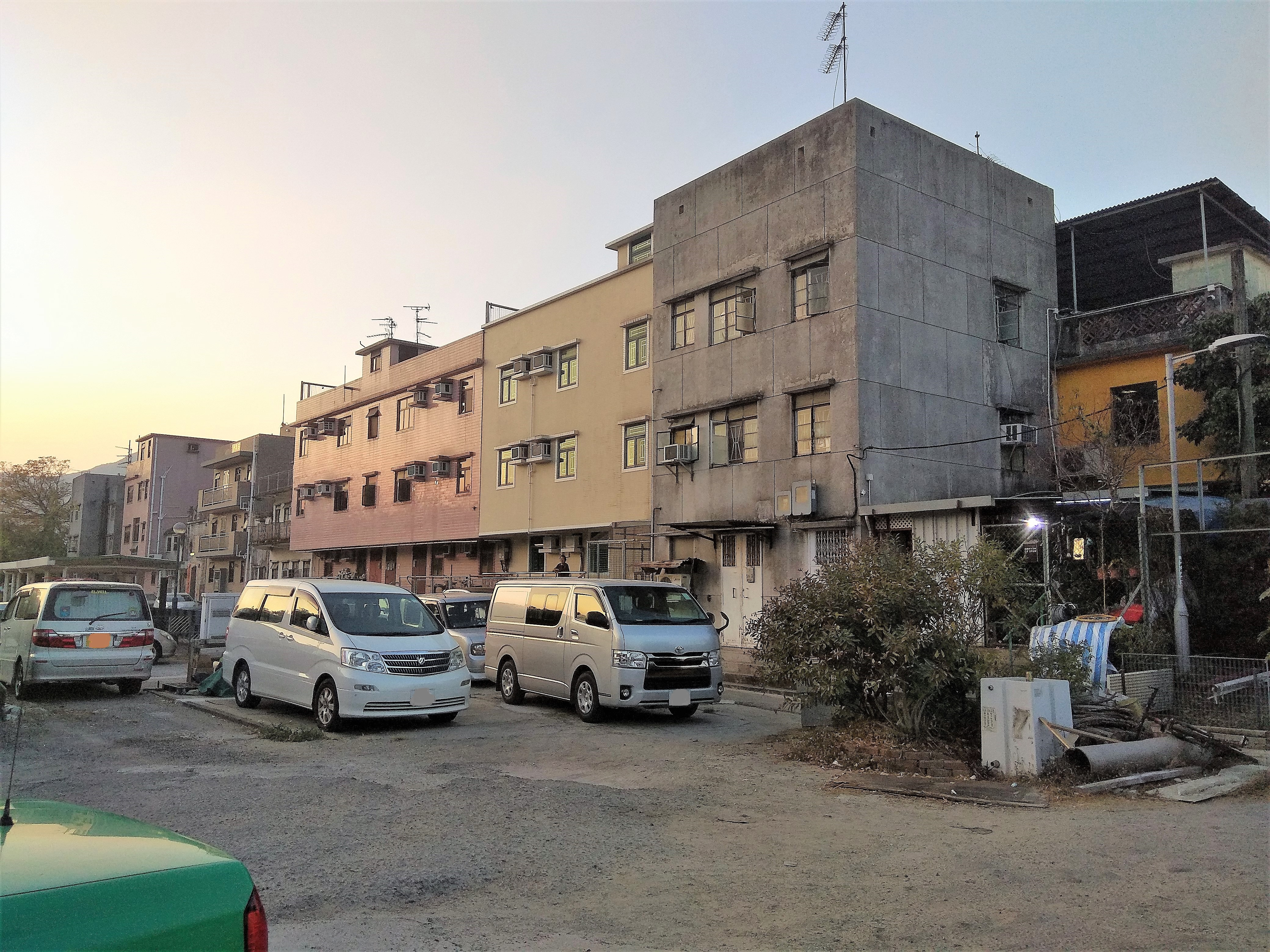
Nai Wai.

Nai Wai was established by the To (陶) Clan.

Several villages of the Lam Tei area were established by the To (陶) Clan. Originally from Poyang, Jiangxi (other sources mention Watlam in Guangxi), the To Clan moved to Ngau Tam Mei and then to Tuen Mun Tai Tsuen. Following the increase of the clan population, the village dispersed and developed into five villages in the Lam Tei area: Nai Wai, Tsing Chuen Wai, Tuen Tsz Wai, Lam Tei Tsuen and Tuen Mun San Tsuen, which were all fortified.

According to different sources, Nai Wai may have been established around 1368-1398 or during the reign of Qianlong Emperor (1735-1796).

Nai Wai appears on the "Map of the San-On District", published in 1866 by Simeone Volonteri.

== Features ==
Nai Wai was a walled village with four watch towers at the four corners of the square village. The entrance gate was moved to the present southern outer row of houses with its entrance facing south about 200 years ago due to feng shui reasons.

== See also ==
- Walled villages of Hong Kong, including nearby Sun Fung Wai (adjacent), Tsing Chuen Wai and Tuen Tsz Wai
- Nai Wai stop
- Tuen Mun River
