= Tuen Mun San Tsuen =

Walled village in Hong Kong

Coordinates: 22.418177°N 113.983588°E

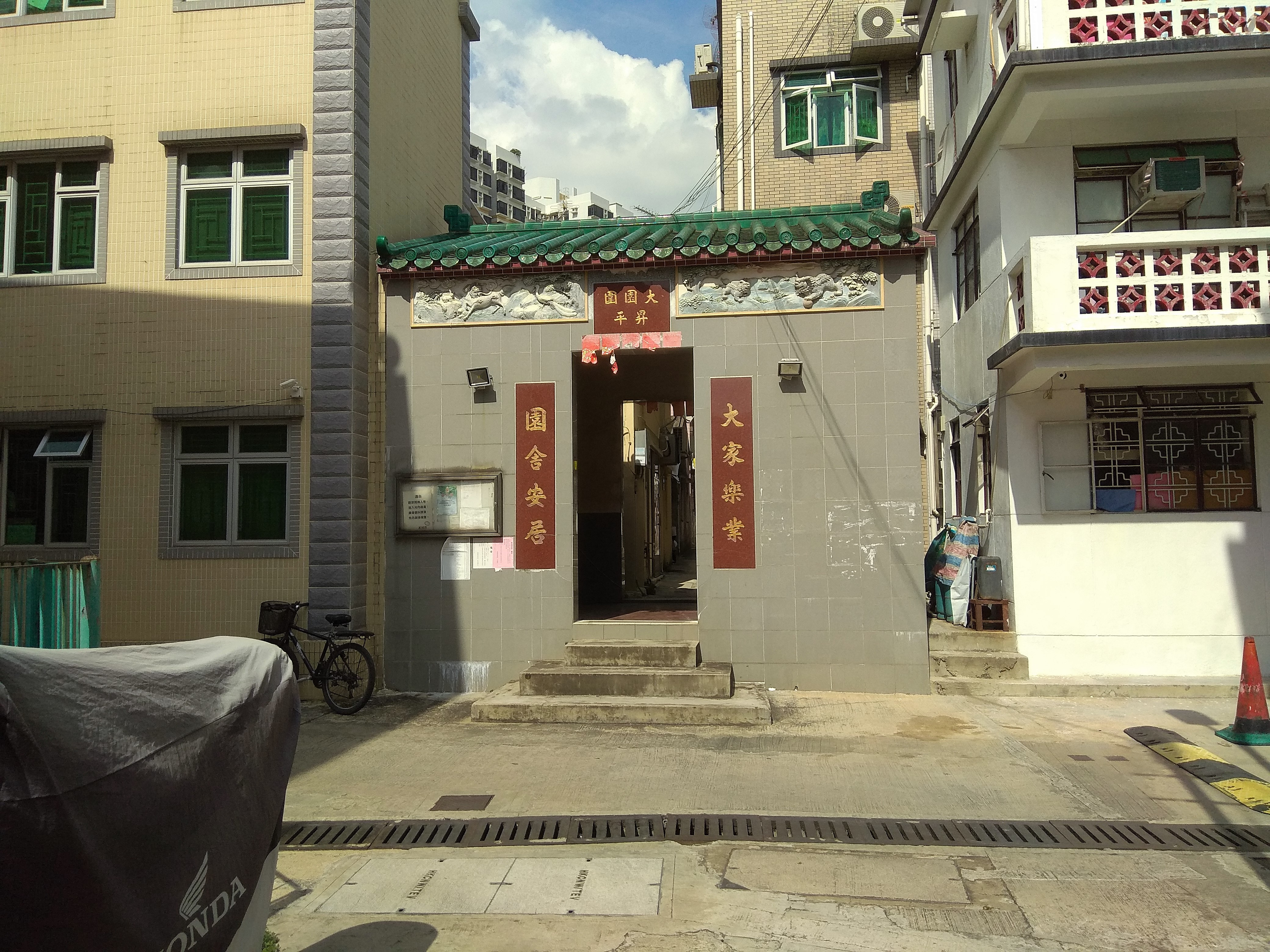
Entrance gate of Tai Yuen Wai. The name (圍園大) ('Tai Yuen Wai' from right to left) is written on the lintel.

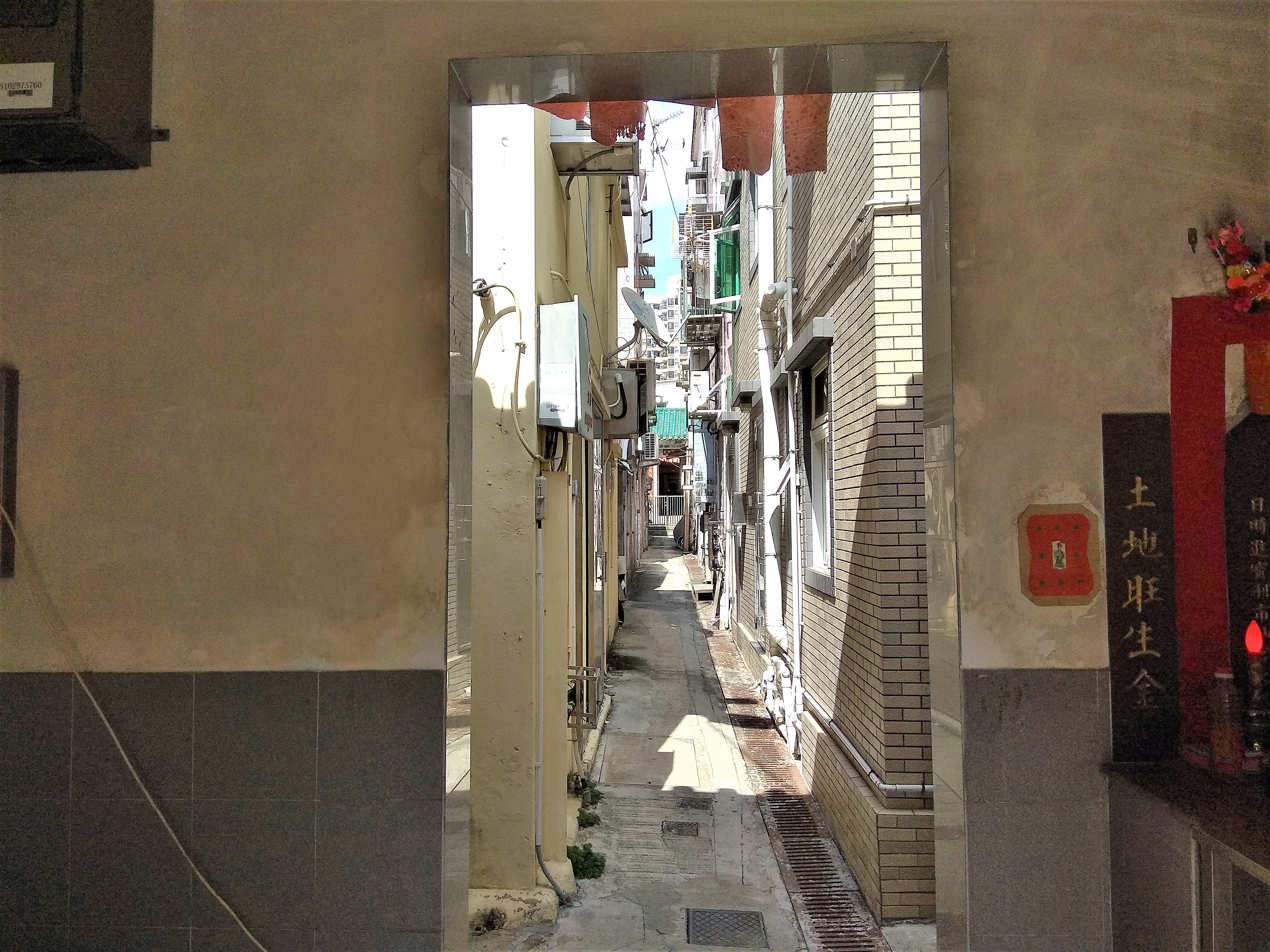
Central axis of Tai Yuen Wai, viewed from the entrance gate.

Tuen Mun San Tsuen (Chinese: 屯門新村) is a walled village in Lam Tei, Tuen Mun District, Hong Kong. The walled village is also called San Tsuen Wai (新村圍) or Tai Yuen Wai (大園圍).

== Administration ==
Tuen Mun San Tsuen is one of the 36 villages represented within the Tuen Mun Rural Committee.

== History ==
Several villages of the Lam Tei area were established by the To (陶) Clan. Originally from Poyang, Jiangxi (other sources mention Watlam in Guangxi), the To Clan moved to Ngau Tam Mei and then to Tuen Mun Tai Tsuen. Following the increase of the clan population, the village dispersed and developed into five villages in the Lam Tei area: Nai Wai, Tsing Chuen Wai, Tuen Tsz Wai, Lam Tei Tsuen and Tuen Mun San Tsuen, which were all fortified.

== See also ==
- Walled villages of Hong Kong
