= Tuen Tsz Wai =

Village of Hong Kong

Coordinates: 22.421740°N 113.981272°E

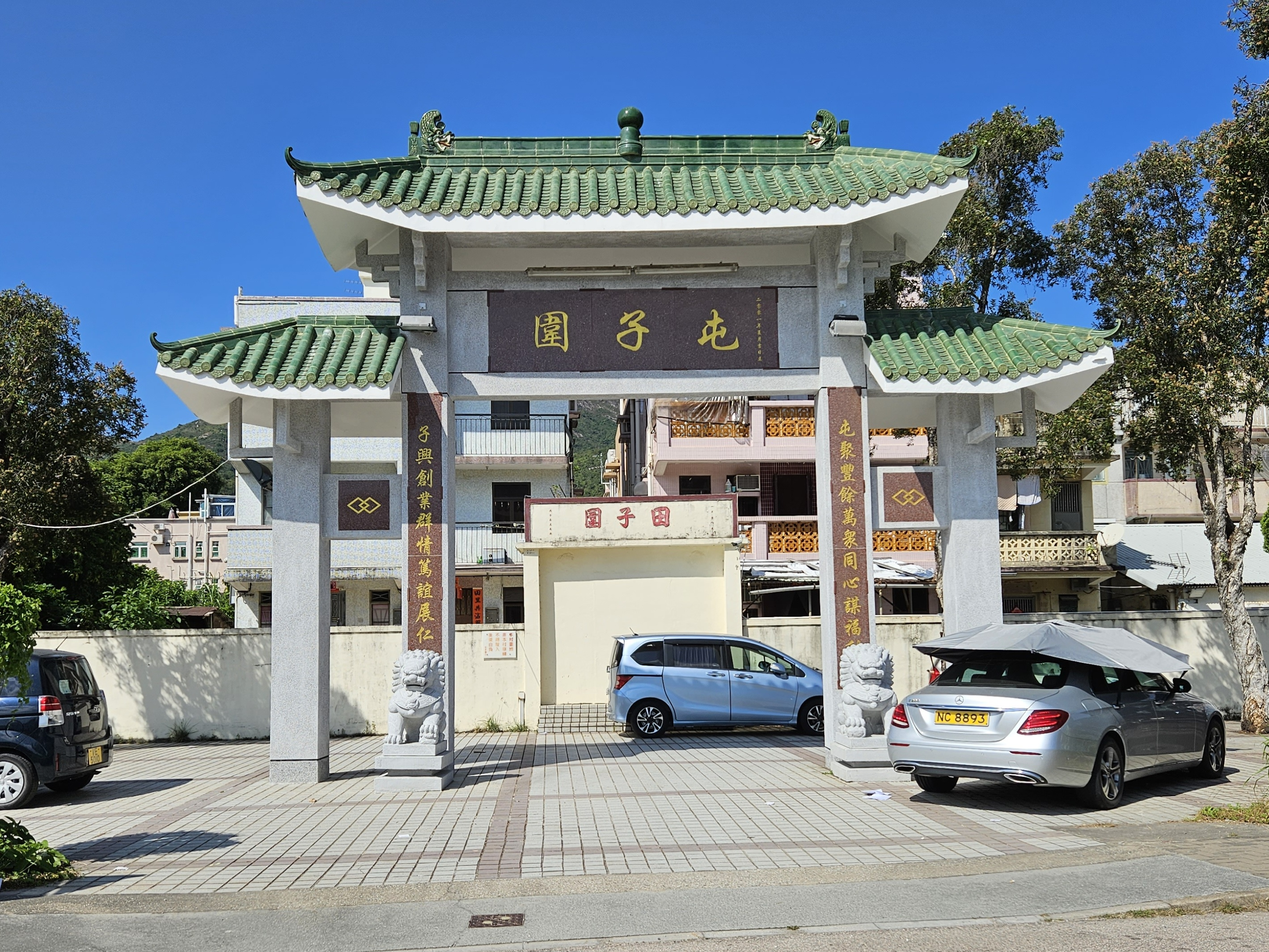
Paifang of Tuen Tsz Wai and former entrance gate of the walled village. The permanently closed gate features the old name of the village "Tin Tsz Wai" (田子圍)

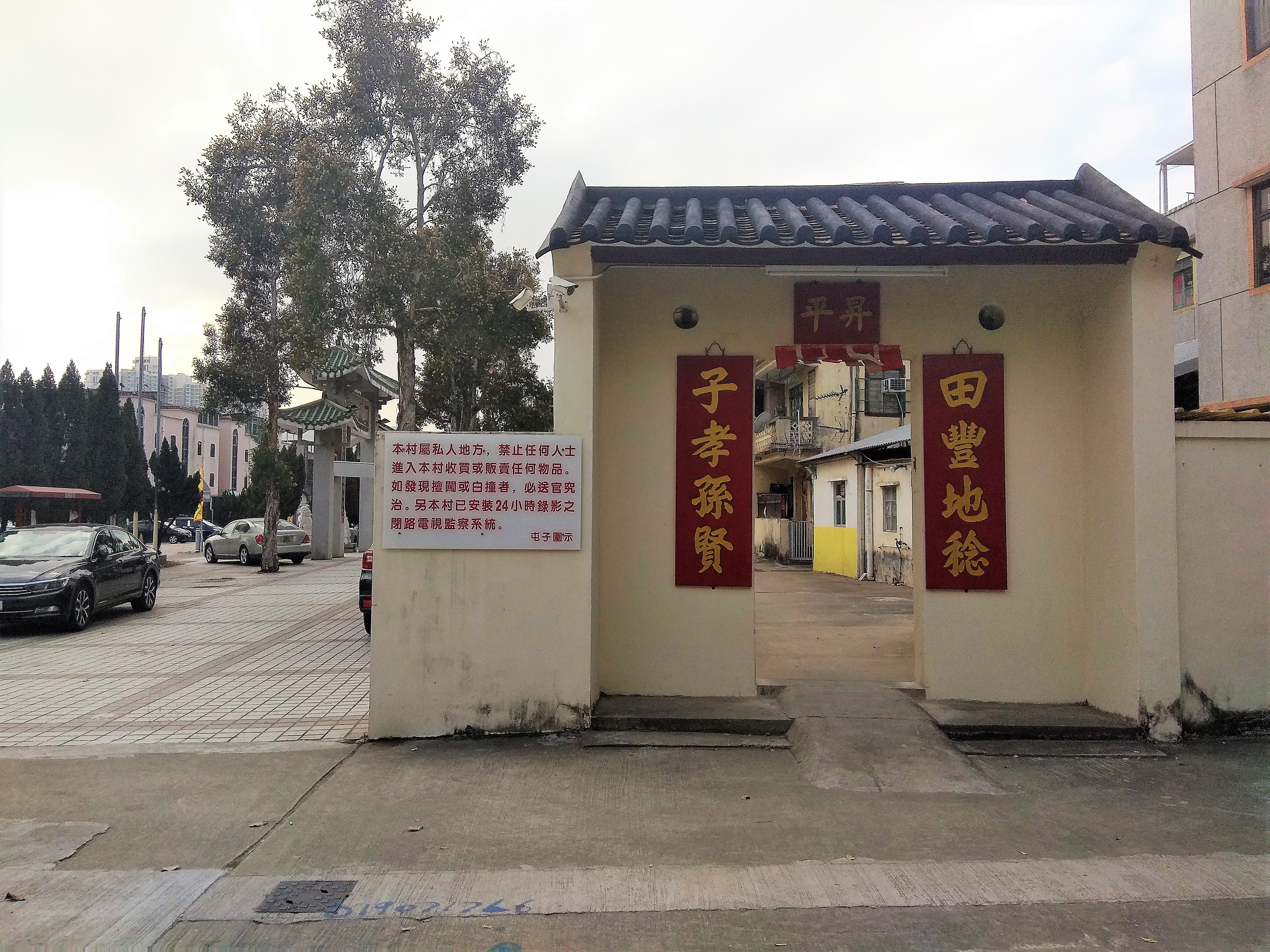
New entrance gate. Ng Lau Road (五柳路) is on the left, the walled village is on the right.

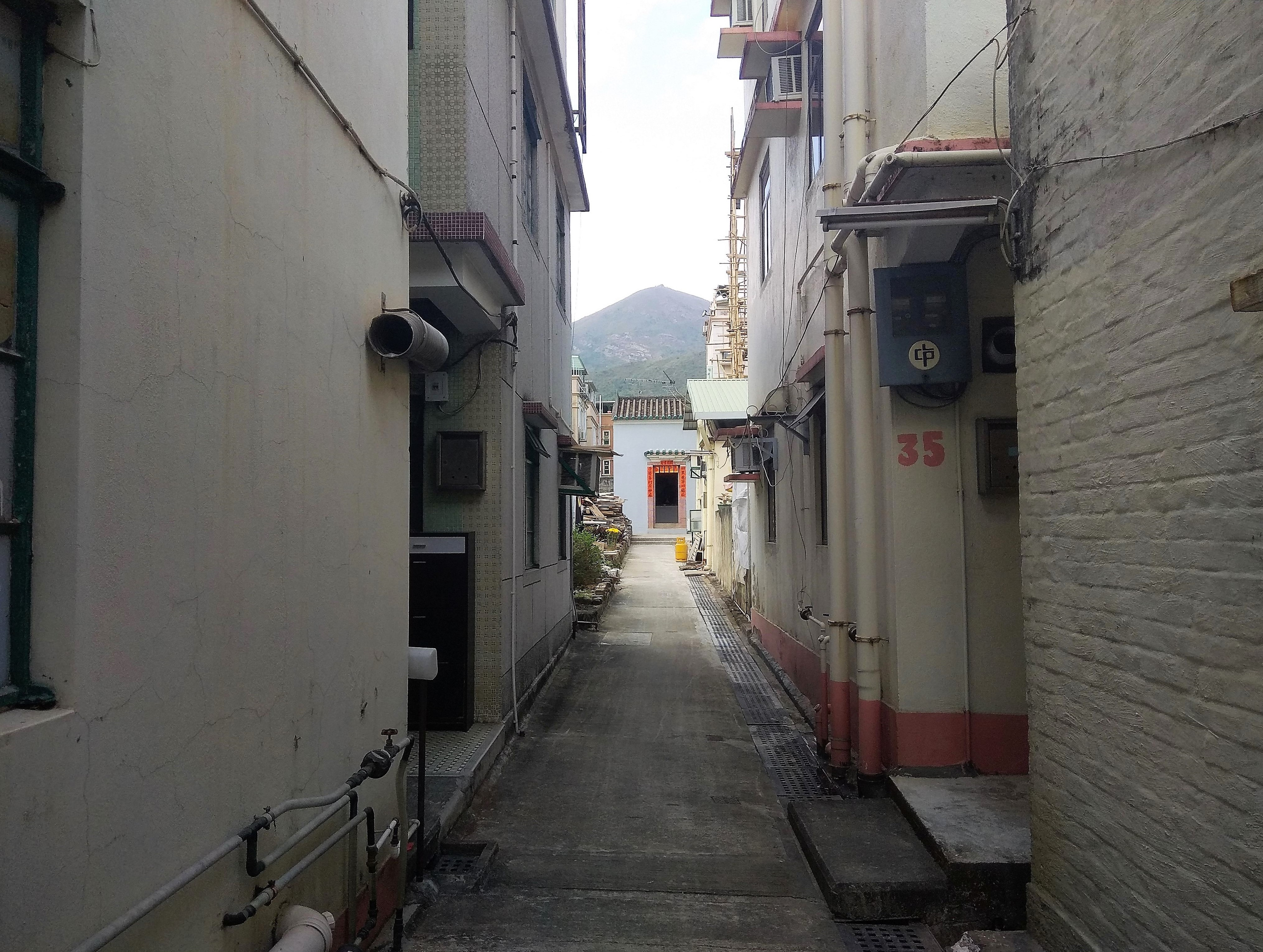
Central axis of the walled village with the village shrine at its end. The hill in the background in Yuen Tau Shan.

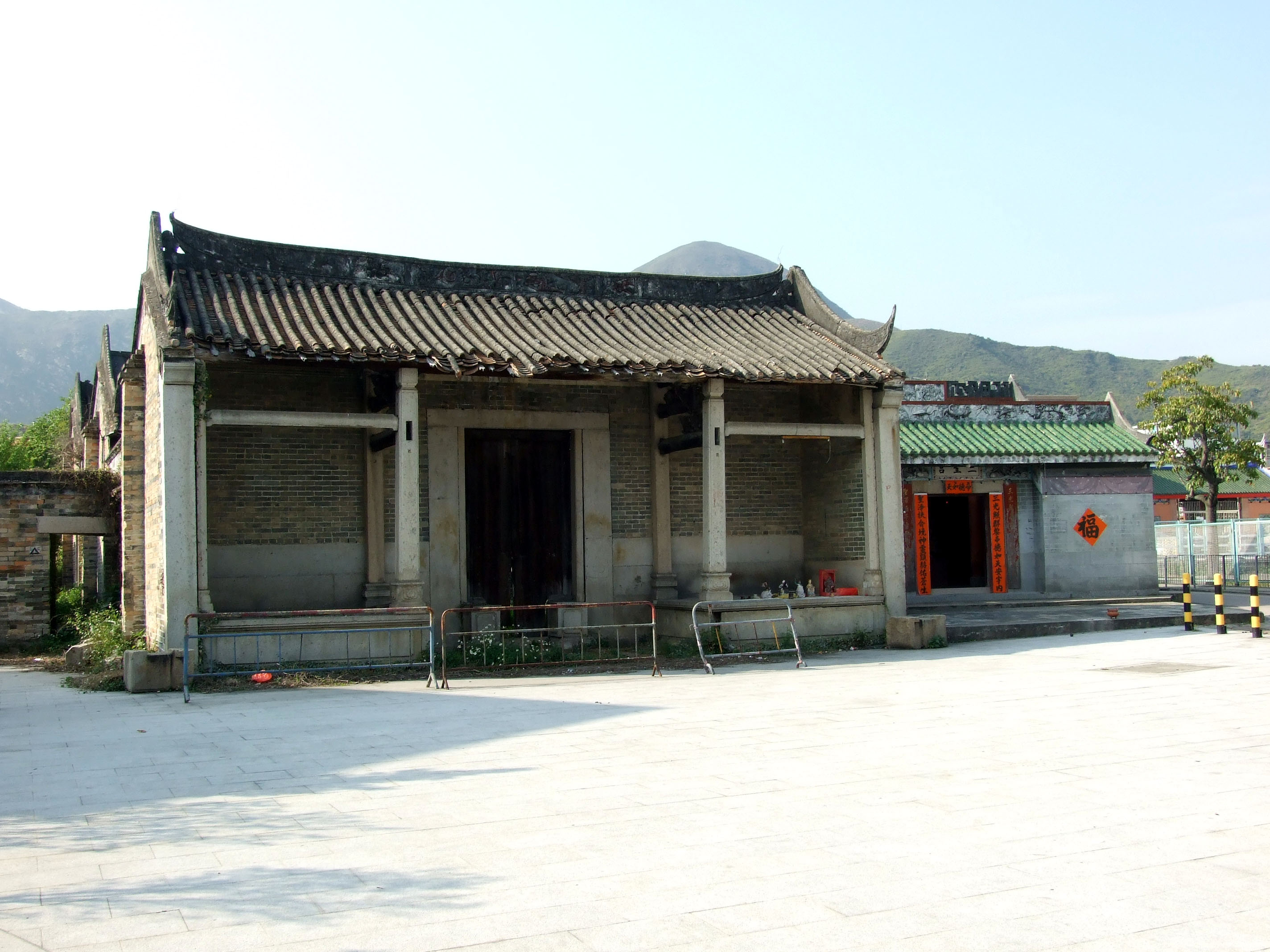
Oldest To Ancestral Hall (left) and Sam Shing Temple (right)

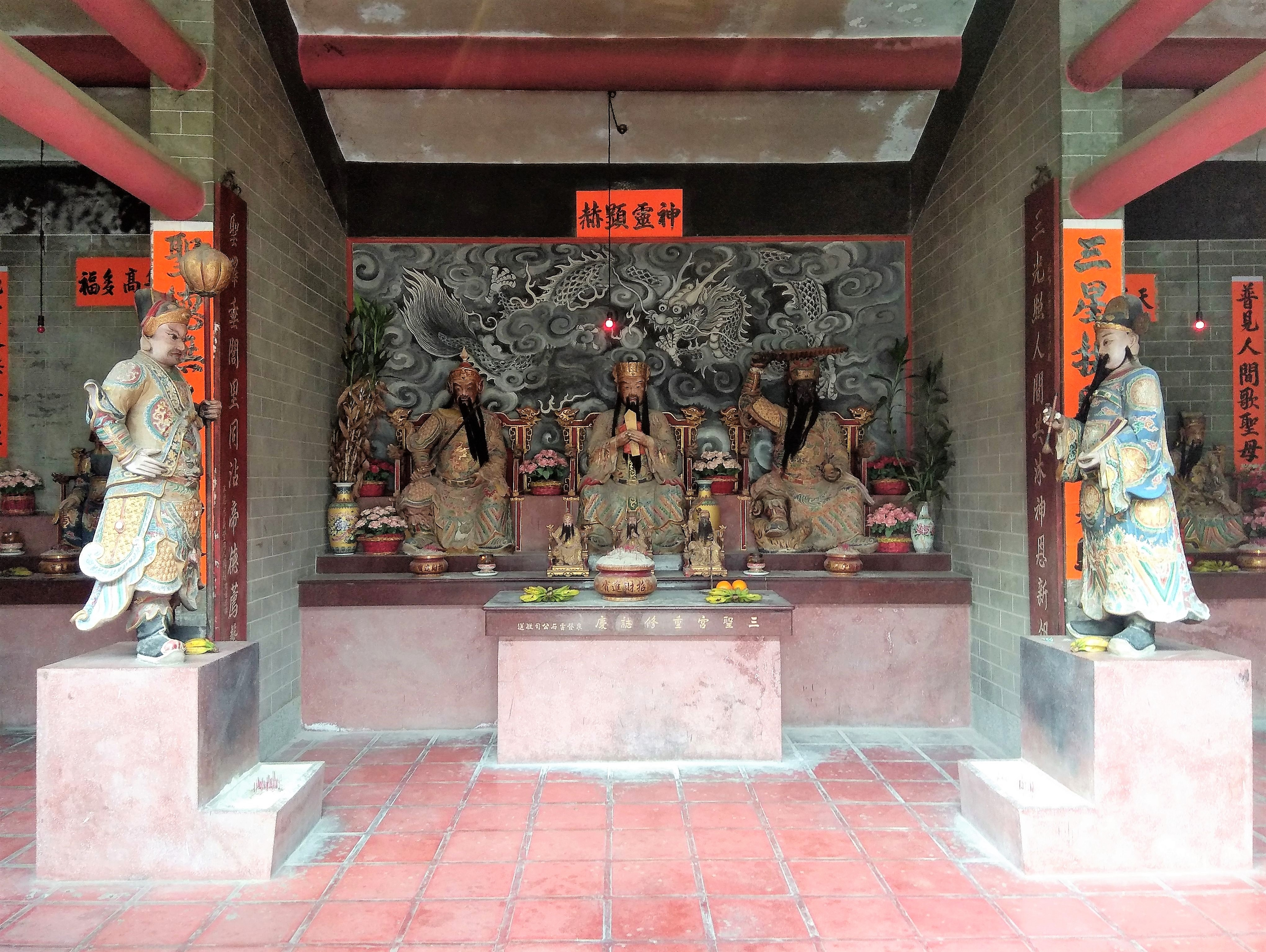
Main altar of Sam Shing Temple, with the statues of Hau Wong (left), Hung Shing (middle), Marshal Yuen Tan Fuk Fu (right). The two guardian statues in the foreground are the Guardian God of War (left) and the Guardian God of Literature (right).

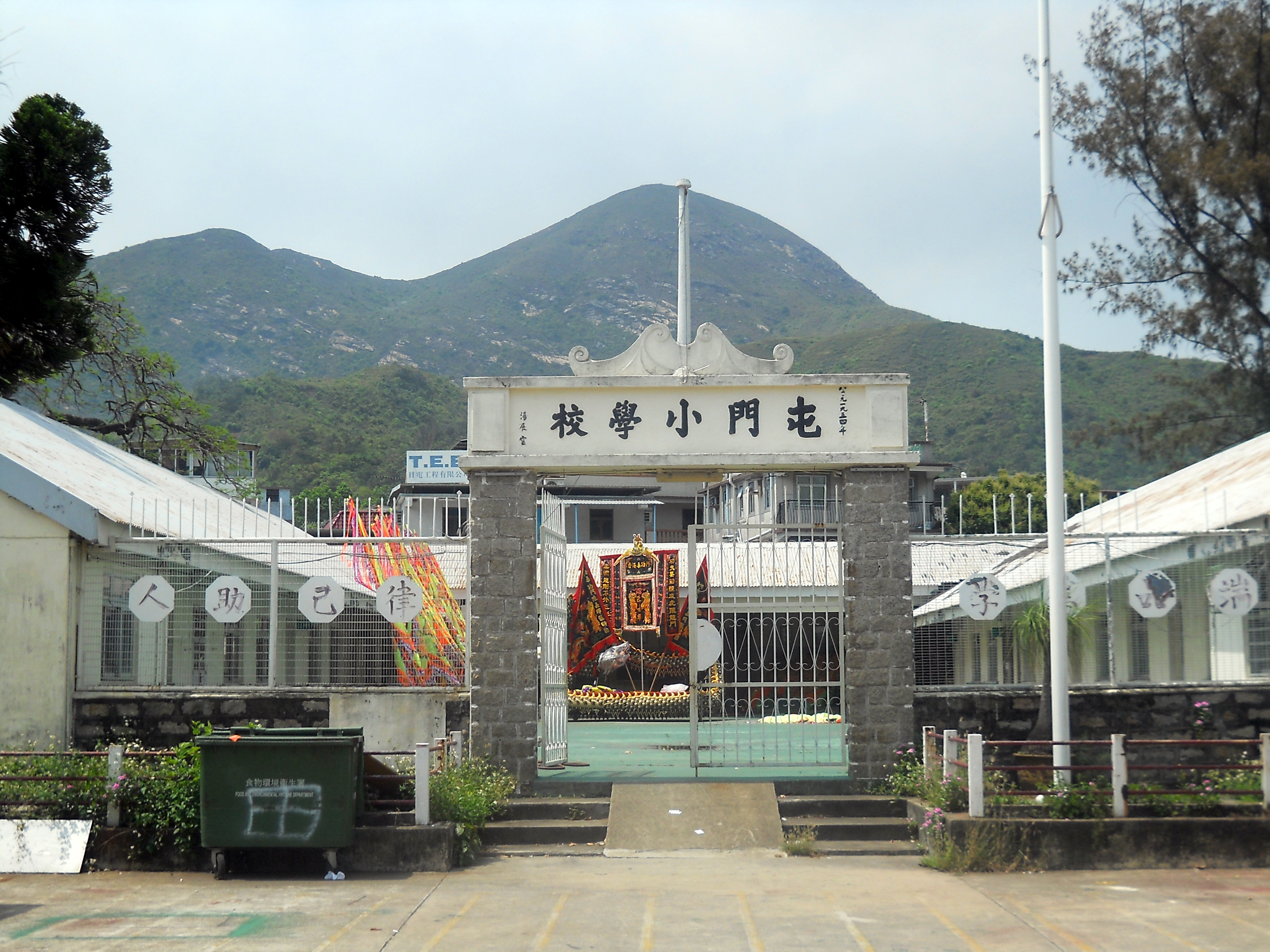
Tuen Mun Primary School (屯門小學校) in Tuen Tsz Wai. The hill in the background is Yuen Tau Shan.

Tuen Tsz Wai (Chinese: 屯子圍) is a village of Hong Kong, located in the Lam Tei area, in the northern part of Tuen Mun District. Part of the village is a historic Punti walled village.

== Administration ==
Tuen Tsz Wai is a recognized village under the New Territories Small House Policy. It is one of the 36 villages represented within the Tuen Mun Rural Committee. For electoral purposes, Tuen Tsz Wai is part of the Tuen Mun Rural constituency.

== History ==
The village was built by the Siu (蕭) Clan. It was later settled by the To (陶) Clan, after the Siu moved to other places. Originally from Poyang, Jiangxi (other sources mention Watlam in Guangxi), the To Clan moved to Ngau Tam Mei and then to Tuen Mun Tai Tsuen, which they built as their family estate during the Ming Dynasty. Following the increase of the clan population, the To Clan dispersed and developed into five villages in the Lam Tei area during the Qing Dynasty: Nai Wai (泥圍), Tsing Chuen Wai, Tuen Tsz Wai, Lam Tei Tsuen (藍地村) and Tuen Mun San Tsuen (屯門新村), which were all fortified.

== Walled village ==
The wall of Tuen Tsz Wai was rebuilt in 1978. The entrance gate of the walled village, originally at the southern end of the central axis, was demolished and a new one was built further east, at the location of a former watchtower. A new permanently closed gate was rebuilt on the site of the former entrance gate as a memorial. The move and reconstruction of the entrance gate are the consequence of the establishment of the Miu Fat Monastery: having a monastery face directly the entrance of a village is considered to have a negative influence on its feng shui. The former name of the village, "Tin Tsz Wai" (田子圍) is still inscribed on the former gate. A shrine is located at the northern end of the central axis. It was rebuilt in 1983.

== To Ancestral Halls ==
There are three To Ancestral Halls in Tuen Tsz Wai. All are located outside of the walled village. The oldest To Ancestral Hall (陶氏宗祠) was completed in 1718, during the reign of Kangxi Emperor, as a three-hall-two-courtyard structure. It was abandoned in 1971 due to feng shui concerns and was subsequently used as rattan and fiber factories until 1998. Vacated since 1998, it is now closed and in dilapidated condition. It is listed as a Grade I historic building.

The second one is the Ting Shan Ancestral Hall (定山祖祠), which commemorates To Ting Shan (陶定山), the sixth generation ancestor. Built during the reign of Kangxi Emperor, as a three-hall-two-courtyard structure, it was rebuilt in 1972 and is now abandoned.

A third To Ancestral Hall was built in 1971, replacing the one abandoned for feng shui reasons. It has a two-hall-style architecture and features abundant decorations. The main hall enshrines the To Clan ancestors' memorial tablets. The Ancestral Hall is also named "Ng Lau Tong" (五柳堂; 'Hall of Five Willows') to commemorate Tao Yuanming, also known as Mr. Ng Lau (五柳先生), a Chinese poet who lived during the Eastern Jin (317-420) and Liu Song (420-479) dynasties. The road nearby is also named Ng Lau Road (五柳路).

== Sam Shing Temple ==
The Sam Shing Temple (三聖宮) is dedicated to the Marshal Yuen Tan Fuk Fu (玄壇伏虎元帥; 'Tiger Suppressing General'), Hung Shing (洪聖) and Hau Wong (侯王). It was built by the To (陶) clan of the area, whose old ancestral hall is on its left, during the reigns of Yongzheng Emperor (1722-1735) and Qianlong Emperor (1735-1796). It was rebuilt in 1993, using modern materials including concrete and steel bars, while maintaining the shape of the original building.

== See also ==
- Walled villages of Hong Kong
- Tsing Chuen Wai, another walled village established by the To Clan, adjacent to Tuen Tsz Wai (north east)
- San Hing Tsuen, a village adjacent to Tuen Tsz Wai (south)
