= Tou (surname) =

- Language: Chinese, others

Other names
- Variant forms: Cambodian: Tu; Chinese: Dou, Tuo, Tao

Tou is a surname in various cultures.

== Origins ==
Tou may be:

- An English surname, recorded in the Domesday Book as the name of a landholder
- The Cantonese Jyutping romanisation of the Chinese surname spelled in Mandarin Pinyin as Táo (陶)
- The Wade–Giles romanisation of various Chinese surnames spelled in Pinyin as Dou (斗, 竇; IPA: /toʊ̯/)
- An alternative spelling of the Chinese surname spelled in Pinyin as Tuǒ (庹)
- A Cambodian surname (ទូ; IPA: /tuː/), spelled in both Geographic Department romanisation and UNGEGN romanisation as Tu

== Statistics ==
As of 2017, 2 people in Denmark and 48 people in Norway bore the surname Tou.

The 2010 United States census found 312 people with the surname Tou, making it the 63,873rd-most-common name in the country, up from 251 (72,237th-most-common) in the 2000 census. In both censuses, slightly more than three-quarters of the bearers of the surname identified as Asian, and between 10% and 15% as White.

== People ==
People with the surname Tou include:

- Tou Samouth (ទូ សាមុត; c. 1915–1962), Cambodian communist politician
- Holger Tou (1919–1947), Norwegian police official and collaborator with Nazi Germany
- Tou Chung-hua (Chinese: 庹宗華; pinyin: Tuǒ Zōnghuá; born 1962), Taiwanese actor
- Drissa Tou (born 1973), Burkinabe boxer
