= Wo Ping San Tsuen =

Village in Hong Kong

Coordinates: 22.430158°N 113.995313°E

Wo Ping San Tsuen (Chinese: 和平新村) is a village in Tuen Mun District, Hong Kong.

== Administration ==
Wo Ping San Tsuen is one of the 36 villages represented within the Tuen Mun Rural Committee. For electoral purposes, Wo Ping San Tsuen is part of the Tuen Mun Rural constituency.
