= Yuen Tau Shan =

Hill in Hong Kong

Coordinates: 22.432796°N 113.973414°E

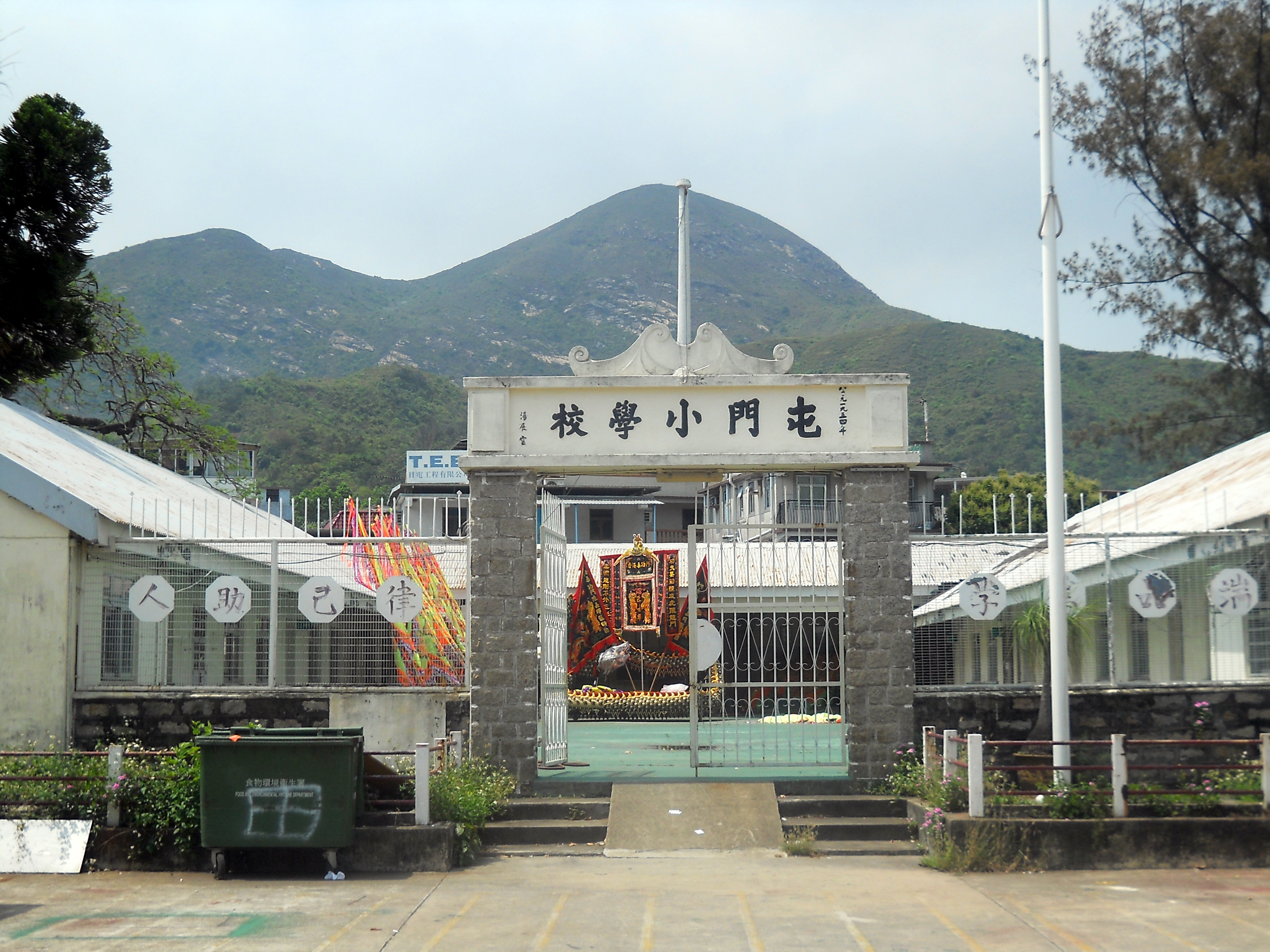
Former Tuen Mun Primary School in Tuen Tsz Wai, with Yuen Tau Shan in the background

Yuen Tau Shan (Chinese: 圓頭山) is a 375 m high hill in Yuen Long District, Hong Kong.

== See also ==
- List of mountains, peaks and hills in Hong Kong
