= Tuo =

Tuo is a Chinese surname (Chinese: 庹; pinyin: Tuǒ), and a given name in various cultures. 柁 is pronounced Tuó in Mandarin.

Notable people with the surname include:

== 庹 ==
- Tou Chung-hua (Chinese: 庹宗華; pinyin: Tuǒ Zōnghuá; born 1962), Taiwanese actor
- Tuo Tong (庹通, born 1984), Chinese fencer
- Tuo Zhen (庹震, born 1959), Chinese government official

== 柁 ==
- Tuo Jiaxi (柁嘉熹, born 1991), Chinese Go player

Notable people with the given name include (characters differ):

- Deng Tuo (邓拓, 1912–1966), Chinese poet, intellectual and journalist
- Tuo Fozié (fl. 2000s–present), Ivorian military officer
- Hua Tuo (華佗, died 208), Chinese physician
- Zhao Tuo (趙佗, circa 230–137 BC), Han Chinese commanding general of the Qin dynasty
