= Lam Tei =

Area in New Territories, Hong Kong

Coordinates: 22.419184°N 113.982707°E

- Traditional Chinese: 藍地
- Simplified Chinese: 蓝地
- Literal meaning: blue ground
Transcriptions
Standard Mandarin
- Hanyu Pinyin: Lándì
Yue: Cantonese
- Jyutping: laam4 dei6

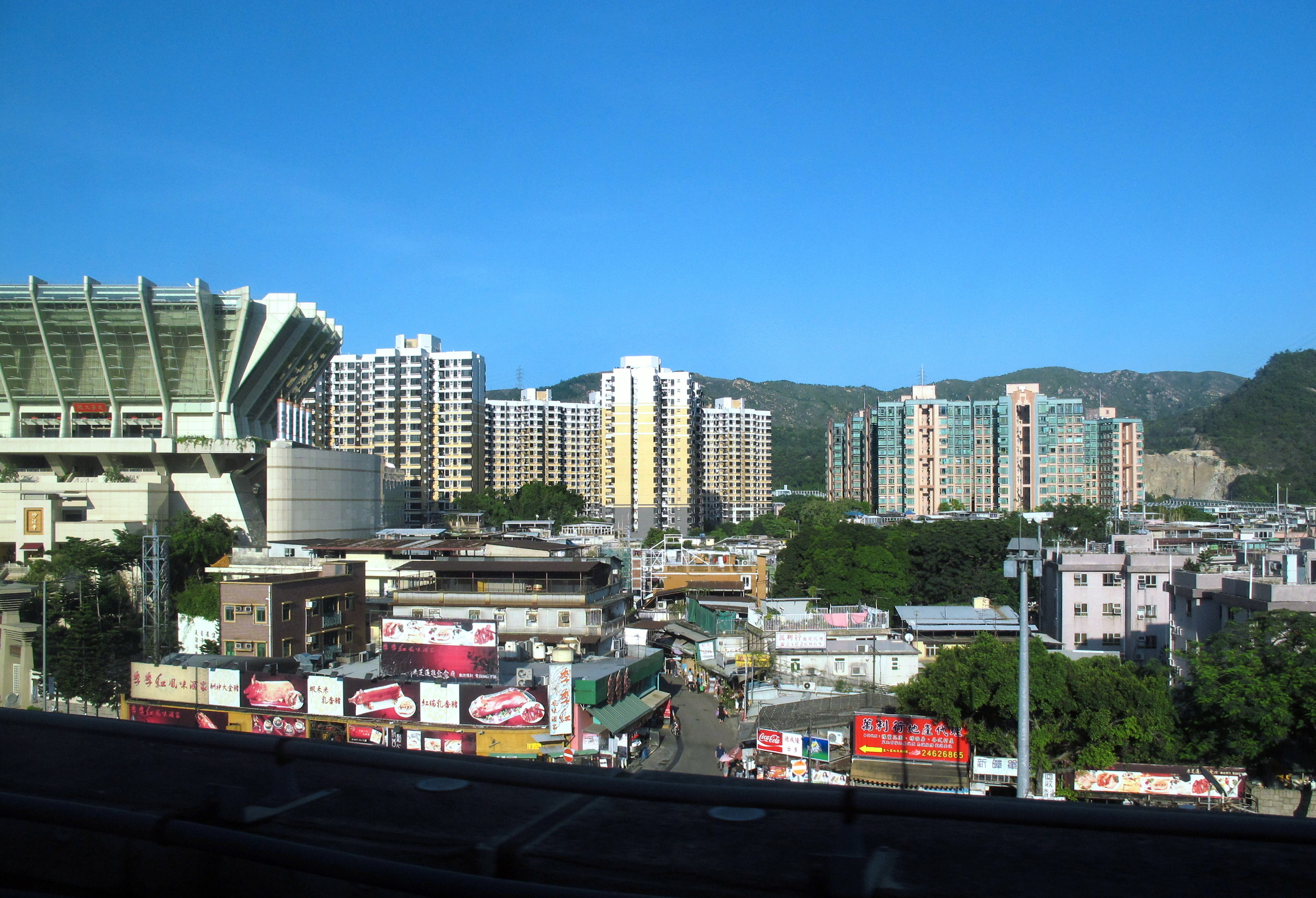
View of Lam Tei, with Miu Fat Buddhist Monastery on the left. The Sherwood and Botania Villa can be seen in the background.

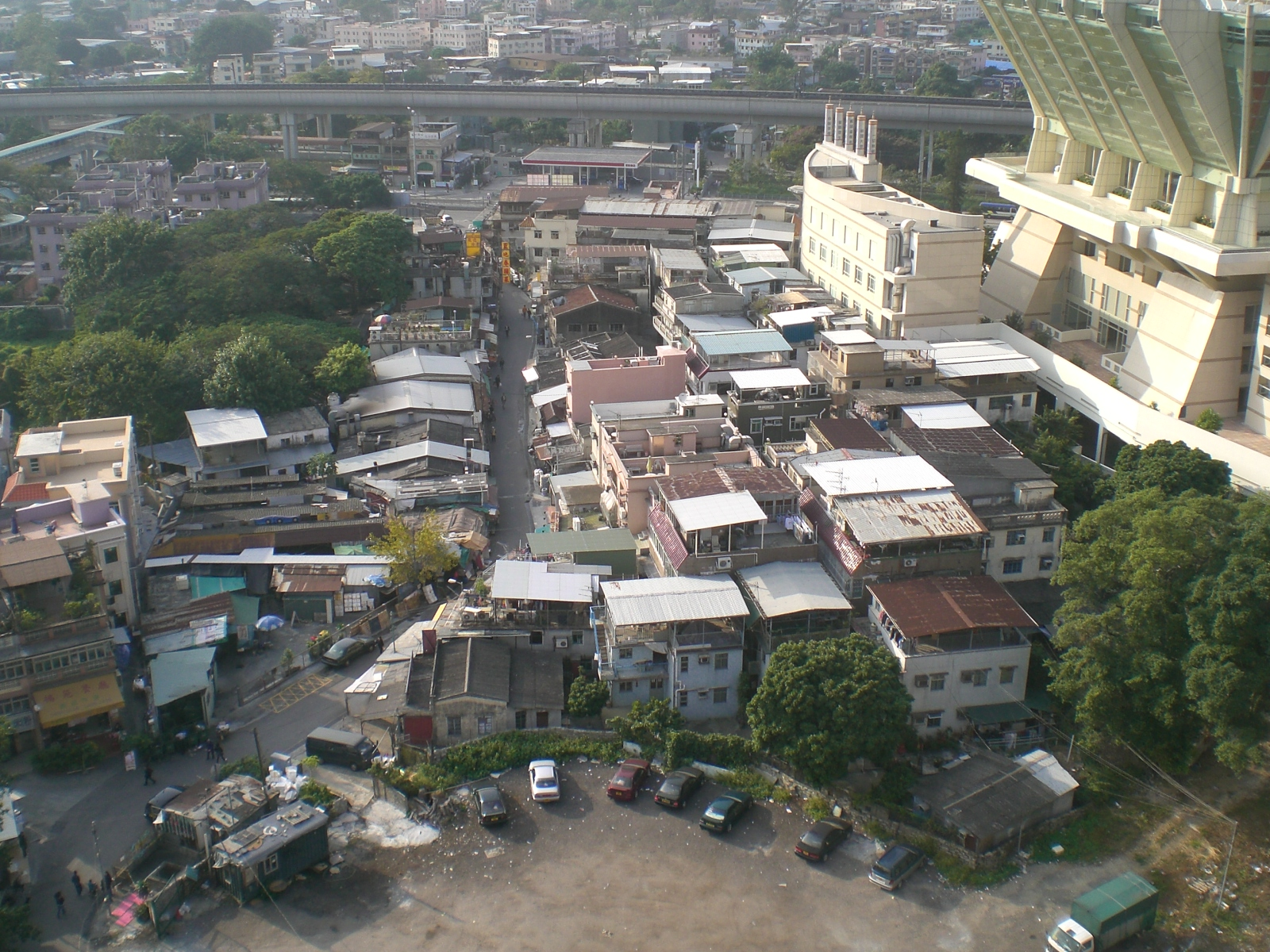
Lam Tei Main Street

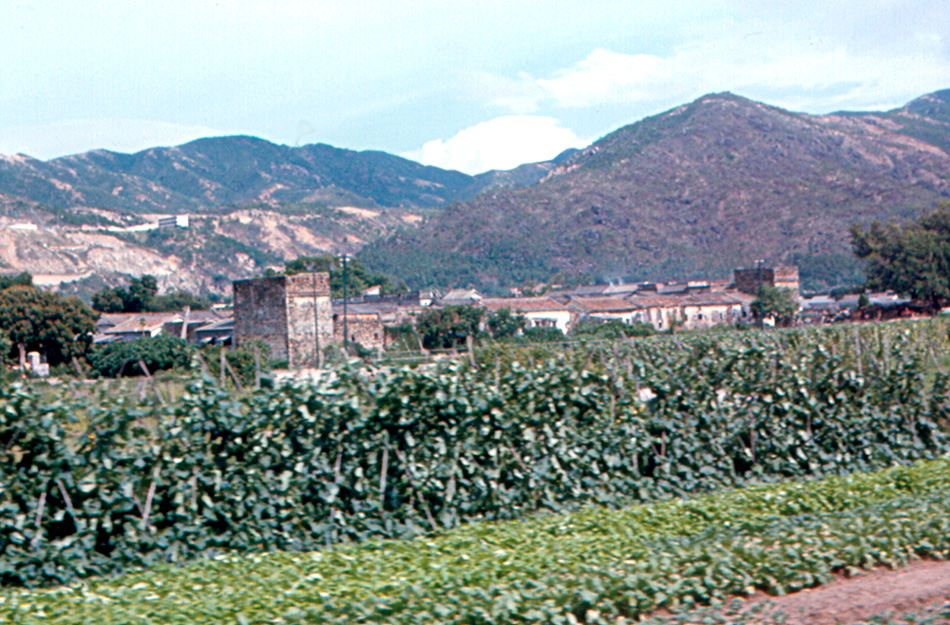
View of Nai Wai in the 1960s.

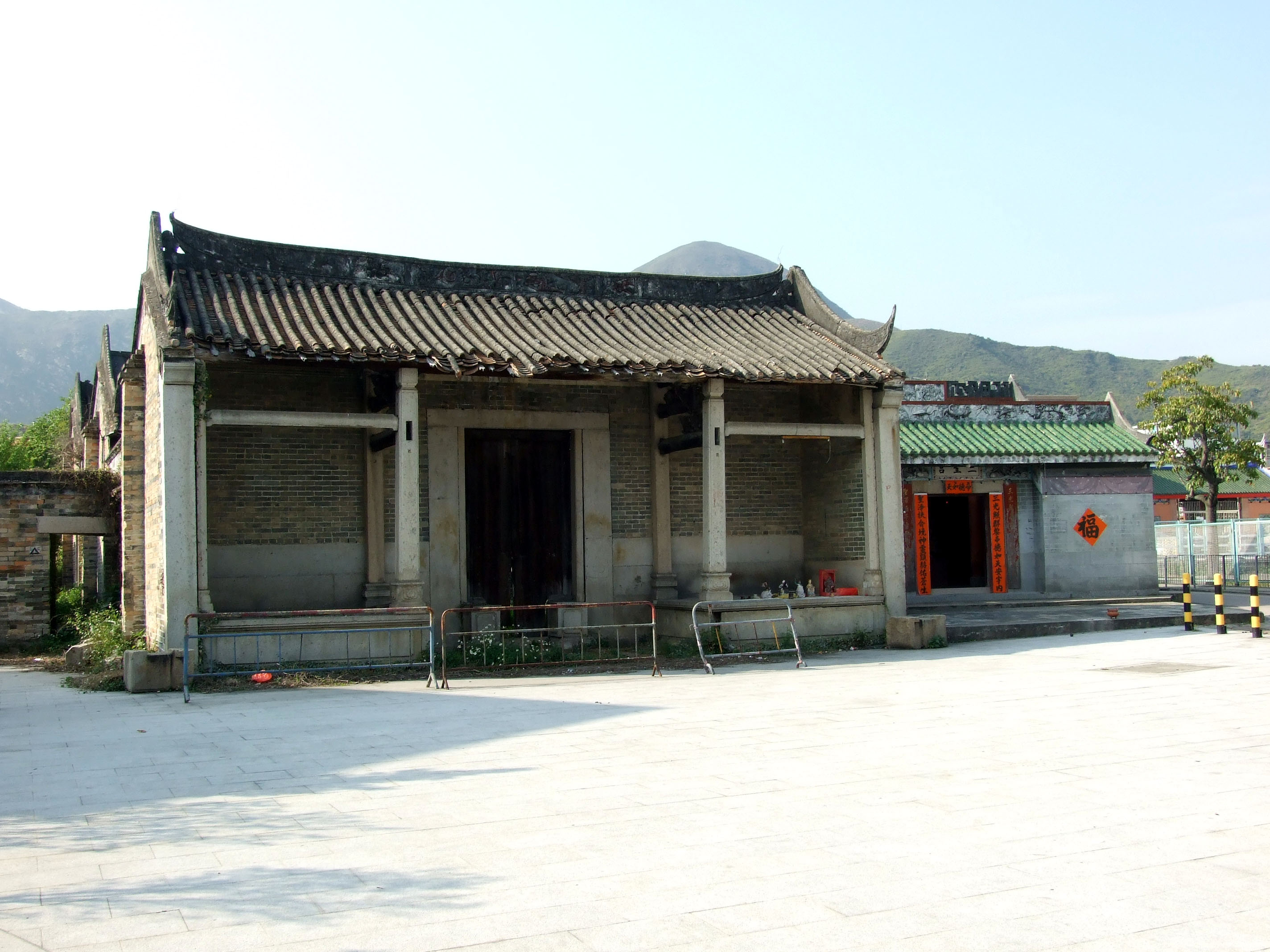
To Old To Clan Ancestral Hall (left) and Sam Shing Temple (right) in Tuen Tsz Wai, a walled village in Lam Tei. The New To Clan Ancestral Hall is to the right, behind the two buildings.

Lam Tei (Chinese: 藍地; Jyutping: laam4 dei6) is an area in the Tuen Mun District of the New Territories, Hong Kong. The region lies at the north end of Tuen Mun city. It is highly rural, with Miu Fat Buddhist Monastery being a landmark of the region.

== History ==
Several villages of the Lam Tei area were established by the To (陶) Clan. Originally from Poyang, Jiangxi (other sources mention Watlam in Guangxi), the To Clan moved to Ngau Tam Mei and then to Tuen Mun Tai Tsuen. Following the increase of the clan population, the village dispersed and developed into five villages in the Lam Tei area: Nai Wai, Tsing Chuen Wai, Tuen Tsz Wai, Lam Tei Tsuen and Tuen Mun San Tsuen, which were all fortified.

== Features ==
Features of the area include:

- Miu Fat Buddhist Monastery
- Several walled villages: Chung Uk Tsuen, Lam Tei Tsuen, Nai Wai, Sun Fung Wai, Tsing Chuen Wai, Tuen Tsz Wai, Tuen Mun San Tsuen
- Residential estates, including The Sherwood (豫豐花園) and Botania Villa (綠怡居)
- Lam Tei Quarry (藍地石礦場)
- Lam Tei Reservoir (藍地水塘)
- Hung Shui Hang Reservoir (洪水坑水塘)
- The Old To Ancestral Hall (陶氏宗祠) (pictured) in Tuen Tsz Wai was briefly used by the Japanese Army during the Second World War. The commander later moved the base elsewhere, after discovering the origins of the Clan tracing back to To Yuan Ming. The Old To Ancestral Hall later caught fire after the war, when the interior was rented out as a storage space for cargo. The To Clan later invested in a New Ancestral Hall, including a full sized statue of their ancestor, To Yuan Ming.

== Education ==
Lam Tei is in Primary One Admission (POA) School Net 70. Within the school net are multiple aided schools (operated independently but funded with government money) and the following government schools: Tuen Mun Government Primary School (屯門官立小學).

== Transportation ==
Lam Tei is reachable by Castle Peak Road. There is also a Light Rail stop, served by routes 610, 614, 615, and 751.

== See also ==
- List of planning areas in Hong Kong
- Hung Shui Kiu
- Tuen Mun River
- Yuen Long Highway
- Hong Kong–Shenzhen Western Corridor
- Tuen Mun Rural Committee
