= Tuen Mun Rural (constituency) =

Hong Kong constituency

- 屯門鄉郊
- Elected constituency for the Tuen Mun District Council
- Boundary of Tuen Mun Rural in Tuen Mun District
- District: Tuen Mun
- Legislative Council constituency: New Territories North West
- Population: 20,491 (2019)
- Electorate: 9,148 (2019)

Current constituency
- Created: 1994
- Number of members: One
- Member: Vacant

Tuen Mun Rural (Chinese: 屯門鄉郊) is one of the 31 constituencies in the Tuen Mun District.

Created for the 1994 District Board elections, the constituency returns one district councillor to the Tuen Mun District Council, with an election every four years.

Tuen Mun Rural loosely covers areas surrounding 18 Rosewood, Bauhinia Garden, Chung Uk Tsuen, Lam Tei, Nai Wai, The Sherwood, Tuen Tsz Wai, Wo Ping San Tsuen and Yick Yuen Tsuen in rural area Tuen Mun with an estimated population of 20,491.

== Councillors represented ==
Election	Member	Party
2019	Kenneth Cheung Kam-hung→Vacant	Independent

== Election results ==
=== 2010s ===
Tuen Mun District Council Election, 2019: Tuen Mun Rural
Party	Candidate	Votes	%	±%
Independent	Kenneth Cheung Kam-hung	3,797	60.17	
Nonpartisan	To Sheck-yuen	2,513	39.83	
Majority		1,284	20.34	
Turnout		6,329	69.25	
Independent gain from Nonpartisan		Swing		
