= Miu Fat Buddhist Monastery =

Buddhist monastery in Tuen Mun District, Hong Kong

Coordinates: 22.419821°N 113.983927°E

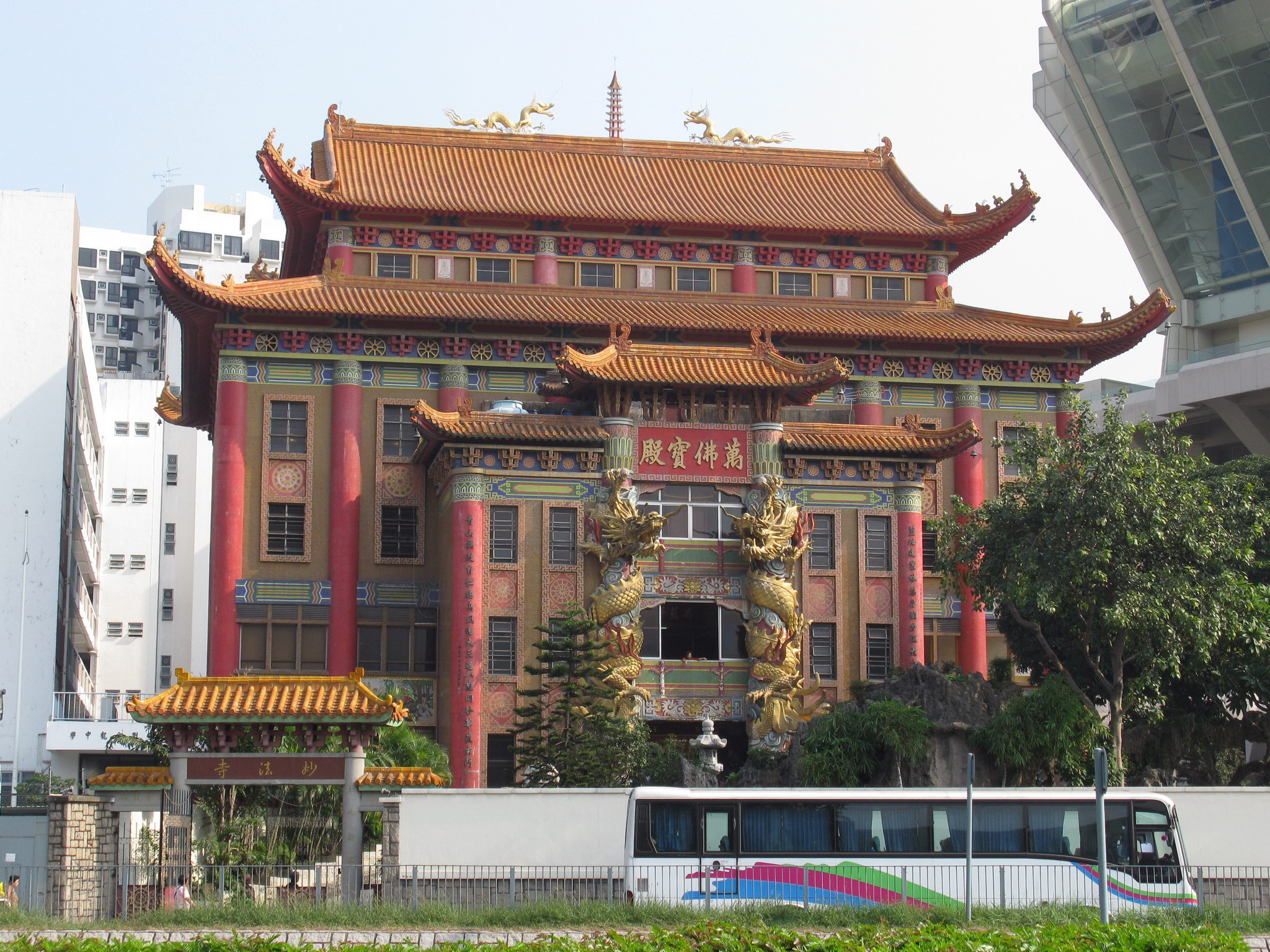
Ten Thousand Buddhas Hall of Miu Fat Buddhist Monastery.

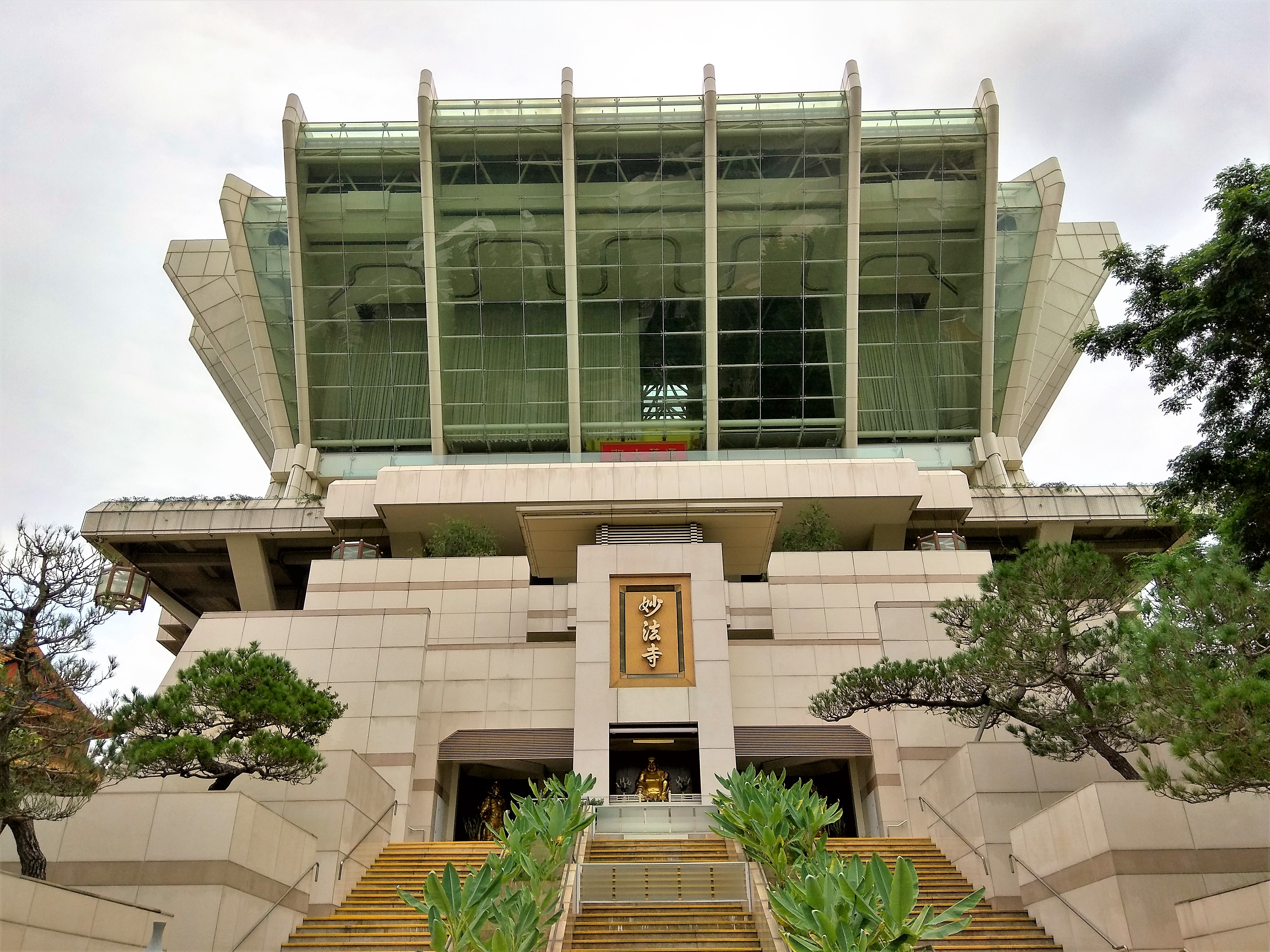
Miu Fat Buddhist Monastery.

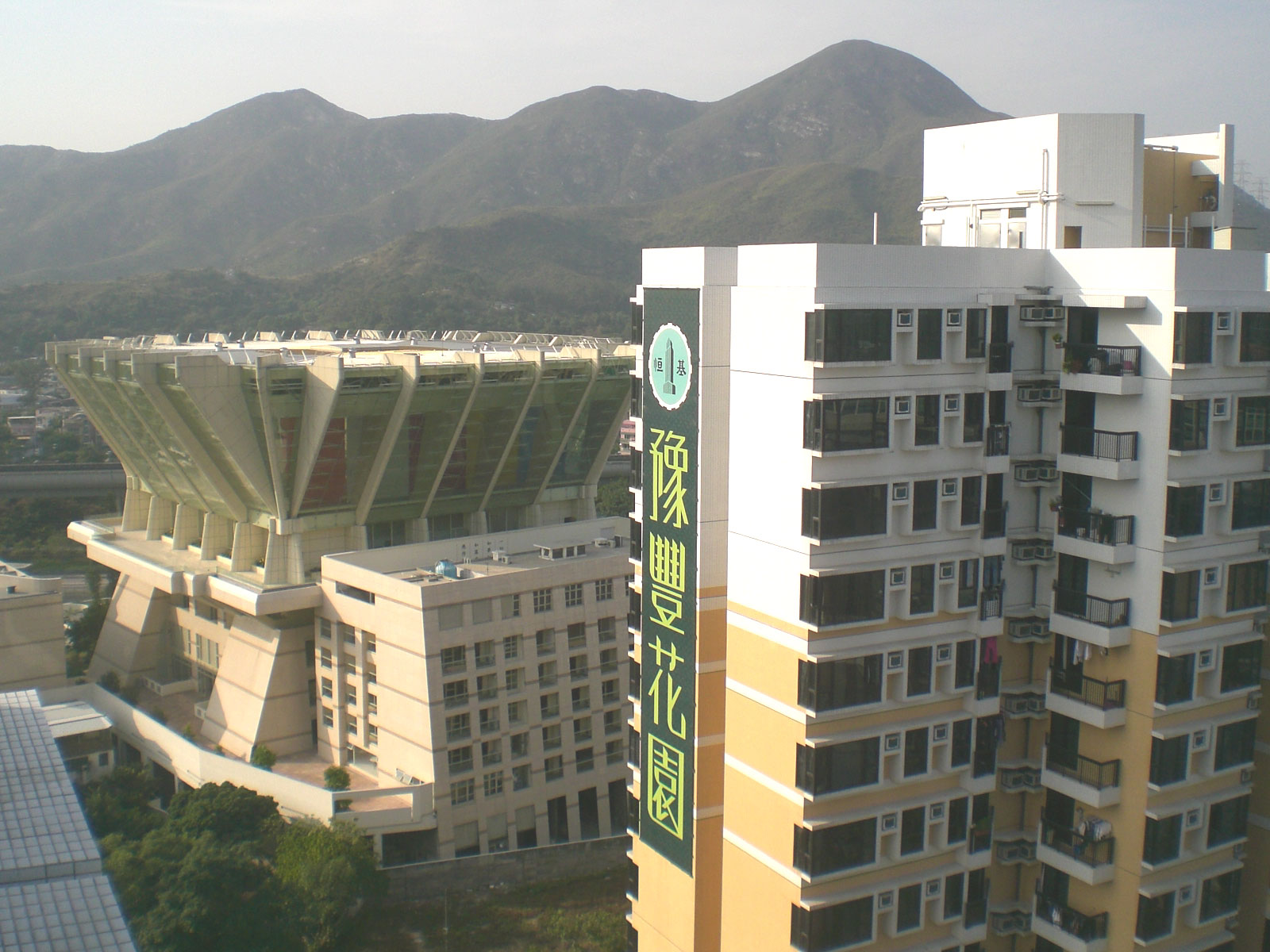
New complex of Miu Fat Buddhist Monastery. The building on the right belongs to The Sherwood private housing estate.

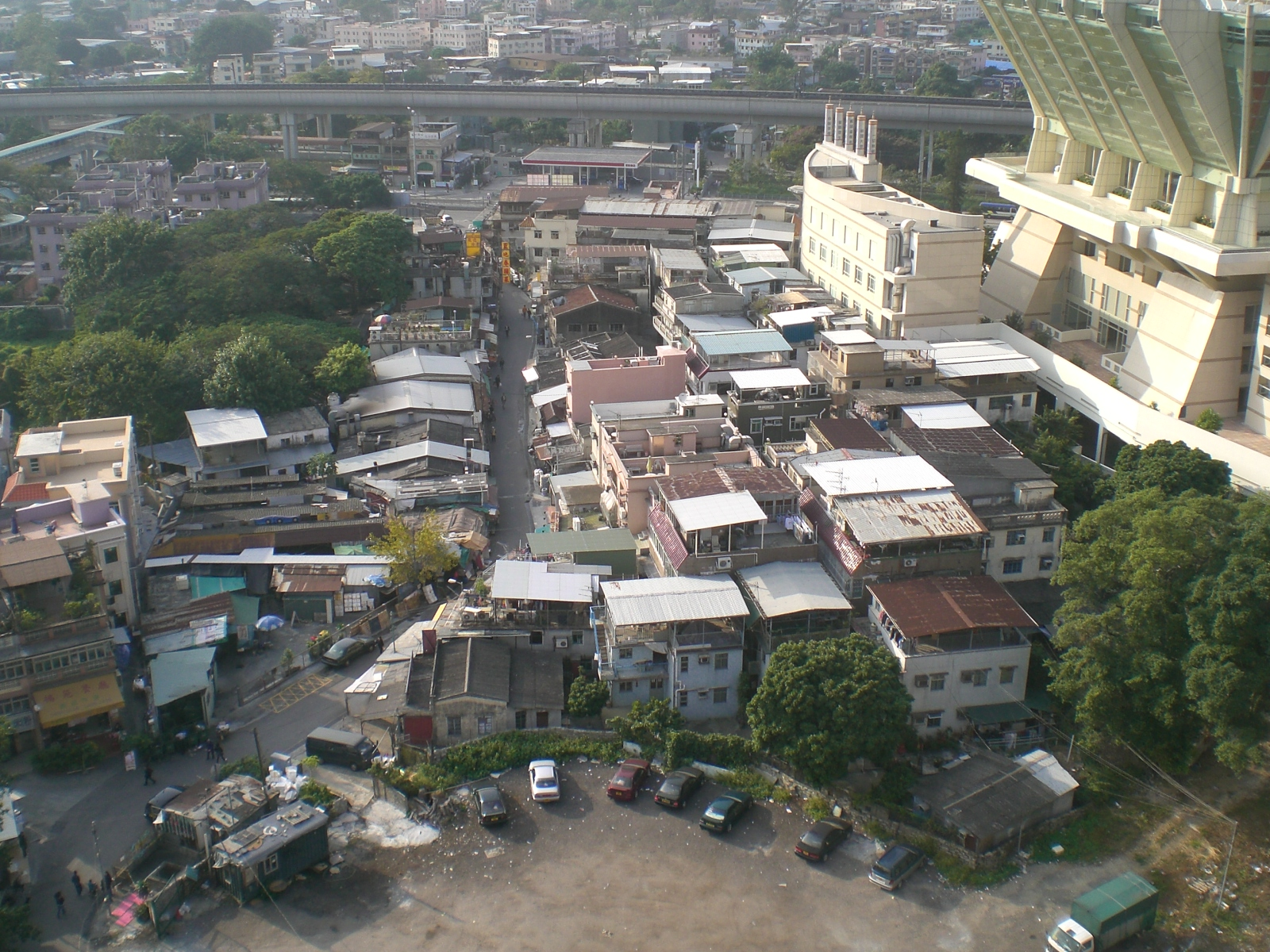
Lam Tei Main Street next to the Miu Fat Buddhist Monastery.

Miu Fat Buddhist Monastery (Chinese: 妙法寺; Jyutping: miu6 faat3 zi6) is a Buddhist monastery located in Lam Tei, Tuen Mun District, Hong Kong. Based on the principle of practising mercy, it has been actively organizing activities to promote Buddhism as well as education, culture, charity and welfare for years.

== History ==
The Miu Fat Buddhist Monastery was first constructed in 1950. Over the following two decades came the construction of the 3-storey Ten Thousand Buddhas Hall at a cost of $60 million. It took six years to complete, with its consecration ceremony held in May 1980. A ceremony marking the completion of the 45-metre high and 7-storey main complex was held in mid-March 2010.

== Features ==
The Mahavira Hall, located on the top storey of the Ten Thousand Buddhas Hall, has a floor height of about 20 metres. In the middle of the Hall, there are three gold-plated statues of the Buddha Sakyamuni, each of them is about 5-metre tall. Its interior walls are adorned with over 10 thousands of Buddha reliefs and a number of murals featuring a blend of Sino-Thai cultures. Higher up in the Hall are the Library of Buddhist Scriptures and the Attic of the Jade Buddha. On each side of the main entrance of the Hall is a 20-metre column carved with a dazzling lifelike giant gold-scaled dragon, making the building prominently imposing.

Adjoining the Ten Thousand Buddhas Hall, the 45-metre high and 7-storey main complex of Miu Fat Buddhist Monastery has been built since 1999. It comprises a Buddhist shrine, a community hall, a library and cultural/welfare facilities. The complex is meticulously designed with Lotus Shrine on the top floor resembling a gigantic crystal lotus blossom viewed from afar. A ceremony was held in mid-March 2010 to mark the completion of this electricity-saving and trendy Shrine. The lookout of the Shrine overlooks the landscape of Tuen Mun rural area.

The Monastery also has a kitchen serving vegetarian food for visitors.

== Transportation ==
The monastery can be accessed via the LRT through Lam Tei stop. Three bus routes also serve the monastery that being Routes 53, 63X and 68A.
