= Tao (surname) =

Tao is the pinyin romanization of the Chinese surname 陶 (Táo). It listed 31st in the Song-era Hundred Family Surnames poem.

Tao (陶) is not to be confused with the Vietnamese surname Tào, derived from the Chinese surname Cao (chữ Hán: 曹) or the Japanese surname Tao (田尾), notably the surname of ski jumper Katsushi Tao (田尾 克史; born 1963) and baseball player Yasushi Tao (田尾 安志; born 1954).

== Origin ==
Various Tao origins:

- Qi (surname) (祁)
- Public Officer of Zhou Dynasty
- Miao people
- Tujia people, Blang people, Yao people, Yi people, Dai people of Minority Group
- Mongolian
- Tuoheluo, Tuqin, Tuokuer family of Liaoning
- Xibe people

== Romanization ==
- Wade-Giles: T'ao, Tao (apostrophe is commonly omitted)
- Cantonese: To, Tou and Tow
- Minnan: Tô
- Teochew: Tau, Tow
- Gan: Tháu

=== Other languages ===
- Vietnamese: Đào (chữ Hán: 陶)
- Korean: Do (Korean: 도; Hanja: 陶)
- Japanese: Tō (陶)

== Distribution ==
Tao was the 82nd-most-common surname in mainland China, but it was unlisted among the 100 most common Taiwanese surnames.

Tao is a fairly uncommon surname in the United States, being ranked 12,503rd during the 1990 census and 10,033rd during the year 2000 census. Families of Tao ancestry distributed towards the European lands from previous wealthy families gaining reputations within European aristocracy particularly within the British and the Dutch. Few former aristocratic families of Tao ancestry now live quiet lives throughout Europe as well as many returning to Hong Kong, China or the America's within the late 20th century.

== History ==
Some Zhejiangese Tao who joined the White Banner upon the advent of the Qing dynasty Manchufied their name to Tohoro (simplified Chinese: 托活络; traditional Chinese: 託濶羅; pinyin: tuōhuóluò). Notable descendants along this line include Duanfang. The Mandarin form of the surname 陶 meaning ‘ceramics’ in Chinese: (i) from the placename Tao (陶) said to be the original residence of the legendary Emperor Yao (c. 24th century BC). (ii) from Tao Zheng (陶正) ‘ceramics officer’ post name of an official in charge of the making of ceramics during the Western Zhou dynasty (1046–771 BC). (iii) borne by the descendants of the Shang dynasty (1600–1046 BC). The Tao family was one of the seven clans of the Shang dynasty that were sent to the state of Wey after the annihilation of the Shang dynasty.

== People with the surname ==
Tao

- David Tao or Tao Zhe, singer
- Tao Kan, Jin Dynasty general and governor
- Tao Luna, sports shooter
- Matilda Tao, Taiwanese actress and singer
- Meixia Tao, Chinese electrical engineer
- Michael Tao, television actor
- Tao Qian, warlord during the late Han Dynasty
- Tao Yuanming, scholar and poet of the Jin dynasty
- Tao Siju, politician
- Terence Tao, Australian mathematician and 2006 Fields Medalist
- Tao Zhu, politician
- Tao Hongkai, Chinese-American scholar, activist
- Zhong Tao (born 2001), Chinese high jumper
- Tao Sijin, Chinese murderer
- Tao Geoghegan Hart, British cyclist who currently rides for UCI WorldTeam Lidl–Trek

Tohoro

- Duanfang, Qing-era politician
