= 2025 Australia Day Honours =

Annual honours list

The 2025 Australia Day Honours are appointments to various orders and honours to recognise and reward good works by Australian citizens. The list was announced on 26 January 2025 by the Governor General of Australia, Sam Mostyn.

The Australia Day Honours are the first of the two major annual honours lists, the first announced to coincide with Australia Day (26 January), with the other being the King's Birthday Honours, which are announced on the second Monday in June.

== Order of Australia ==
Order of Australia civil ribbon

Order of Australia military ribbon

=== Companion of the Order of Australia (AC) ===
==== General Division ====
- Professor Allen Cheuk-Seng Cheng – For eminent service to medicine as an epidemiologist, to infectious and communicable disease research and education, and to national and international public health policy.
- Scientia Professor Megan Jane Davis – For eminent service to the law and to social justice, to the national and international advocacy of the rights of Indigenous peoples, and to the community.
- The Honourable James Joshua Edelman – For eminent service to the law and to the judiciary, to legal education and scholarship, as a mentor to academics and legal practitioners in Australia and internationally, and to the community.
- Emeritus Professor Gillian Doreen Triggs – For eminent service to humanitarian and human rights law, to international relations, to social justice advocacy, and to tertiary legal education and research.
- Eve Lynnette (Lyn) Williams – For eminent service to the arts as an administrator, and to the museums and galleries sector through philanthropic donations.
- The late Galarrwuy Yunupingu – For eminent service to First Nation Peoples, in particular traditional land ownership, to leadership in economic development initiatives, to fostering reconciliation and respect, and as a custodian of culture and ceremony.

=== Officer of the Order of Australia (AO) ===
==== General Division ====
- The Honourable Justice John Basten – For distinguished service to the law as a judge, to legal education, to board and commission roles, and as a champion of Indigenous and human rights.
- Emeritus Professor Andrew William Blakers – For distinguished service to science in the field of solar cell development, and as an advocate for energy storage and renewable technologies.
- The Honourable Cheryl Lynn Edwardes – For distinguished service to the law and social justice, to resource management and environmental sustainability, to business, and to the community.
- Professor Bronwyn Louise Fox – For distinguished service to public administration, to scientific research and development, to advanced manufacturing, and to tertiary education.
- Professor John Francis Fraser – For distinguished service to medicine as an intensive care physician and surgeon, and to global critical care research.
- Professor Thomas Gottlieb – For distinguished service to medicine as an infectious disease and microbiology specialist, author and researcher, and to professional organisations.
- Professor Graeme John Hankey – For distinguished service to medicine as a neurologist and stroke physician, to research, and as an editor and author.
- The Honourable Duncan James Kerr – For distinguished service to the law and social justice, to the Parliament of Australia, and to the people of Tasmania.
- Dr Hugh Kirkman – For distinguished service to conservation and the protection, management and sustainability of seagrasses and marine ecosystems.
- Laurie Joseph Lawrence – For distinguished service to water safety education, and to swimming as a high-performance coach.
- Dr Laurence Alfred Mound – For distinguished service to scientific research into the identification and biology of plant feeding insects.
- Emeritus Professor Keith Alexander Nugent – For distinguished service to tertiary education, to science as a physicist, and to the advancement of optical physics.
- The Honourable Justice Brian John Preston – For distinguished service to the judiciary and the law, to legal academia, and to environmental and natural resources governance and education.
- Professor Robynne Melva Quiggin – For distinguished service to the law and human rights, to tertiary education, and to the Indigenous community through leadership and governance roles.
- The late Professor Lyndall Ryan – For distinguished service to tertiary education, particularly Indigenous history and colonial settlement through research and publications.
- Scientia Professor Veena Sahajwalla – For distinguished service to science as an engineer and inventor, to sustainable materials research and technology and waste management.
- David Edgar Shelmerdine – For distinguished service to conservation and environmental sustainability through sector governance and philanthropic contributions.
- The Honourable Nicholas John Sherry – For distinguished service to the Parliament of Australia, to the governance and operation of the superannuation industry, and to the people of Tasmania.
- Sally Sievers – For distinguished service to the law, to social justice and human rights, and to the community of the Northern Territory.
- James Christopher Simpson – For distinguished service to people with disability through legal and board leadership positions, and as an advocate for their health and wellbeing.
- Professor Claire Edwina Smith – For distinguished service to tertiary education, particularly social and anthropological archaeology, and as a national and international academic.
- Professor Richard Anthony Strugnell – For distinguished service to medicine, particularly microbiology, immunology and vaccinology through tertiary education, research and board positions.
- Pamela Maunsell Wall – For distinguished service to the community through charitable support and philanthropic contributions, and to the community of South Australia.

==== Military Division ====
Navy

- Rear Admiral Jonathan Paul Earley, CSC, RAN – For distinguished service to the Royal Australian Navy in key command and senior leadership positions.

=== Member of the Order of Australia (AM) ===
==== General Division ====
- The Honourable Ann Margaret Ainslie-Wallace – For significant service to the judiciary and the law, to legal advocacy education, and to professional associations.
- Kevin Sidney Anderson – For significant service to the law, and social justice.
- The late the Honourable Kevin James Andrews – For significant service to the people and Parliament of Australia, to the Catholic Church, and to the community.
- Professor Samar Mouin Aoun – For significant service to community health through palliative and aged care research, and to tertiary education.
- Professor Lauren Ayton – For significant service to optometry, to ophthalmology, and to public health as a clinician and researcher.
- Geoffrey Robert Baker – For significant service to primary industry, and to the community.
- Dr Cameron John Bell – For significant service to gastroenterology medicine as a clinician and administrator.
- Professor Kim Bennell – For significant service to medical research and education, particularly in the field of health and rehabilitation science.
- Gerard Bertelkamp – For significant service to the performing arts as a singer, songwriter and musician.
- Dr Antheunis Boogert – For significant service to obstetric medicine as an administrator and clinician.
- Dr James Maurice Branley – For significant service to diagnostic pathology, and to medical administration.
- David John Briggs – For significant service to the performing arts as a guitarist, songwriter and producer.
- Ross Mathews Brown – For significant service to wine making industry, and to tourism.
- The Honourable Denis Gabriel Burke – For significant service to the Legislative Assembly of the Northern Territory, and to the community.
- Margaret Elizabeth Burn – For significant service to library and information science, and to the community.
- Julian Richard Burt – For significant service to the arts, to the church, and to the environment.
- Professor Joshua Byrne – For significant service to conservation and the environment, and as a media presenter and author.
- Michael Phillip Byrne – For significant service to the transport industry, and to the community.
- Joanna Susan Capon – For significant service to the arts, and to community health.
- Robert Ian Chapman – For significant service to the financial sector, and to Australian rules football.
- Professor Philip Tiet Chung – For significant service to the law, particularly his contribution to public access to legal information, and to tertiary education.
- Lauretta Jayne Claus – For significant service to international and national basketball as a statistician, and to education.
- Anne Coghlan – For significant service to the legal profession, and to judicial administration.
- Patrick Francis Condon – For significant service to arts administration, and the entertainment industry.
- Samantha Jayne Connor – For significant service to people with disability.
- Phillip James Cornwell – For significant service to conservation and the environment, community health, and to the legal profession.
- Dr Christine Helen Craik – For significant service to the community as a social worker, to tertiary education, and as a volunteer.
- Carmel Helena Crouch – For significant service to people with disability.
- Dr Ross Stanley Cutler – For significant service to veterinary medicine, and to the pork industry.
- The Honourable John Howard Day – For significant service to the people and Parliament of Western Australia.
- Margaret Beth Donnan – For significant service to occupational hygiene, chemical engineering, and to professional associations.
- Jeffrey Lane Floyd – For significant service to the community through a range of executive roles.
- Matthew Grant Formston – For significant service to people with disability, and to para sports.
- Professor Margaret Mary Fry – For significant service to the nursing profession, and to tertiary education.
- Dr Gregory George Gambrill – For significant service to science, and to public health and nutrition.
- Penelope Margaret Gerstle – For significant service to human rights, community health, and to people with disability.
- Professor Paul Andrew Glare – For significant service to medicine in the field of pain management and palliative care.
- Jodie May Goldsworthy – For significant service to primary industry, particularly the honey bee and pollination sector.
- Stephen Alexander Grieve – For significant service to architecture, and to arts development through leadership roles.
- The Honourable Dr Kim Desmond Hames – For significant service to the Parliament of Western Australia, to medicine, and to the community.
- Gaye Lorraine Hamilton – For significant service to tertiary education, and to the community.
- Dr Jessie Helen Harman – For significant service to social change leadership, and to the community of regional Victoria.
- Professor David Headon – For significant service to history preservation, as a historian, cultural advisor, and author.
- Joanne Margaret Hedges – For significant service to Indigenous community, particularly through oral health research and improved outcomes.
- The late Dr Daryll Raymond Hull – For significant service to the transport industry, and to tertiary education.
- Dr Vera Ignjatovic – For significant service to medical science in paediatric disorders and proteomics, to promotion of STEM to under-represented populations, and as a mentor.
- Professor Alun Conrad Jackson – For significant service to health sciences, particularly as a researcher and academic.
- Janet Elizabeth Jackson – For significant service to lacrosse as an official and administrator.
- Dr Kym Jenkins – For significant service to psychiatry as a clinician, academic and in executive roles.
- Adam David Johnston – For significant service to community health, to the law, and to people living with disability.
- Judge Christopher Nigel Kendall – For significant service to the judiciary, to the law, and to the legal profession.
- Emeritus Professor David Leslie Kennedy – For significant service to archaeology as a researcher and academic.
- Peter St John Kennedy – For significant service to the print and broadcast media as a journalist.
- Deborah Anne Killelea – For significant service to the community through charitable organisations.
- Ian Roderick Macintosh – For significant service to the media and broadcast industry.
- The late Paul Richard Madden – For significant service to the community through social welfare organisations, social policy development, and the arts.
- Dr James Markos – For significant service to medical education and research, particularly respiratory and sleep disorders.
- Ian George Marler – For significant service to surveying, and to the community.
- Dr Katherine Ella Martin – For significant service to medicine, particularly trauma care and surgery, and to professional associations.
- Professor Stephen Peter McDonald – For significant service to kidney medicine as an administrator, researcher and clinician.
- Joan McKenna Kerr – For significant service to people with disability in leadership and advocacy roles.
- Dr Robyn Maree Miller – For significant service to children, young people and families.
- Dr David Geoffrey Mills – For significant service to medicine through international development, and rural and remote health education.
- Rosslyn Joy Monro – For significant service social welfare organisations, and to the law.
- The late Lionel Richard Morgan – For significant service to rugby league, and to the Indigenous community.
- Dr Alexander John Moule – For significant service to dentistry as a clinician and academic, and to professional associations.
- Professor Andrew Mowbray – For significant service to the law, particularly his contribution to public access to legal information, and to tertiary education.
- Joanna Murray-Smith – For significant service to the performing arts as a writer.
- Professor Sharon Linda Naismith – For significant service to neuropsychology, particularly dementia, through medical research and clinical practice.
- Associate Professor Patrick James O'Connor – For significant service to community health, and to conservation and the environment.
- The Reverend Gerda Johanna Olafsen – For significant service to the Uniting Church in Australia, and to the community.
- Professor Paul Andrew Pickering – For significant service to tertiary education, social studies, and to history preservation.
- The late Dr Richard Norman Porter – For significant service to medicine, particularly women's health as a clinician and in leadership roles.
- Russell Donald Postle – For significant service to community health, the accountancy profession, and to the community.
- Dr Shirley Prager – For significant service to psychiatry, and to professional organisations.
- Alister John Purbrick – For significant service to the wine industry.
- Margaret Ann Putt – For significant service to conservation and the environment, and to the Parliament of Tasmania.
- Dr Craig Robert Rayner – For significant service to pharmacology in a range of roles and organisations.
- Dr Karen Ann Read – For significant service to cricket, and to secondary education.
- Professor Julie Redfern – For significant service to cardiology, to allied health, to research and education, and to the community.
- Dr Susan Gae Reed – For significant service to the occupational and environmental health and safety sector.
- The Honourable Richard Christopher Refshauge – For significant service to the community of the Australian Capital Territory, and to the arts.
- Professor Emerita Léonie Jean Rennie – For significant service to tertiary education as a mentor and academic.
- The Honourable Alan Robertson – For significant service to the law, to the judiciary, and to the legal profession.
- Professor David Theunis Runia – For significant service to tertiary education, and as an academic in the fields of humanities and social sciences.
- The Honourable John Robertson Sackar – For significant service to the judiciary, and to the law.
- Dr Peter Andrew Sawczak – For significant service to international relations through defence and strategic policy development.
- Daryl Gordon Scott – For significant service to youth in leadership roles, and to the community.
- Marie Therese Sellstrom – For significant service to the community through social welfare organisations.
- Geoffrey Neame Sharrock – For significant service to the mining industry, and to the community.
- The Honourable James Robert Short – For significant service to the Parliament of Australia, to multiculturalism, and to international relations.
- Wendy Susan Simpson – For significant service to social welfare, to cultural and church organisations, and as a mentor.
- Emeritus Professor Ilana Snyder – For significant service to the Jewish community of Australia, and to tertiary education.
- David Ian Stuart-Watt – For significant service to the civil infrastructure and transport industry.
- Raelee Helen Thompson – For significant service to cricket as a player, coach, and administrator.
- Professor Nina Tirnitz-Parker – For significant service to biomedical science.
- Professor Julian Norman Trollor – For significant service to people with disability, particularly as a clinician and academic.
- Sylvia Medlyn Tulloch – For significant service to the renewable energy, innovation and technology commercialisation sectors.
- Leesa Ann Watego – For significant service to Indigenous business and media sectors, and to the community.
- Professor Robert Gideon Weintraub – For significant service to paediatric medicine, and to medical research.
- Ann Weldon – For significant service to the Indigenous community of New South Wales.
- Shanna Whan – For significant service to community health.
- Professor Stuart Bruce White – For significant service to environmental research, to corporate sustainability, and to tertiary education.
- Emeritus Professor Joe Wolfe – For significant service to tertiary education, and to music.

===== General Division – Honorary =====
- Rose Cuff – For significant service to community mental health, and to youth.
- Murray Forrest – For significant service to the film and television industry.
- The late Emeritus Professor Joseph Henry Graffam – For significant service to tertiary education, and to social welfare organisations.
- Associate Professor Susan Elizabeth Mathers – For significant service to medicine as a clinician, and to neurological research.

==== Military Division ====
Navy

- Commodore Richard Anthony Caton, PSM, RAN – For exceptional service in senior Defence management and international relationship roles.
- Rear Admiral David Peter Mann, CSC, RAN – For exceptional service to the Australian Defence Force in senior Command and staff roles.

Army

- Major General B – For exceptional service to the Defence Intelligence Enterprise as Director General of Intelligence, Director General Geospatial Capability Integration, and the Head of Intelligence Capability.
- Brigadier Matthew Stuart Campbell, CSC – For exceptional performance of duty representing Australia as the Army Attaché Jakarta and as the Head of Australian Defence Staff Jakarta, enhancing the Australian Defence Force’s relationship with Indonesia.
- Colonel Martin John Levey – For exceptional performance of duty to the Australian Defence Force in the fields of Aviation Safety, Human Factors and Organisational Psychology.
- Colonel Thomas Robson McDermott, CSC, DSO – For exceptional service as the Headquarters Joint Operations Command lead planner for the development of an Australian Defence Force operational contingency plan in support of Australia Defence Force Operations

Air Force

- Wing Commander Cameron Murray Douglas – For exceptional service delivering advanced integrated air and missile defence capability for the Australian Defence Force and the United States Air Force.
- Group Captain Marija Jovanovich, CSM – For exceptional service to the Royal Australian Air Force in the provision of command and leadership within the Orion AP-3EW maritime patrol capability.
- Air Commodore Matthew Robert McCormack – For exceptional service in advancing the F-35A Lightning II air combat capability for the Australian Defence Force.
- Air Commodore Michael Joseph Reidy – For exceptional service to the Australian Defence Force in cyber and communications appointments.
- Warrant Officer Vanessa Christine Schneider – For exceptional service as a Warrant Officer in the Royal Australian Air Force.

=== Medal of the Order of Australia (OAM) ===
==== General Division ====
- Saba Abraham – For service to the Eritrean and African communities of Australia.
- Dr Wally Ahmar – For service to medicine, particularly cardiology
- Norman Octavius Alexander – For service to agriculture, and to the community of Wagga Wagga.
- Jed Norman Altschwager – For service to sport as a gold medallist at the Paris Paralympic Games 2024.
- Jennifer Gai Anderson – For service to the community of Ku-ring-gai.
- Catrina Luz Aniere – For service to children and youth, and to environmental education.
- Annamaria Arabia – For service to science, particularly through organisational leadership roles.
- Paul Charles Archer – For service to rugby league as a referee.
- Jesse Bage Aungles – For service to sport as a gold medallist at the Paris Paralympic Games 2024.
- Nikki Louise Ayers – For service to sport as a gold medallist at the Paris Paralympic Games 2024.
- The late Associate Professor Philip James Ayres – For service to literature, and to education.
- Dianna Faye Baker – For service to local government, and to the community of Inverell.
- Janice Lorraine Ballard – For service to the community of Dimboola.
- Anna Louise Barwick – For service to the pharmacy profession.
- Emily Jane Beecroft – For service to sport as a gold medallist at the Paris Paralympic Games 2024.
- Paul Justin Begaud – For service to the music industry as a songwriter and producer.
- Anita Bejerano – For service to the Jewish community through a range of roles.
- David John Bertenshaw – For service to soccer as an administrator and coach.
- Vivienne Bertenshaw – For service to netball as an administrator and coach.
- Gulghotai Bezhan – For service to the Afghan community of Victoria.
- Rachel Bin Salleh – For service to literature.
- David John Blackmore – For service to the beef cattle industry.
- Lisa Blair – For service to sailing.
- Ruth Robyn Blakely – For service to the community of Tamworth.
- Gwendoline Blandthorn – For service to the community of Murtoa.
- Wesley Donald Bleakley – For service to people with a disability.
- Oliver Dylan Bleddyn – For service to sport as a gold medallist at the Paris Olympic Games 2024.
- Kingsley Charles Blenkiron – For service to the community of Onkaparinga.
- Gregory Thomas Blood – For service to sports history.
- Roger Maxwell Blythman – For service to the community, and to the church.
- Korey Richard Boddington – For service to sport as a gold medallist at the Paris Paralympic Games 2024.
- Patrick Gerard Boland – For service to the manufacturing industry.
- Professor Claudine Sharon Bonder – For service to medical research.
- Elizabeth Anne Bonetti – For service to music.
- Rae Joy Bonney – For service to community mental health.
- David Robert Booth – For service to dentistry.
- David John Botting – For service to agriculture, and to the community of Millicent.
- Keith Bernard Boulton – For service to community, particularly through history preservation.
- Teresa Ann Bourke – For service to swimming as a coach, and to people with disability.
- Debra Lee Boutcher – For service to the arts, and to the community of Horsham.
- John Bowie Wilson – For service to the financial sector.
- Julie Elizabeth Brady – For service to the community through social welfare organisations.
- Peter Millar Bray – For service to the community of the Southern Highlands.
- Hannah Brennan – For service to the multicultural community of Melbourne.
- Carol Anne Briscoe – For service to the church.
- Grace Lowden Brown – For service to sport as a gold medallist at the Paris Olympic Games 2024.
- Sarah Suzanne Bryja (Tinney) – For service to the community through charitable organisations.
- Sharon Therese Buckley – For service to the community through emergency response organisations.
- Michael Buettner – For service to the community, and to sport.
- Clothilde Elena Bullen – For service to Indigenous arts.
- Dr Wendy Christina Bunston – For service to social welfare research.
- Maxwell Burt – For service to people with disability.
- Angelina Butler – For service to the community, particularly through emergency response organisations.
- Colin Patrick Butt – For service to the community of the Eurobodalla Shire.
- The late John Nicholson Buttrum – For service to cricket, and to the community.
- Shani Cain – For service to youth through charitable organisations.
- Kenneth George Cameron – For service to the community of Marlee.
- Stacey Elizabeth Campton – For service to netball, and to the Indigenous community.
- Dr Joseph Bartolo Casamento – For service to rugby union as a club doctor.
- Christabel Marguerite Chamarette – For service to community health, particularly as a psychologist.
- Julie Charlton – For service to sport, and to people with disability.
- Maritsa Cibas – For service to the Lithuanian community of Sydney.
- Romualdas Cibas – For service to the Australian Lithuanian community
- Vincent Ciccarello – For service to arts administration.
- Gregory Paul Clareburt – For service to the community of the Noosa region.
- Lloyd Thomas Clarke – For service to domestic violence support and welfare.
- Suzanne Patrica Clarke – For service to domestic violence support and welfare.
- Pauline Joan Cline – For service to the community of the Bellarine region.
- The late James Campbell Cobb – For service to the visual arts industry.
- Geoffrey Michael Collinson – For service to cricket.
- Dr Andre Conradie – For service to medicine, and to community health.
- Joanne Gay Cook – For service to community mental health.
- Robert John Cooke – For service to the community of Port Lincoln.
- Jack Thomas Cooper – For service to the community through a range of volunteer roles.
- Lisa Ann Cox – For service to people with disability.
- Darryl Keith Davenport – For service to dance sports.
- Geoffrey Ballantyne Davidson – For service to the community of Upper Beaconsfield.
- The late Frank Leslie Davis – For service to veterans and their families.
- Kaye de Jersey – For service to the Crown, and to the community of Queensland.
- Valmai Lorraine Dempsey – For service to community health.
- Adrian Guido Di Marco – For service to information technology, and to the community.
- Jayne Louise Dicketts – For service to community health, and to nursing.
- Catherine Dillon – For service to youth, and to secondary education.
- Michael John Dinn – For service to engineering, particularly deep space tracking and exploration.
- Barbara Wendy Dodd – For service to the community of Ensay.
- The late Neil Donaldson – For service to the livestock industry.
- Shane Gerard Donnelly – For service to the Parliament of Tasmania.
- Dr Karen Jean Douglas-Make – For service to medicine as a general practitioner, and to the community.
- David John Downie – For service to the community of Campbell Town.
- Daniel Hyam Dreyfus – For service to the community through charitable organisations.
- Philip John Driscoll – For service to sport through medical roles.
- Associate Professor Jill Christine Duncan – For service to tertiary education, and to people with disability.
- Cheryl Marie Dunn – For service to nursing.
- Matthew Charles Ebden – For service to sport as a gold medallist at the Paris Olympic Games 2024.
- Celia Egerton – For service to music through teaching.
- Dr Michael Anthony Ewing – For service to conservation and the environment, and to primary industry.
- Colonel Graham Victor Ferguson – For service to veterans and their families.
- Raymond Eric Fisher – For service to the road transport industry.
- David Robert Fitzgerald – For service to the wool industry, and to the community of Leonora.
- Lynette Foley – For service to swimming as an official and administrator.
- Noemie Eva Fox – For service to sport as a gold medallist at the Paris Olympic Games 2024.
- Peta Lorraine Freeman – For service to sport, and to the community.
- Vivienne Fried – For service to the community, particularly through charitable organisations.
- Thomas James Gallagher – For service to sport as a gold medallist at the Paris Paralympic Games 2024.
- Wendy Gambling – For service to netball as an administrator.
- Dr Margaret Anne Garde – For service to medicine, particularly through education.
- Alice Jemima Mary Garrett – For service to journalism.
- Charles John Garwood – For service to the community, and to emergency response organisations.
- David John Gatenby – For service to the community of Tasmania.
- Gary Lex Gibson – For service to veterans, and to the community.
- Alan Keith Gilmour – For service to the arts, particularly through music.
- The late Craig Anthony Glennon – For service to tennis as an official and administrator.
- The late Peter Edward Greed – For service to the community of the Mildura and Mallee regions, and to the arts.
- Kathleen Mary Guerin – For service to Catholic secondary education.
- Thomas John Gustard – For service to rugby league as a referee.
- Dr Graeme Burslem Gwilliam – For service to engineering, and to the community.
- Elizabeth Habermann – For service to the community of South Australia.
- Patricia Jean-Marie Hadley – For service to the community of Narrabri.
- Julia Clare Hales – For service to people with disability, and to the arts.
- Beryl Edith Haley – For service to the community of the Gulgong region.
- Pamela Joyce Hamilton-Smith – For service to basketball as a coach and player.
- Pho Quang Hang – For service to the Chinese community of Australia.
- John Patrick Hawkins – For service to the community of Western Australia, and to primary industry.
- John Eric Head – For service to the arts, and to the community of Shepparton.
- Neil Harold Heatley – For service to the community of northern Melbourne.
- Phillip John Helmore – For service to naval architecture.
- William Henderson – For service to football.
- Julie Ellen Hermansen – For service to community health, particularly through dyslexia support.
- The late David Hewitson – For service to football as an administrator.
- Wayne John Hinton – For service to Australian rules football as an umpire.
- Margaret Elizabeth Hoban – For service to the arts, particularly through music.
- Timothy Jack Hodge – For service to sport as a gold medallist at the Paris Paralympic Games 2024.
- Phyllis Diana Hopf – For service to the community of Goomeri.
- John Leonard Hough – For service to veterans.
- Gregory Carl Hoving – For service to veterans.
- John Franklin Ingham – For service to broadcast media.
- Hassan Iskandar – For service to taekwondo.
- Shayna Louise Jack – For service to sport as a gold medallist at the Paris Olympic Games 2024.
- Robert Jackman – For service to competitive scrabble.
- Barry William Jansen – For service to cricket.
- Benjamin Charles Johnson – For service to social welfare.
- Laura-Jude Johnson – For service to community mental health, and to youth advocacy.
- The late Paul Robert Johnson – For service to aged welfare.
- Natasha Leila Johnston – For service to the community through drought relief.
- Brian Johnstone – For service to the community, and to people with disability.
- Elizabeth Clare Jones – For service to the community through a range of roles.
- Geoffrey Paul Jones – For service to business, and to the entertainment industry.
- The late Roslyn May Jones – For service to the community of Coomalie Shire.
- Dr Harley Shields Juffs – For service to the community through a range of roles.
- Irene Tomi Kalinski – For service to the Jewish community of Melbourne.
- Dr Justijana Katerinskaja – For service to social welfare.
- Robert Allan Katz – For service to judo.
- The late Yvonne Keegan – For service to the community of Orange.
- Nina Kennedy – For service to sport as a gold medallist at the Paris Olympic Games 2024.
- Associate Professor Zuleyha Keskin – For service to the Islamic community of Australia.
- Sukhjit Kaur Khalsa – For service to the performing arts.
- Stephen Allen Kip – For service to the construction industry.
- Roslyn Jane Knights – For service to the community of Kyogle.
- Brian Malcolm Knill – For service to conservation and the environment.
- Aysegul Koksuz – For service to the Turkish community of Victoria through volunteer roles.
- Margaret Soo Koo – For service to the creative arts, particularly as an embroiderer.
- Neville Raymond Kschenka – For service to local government, and to the community of Narrandera.
- Peter Lane – For service to youth, and to the community.
- Wendy Ellen Lane – For service to youth, and to the community.
- Dr Catherine Anne Lawrence – For service to tertiary education.
- Francine Lazarus – For service to the Jewish community.
- Hong-Phong Le – For service to the Vietnamese community of Australia.
- Lan Le – For service to the Crown, and to the community of South Australia.
- Conor Gerard Leahy – For service to sport as a gold medallist at the Paris Olympic Games 2024.
- Alexa Leary – For service to sport as a gold medallist at the Paris Paralympic Games 2024.
- Dr Emma Lee – For service to the Indigenous community of Tasmania.
- Barry Graham Lemcke – For service to the livestock industry.
- Barrie Leonard Littlefield – For service to community health.
- John William Lloyd – For service to the community of Sherbrooke.
- The late Ronald Alan Lord – For service to football.
- Dennis Geoffrey Lowder – For service to veterans, and to the community of Wee Waa.
- David Peter Luck – For service to people with a disability.
- The late Roger Irwin Lynch – For service to the community of the Great Lakes region.
- Alison Mary Macgregor – For service to music, and to horticulture.
- Jim Magee – For service to local government, and to the community of Glen Eira.
- Gregory Alan Mair – For service to public administration in Western Australia.
- Graham Edward Mapri – For service to sport in the Brisbane region.
- Patricia Anne Marsh – For service to the community, particularly women and youth.
- Kay Elizabeth Martin – For service to the communities of Merbein, Mildura and Mallee.
- Associate Professor Marietta Martinovic – For service to social welfare, and to criminology.
- Lynette Maskell – For service to the community of the Brighton region.
- John Richard Mason – For service to the community of Millthorpe.
- Kleoniki Matziaris-Garay – For service to the Greek community of Victoria.
- Patrick John McCluskey – For service to the manufacturing industry.
- Cameron James McEvoy – For service to sport as a gold medallist at the Paris Olympic Games 2024.
- Geoffrey Bruce McFarlane – For service to conservation and the environment.
- Melissa Anne McGuinness – For service to the community, particularly youth.
- The late Adam Glen McKay – For service to basketball, and to the community.
- Judith Patricia McKee – For service to the community of Melbourne.
- Madonna Ellen McKenna – For service to netball as an administrator, and to the community.
- Robert William McLauchlan – For service to architecture, and to social welfare.
- Gerard Joseph McMillan – For service to the community, and to business.
- Deborah Rae Mellett – For service to the Indigenous community of Victoria.
- Sean Sidney Meltzer – For service to the Jewish community, and to the arts.
- Vivian Martin Meredith – For service to rugby league as an administrator.
- Christine Ann Miles – For service to netball as an administrator.
- Janine Margaret Molloy – For service to swimming as an official and administrator.
- Emeritus Professor Anthony Ronald Moon – For service to tertiary education.
- Nellie Beatrice Mooney – For service to the Indigenous community of the Shoalhaven region.
- Bassilios Aziz Morcos – For service to the community of Brimbank.
- Jan Morland – For service to equestrian sports.
- Paul Anthony Moules – For service to the community of the Liverpool Plains
- Sean Andrew Mulqueen – For service to veterans and their families.
- Albert John Myers – For service to community health, and to children.
- The late Eunice Napanangka Jack – For service to Indigenous arts.
- Patricia Maree Nicholls – For service to basketball as a statistician.
- Amanda Noffs – For service to youth through health programs.
- Kelland Michael O'Brien – For service to sport as a gold medallist at the Paris Olympic Games 2024.
- Terence Anthony O'Hara – For service to the community through a range of organisations.
- Stevan John Ober – For service to the community, particularly through First Nations health.
- Jocelyn Osmond – For service to the community of Albury.
- The late Peter William Owens – For service to the community through emergency response organisations.
- Catherine Jane Palethorpe – For service to music administration.
- Lani Glen Pallister – For service to sport as a gold medallist at the Paris Olympic Games 2024.
- Lauren Parker – For service to sport as a gold medallist at the Paris Paralympic Games 2024.
- Clinical Associate Professor Robert Francis Parkyn – For service to medicine in the field of breast and endocrine surgery.
- Wendy Ann Paterson – For service to community health.
- Cheryle Gaye Pedler – For service to the community through a range of roles and organisations.
- John Peers – For service to sport as a gold medallist at the Paris Olympic Games 2024.
- Joan Pellegrino – For service to the Italian community of southwestern Sydney.
- Cecilia Jane Pemberton – For service to community health as a speech pathologist.
- Jamie Perkins – For service to sport as a gold medallist at the Paris Olympic Games 2024.
- Brenton Harold Perks – For service to horse racing, and to business.
- Carol Ann Peterson – For service to youth, particularly through Girl Guides.
- Rodney William Philp – For service to community sporting organisations.
- Dr Samantha Pillay – For service to urology.
- Gianfranco Placanica – For service to the Italian community of Sydney.
- Professor Emerita Margaret Plant – For service to visual arts, and to art history.
- Carmen Platt (Spiers) – For service to the community through charitable organisations.
- Clare Elizabeth Polkinghorne – For service to football.
- The late Barry John Priori – For service to people who are deaf or hard of hearing.
- The Reverend Josephine Margaret Pyecroft – For service to the Anglican Church of Australia.
- Giuseppe Leo Radici – For service to the Italian community of Western Australia.
- Lawrence Edward Raftery – For service to rugby league.
- The late Robin Kenneth Randall – For service to the community through emergency response organisations.
- Jacques Bernard Reymond – For service to the hospitality industry.
- Neil Alexander Robertson – For service to snooker.
- James Francis Rodgers – For service to primary and secondary education, and to cricket.
- Francis James Rodriguez – For service to the community of the Wyndham East Kimberley Shire.
- Paul John Rowlandson – For service to surveying.
- Graham Michael Rudd – For service to veterans.
- Angela Maree Russell – For service to nursing.
- Saya Sakakibara – For service to sport as a gold medallist at the Paris Olympic Games 2024.
- Keith Sawdy – For service to architecture, and to the community.
- John Henry Saxon – For service to science, particularly deep space tracking and exploration.
- Gary Schickerling – For service to cricket.
- The late Gunther Eugen Schmida – For service to wildlife photography.
- Colonel Francis Peter Scott, DSO – For service to veterans and their families.
- The late Neville Gordon Seymour – For service to the community of the Upper Murray region.
- The late Dr Patrick John Shanahan – For service to dentistry.
- Dr Sunila Arvind Shrivastava – For service to the Indian community of Victoria.
- Royce Michael Simmons – For service to rugby league as a player and coach.
- Callum Simpson – For service to sport as a gold medallist at the Paris Paralympic Games 2024.
- The late Mary Therese Simpson – For service to the community of East Melbourne.
- Vlastislav Pavel Skvaril – For service to the community through charitable organisations.
- Barbara Diane Smith – For service to business, and to the community.
- Beverley Ann Smith – For service to the museums and galleries sector.
- Gavin James Smith – For service to conservation, and to the community.
- The late Peter Thomas Smith – For service to the community of Inner West Sydney.
- Timothy Fitz-John Smith – For service to secondary and vocational education.
- Gerald Leslie Snowden – For service to the community, particularly through philanthropy.
- Peter George Squires – For service to community history.
- Janice Anne Standen – For service to grandcarers, and to grandchildren.
- Ian Douglas Stanistreet – For service to broadcast media.
- Lisa Stephan – For service to the German community of Canberra.
- Keira Kristina Stephens – For service to sport as a gold medallist at the Paris Paralympic Games 2024.
- Peter John Stratford – For service to the community of Geraldton.
- Tessa Sullivan – For service to the community through a range of organisations.
- Helga Svendsen – For service to the community through a range of leadership roles.
- Rosslyn Mackenzie Sweetapple – For service to community history.
- Denise Mary Talbot – For service to the community, and to women.
- Alice Tay – For service to the community of the Australian Capital Territory.
- Robert Thompson – For service to the community of Mornington Island.
- Abla Tohamy Kadous – For service to the Muslim community of Australia.
- The Venerable Heather Toon – For service to the Anglican Church of Australia.
- Rodney Glenn Towney – For service to the Indigenous community of New South Wales.
- Huong Thuy Tran – For service to the Vietnamese community of Australia.
- Allan John Tranter – For service to outdoor education, and to the community.
- Pamela Ann Tranter – For service to the community of Redland City.
- Tanya Trevisan – For service to architecture, and to business.
- Arisa Trew – For service to sport as a gold medallist at the Paris Olympic Games 2024.
- Gerard William Tyrrell – For service to veterans, and to military history preservation.
- Kelli Louise Underwood – For service to broadcast media.
- Pamela Anne Valentine – For service to the community of Liverpool.
- Debbie Lee Van Corler – For service to the community through charitable contributions.
- Rosa Vasseghi – For service to multicultural affairs.
- The late Frances Lavinia Wager – For service to the community through a range of organisations.
- Jennifer Marian Waldron – For service to veterans.
- Dr Colin George Walker – For service to avian veterinary science, and to pigeon racing.
- The late Eric John Waller – For service to rowing.
- Judith Anne Walsh – For service to the community of the Mornington Peninsula.
- Brooke Melissa Wardana – For service to early childhood education.
- Alan James Wardrope – For service to the film and motion picture industry.
- Edna May Watson – For service to the Indigenous community of New South Wales.
- Samuel Luke Welsford – For service to sport as a gold medallist at the Paris Olympic Games 2024.
- Adele Dorothy Whalen – For service to athletics through administrative roles.
- Christine Constance Wheal – For service to the community of Barwon Heads.
- John Anthony Wheal – For service to the community of Barwon Heads.
- Judith Atala Whiting – For service to lawn bowls.
- Kendall Louise Whyte – For service to the community through mental health initiatives.
- Alfred Neil Wilkinson – For service to the communities of the Fleurieu Peninsula and Barossa Valley.
- Nanette Williams – For service to the community of the Pilbara.
- Sharon Williams – For service to business, and to the community.
- Lieutenant Colonel Richard Joseph Woodburn – For service to the community through a range of organisations.
- Marion Woodward – For service to the community, and to agriculture.
- Martin Wren – For service to people with disability.
- Arthur Barrie Wrigglesworth – For service to cricket.
- Olivia Clare Wunsch – For service to sport as a gold medallist at the Paris Olympic Games 2024.
- Marten Jan Wynd – For service to youth.
- Sally Ann Wynd – For service to youth.
- Graeme Anthony Wynn – For service to rugby league as a player, coach, and administrator.
- Amanda Joy Young – For service to youth, and to the community.

==== Military Division ====
Navy

- Commander Luke Kenneth Andrews, RAN – For meritorious performance of duty as a Navy Legal Officer.
- Commander Sandra Lee-Joy Bennett, RAN – For meritorious service as a legal officer in the Royal Australian Navy in sensitive and strategic legal case management roles.
- Lieutenant Commander Scott William Clarke, RAN – For meritorious service to the Royal Australian Navy in the field of Human Resource Management.
- Chief Petty Officer Michael John Cunnington – For meritorious performance of duty in the field of Navy Seamanship, Boarding Operations and Gunnery.
- Captain Douglas John Griffiths, RAN – For meritorious service to international engagement for the Australian Defence Force.
- Petty Officer Genene Maria Sanders – For meritorious service to the Royal Australian Navy in the field of hospitality and support services.

Army

- Warrant Officer Class One Jo-Anne Michelle Downes – For meritorious service to leadership and training as the Regimental Sergeant Major of the Army Logistic Training Centre, 13th Brigade and the 3rd Combat Service Support Battalion.
- Warrant Officer Class One Mark Roy Everingham – For meritorious service in Regimental Sergeant Major appointments with the 22nd Engineer Regiment, Joint Task Unit 629.2.1 and the 1st Combat Engineer Regiment.
- Warrant Officer Class One P – For meritorious performance of duty within Special Operations Command as the Command Chief Clerk and Army People Capability Branch as the Warrant Officer Personnel Policy.
- Warrant Officer Class One Peter Anthony Wall – For meritorious service as the Command Chief Clerk of Forces Command and as a Standards Warrant Officer (Command Support Clerk) at Army School of Ordnance.

Air Force

- Warrant Officer Gary John Anderson – For meritorious service to the Australian Defence Force in joint leadership roles.
- Group Captain John Sidney Price (Retd) – For meritorious service as an Inquiry Officer and facilitator of the administrative inquiry capability in the Royal Australian Air Force.

==== General Division – Honorary ====
- Alan Gillott – For service to golf, and to women's sport.
- Selba Mtendere Luka – For service to the African community of Victoria.
- Annamaria Rachele Wood – For service to people with disability.

== Meritorious Service ==
=== Public Service Medal (PSM) ===
Public Service Medal ribbon

Federal

- Mark Barry Alcock – For outstanding public service in maritime affairs to Australia, neighbouring countries and the international maritime community.
- Emma Margaret Gleeson – For outstanding public service in the development and implementation of the Australia Government's response to the Fair Work Commission's historic Aged Care Work Value Case.
- Frederick William Hunter – For outstanding public service in protecting the natural and cultural heritage of the Kakadu National Park.
- Cassandra May Ireland – For outstanding public service in the delivery of significant legislative reform and legal services within the Australian Government.
- Dr Ralph King – For outstanding public service as ambassador to Israel during the current Middle East crisis.
- Tracie-Ann Maher – For outstanding public service in risk management across the Australian public sector.
- Luke Mansfield – For outstanding public service through advocacy to disability reform.
- Jodie Kym McEwan – For outstanding public service in significant policy and legislative reform at the Australian Federal Police.
- Anne Frances McFall – For outstanding public service in support of Australia's higher education sector.
- Donna Michele Ross – For outstanding public service to public administration in the Australian Taxation Office and the wider Australian public sector in particular during the COVID-19 pandemic.
- Dr Victoria Regina Ross – For outstanding public service to public health within the Australian health system and the Australian Defence Force.
- Edward Andrew Russell – For outstanding public service as Australia's representative in conflict zones during the Israel-Hamas conflict.
- Susan Marie Saunders – For outstanding public service in innovation, service delivery and outstanding leadership through the development and implementation of the Fair Entitlements Guarantee Act 2012.
- Gabrielle Tramby – For outstanding public service in global customs practices for the economic and security benefit of Australia both domestically and internationally.
- Dyung Van Dartel – For outstanding public service in budget costings and the development of polices to support Australia's most vulnerable people.
- Sarah Kate Vandenbroek – For outstanding public service in rebuilding trust and fostering productive relations between the Australian Government and the Norfolk Island community.
- Dr Brett Darren Yeomans – For outstanding public service to industry and Australia's start-up ecosystem.

New South Wales

- Berindah Anak Aicken – For outstanding public service to NSW Corrective Services.
- William Robert Birch – For outstanding public service to local government and economic development in the Narrabri Shire.
- Bernard Carlon – For outstanding public service to NSW in the area of road safety and sustainability.
- Susan Crocetti – For outstanding public service to marine wildlife protection and conservation in NSW.
- Lindy Joy Deitz – For outstanding public service to NSW local government in the city of Campbelltown and surrounding region.
- Peter Gainsford – For outstanding public service to local government in Sydney's Inner West.
- Jill Kristin Ludford – For outstanding public service to NSW Health in the Murrumbidgee region.
- Janelle Lesley Lynes – For outstanding public service to multicultural public education in NSW.
- Daniel John Maddedu – For outstanding public service to NSW health policy reform and implementation.
- Kim Olesen – For outstanding public service to the South Eastern Sydney Local Health District particularly in responding to the COVID-19 pandemic.
- Sharon Smith – For outstanding public service to NSW health particularly in responding to the COVID-19 pandemic.
- Sharon Joanne Stewart (Neville) – For outstanding public service to NSW in the delivery of criminalistics services.
- Michelle Rae Tregoning – For outstanding public service to NSW in the delivery of mathematics education in public schools.

Victoria

- Marcia Francene Armstrong – For outstanding public service in maternal and child health service delivery during the COVID-19 pandemic.
- Rena De Francesco – For outstanding public service in organisational reform to better respond to sexual and family violence and support gender equality.
- Lisa Marie Jackson – For outstanding public service in emergency management.
- Mark Johnstone – For outstanding public service in financial policy and economic reform.
- Kirsty Savage – For outstanding public service to the Aboriginal community and delivery of projects.
- Dr Karen Sutherland – For outstanding public service in the protection of vulnerable children and families.
- Dr Paul Bernard Thornton-Smith – For outstanding public service in electoral research and legislation.
- Sharyn Marie Williams – For outstanding public service in the agricultural sector and supporting Victoria's rural regions.
- Luke Cameron Wilson – For outstanding public service in the advocacy and support of regional communities during the COVID-19 pandemic.

Queensland

- Alister Cullen – For outstanding public service to the Indigenous community and business engagement in Queensland.
- Dr Keith Graham, OAM – For outstanding public service in leading Queensland and national school sports recovery in response to the COVID-19 pandemic.
- Belinda Lewis – For outstanding public service to public health policy and program delivery in Queensland's health sector.
- David John Mackie – For outstanding public service to public sector administration and policy reforms in Queensland.
- Deidre Ann Mulkerin – For outstanding public service to child protection, women's equity and disability services.
- Silvio Giovanni Trinca – For outstanding public service to local government infrastructure and disaster recovery.
- Gerald Paul Turpin – For outstanding public service to Ethnobotany and championing Indigenous science and research.

Western Australia

- Nayantara Gupta – For outstanding public service in developing legislation for children's rights and wellbeing.
- John Marrapodi – For outstanding public service in managing natural disasters, security threats and emergencies for the Department of Education.
- Andrew John Pyke – For outstanding public service through strategic leadership and operational activities that have developed the road network and expanded the mining activity in the Pilbara.

South Australia

- Kerry Beck – For outstanding public service in social justice, child protection and family services.
- Adam James Reid – For outstanding public service in industry development and economic growth.
- Panagiotis (Peter) Tsokas – For outstanding public service in local government leading the City of Unley in strategic and environmental planning and reform.

Tasmania

- Warwick Brennan – For outstanding public service to public sector communications, particularly emergency and incident management communications in both Tasmania and New South Wales.
- Ingrid Ganley – For outstanding public service in improving the lives of people with disability in Tasmania.
- Catherine McDonald – For outstanding public service to the Tasmanian community, particularly those who are vulnerable and in financial distress or facing hardship.
- Simon Thomas Roberts – For outstanding public service to policy development and implementation in security and emergency management.

Australian Capital Territory

- Jantiena Anne Batt – For outstanding public service in improving access and equity in education in the ACT.
- Elizabeth Hall – For outstanding public service leading the ACT Government's Budget Coordination function during COVID-19.
- Rebecca Kate Kelley – For outstanding public service to the ACT sport and recreation sector during the COVID-19 pandemic.
- Elizabeth Lopa – For outstanding public service to improve the delivery of health services to the Canberra community and the region.
- Frank Marando – For outstanding public service in executive support and Ministerial services during the COVID-19 pandemic and 2019–20 bushfire season.
- Christopher Brian Roberts – For outstanding public service in establishing an emissions-based registration system for light vehicles in the ACT.
- Jennifer Maree Sloane – For outstanding public service during the ACT Government's COVID-19 public health response.

Northern Territory

- Robert William Creek – For outstanding public service to the Northern Territory public sector.
- Cindy-Lee McDonald – For outstanding public service to the Northern Territory's emergency management response to the COVID-19 pandemic.
- Susan Elizabeth Trimble – For outstanding public service to the education sector in the Northern Territory.

=== Australian Police Medal (APM) ===
Australian Police Medal ribbon

Federal

- Detective Superintendent Marie Elizabeth Andersson
- Craig Mann
- Assistant Commissioner Alison Margaret Wegg

New South Wales

- Chief Inspector Andrew John Bullock
- Sergeant Matthew James Cavanagh
- Detective Chief Inspector Craig Anthony James
- Chief Inspector Peter Joseph Jenkins
- Detective Inspector Joseph Paul Maree
- Inspector Helen Therese McWilliam
- Detective Sergeant Ellen Quinn
- Senior Sergeant Brook Robert Russell

Victoria

- The late Senior Sergeant James Thomas Egan
- Superintendent Kelvin John Gale
- Detective Senior Sergeant Tracy Elizabeth Meyer
- Senior Sergeant Rodney James Munro
- Detective Inspector Anthony Philip Wheatfill

Queensland

- Chief Inspector Gai Bolderrow
- Detective Sergeant Stuart Andrew Butler
- Detective Senior Sergeant Brett Russell Devine
- Senior Sergeant Jacinta Maree Pannowitz
- Superintendent Glen Edward Pointing
- Senior Sergeant Constance Jean Steel
- Assistant Commissioner Christopher John Stream

Western Australia

- Commander Michael James Bell
- Detective Senior Sergeant Stephen John Cleal
- Inspector Jodie Lee Di Lallo
- Detective Superintendent John Andrew Hutchison

South Australia

- Senior Sergeant First Class Sandra Joy Daly
- Senior Constable Lynette Anne Gibson
- Superintendent Mark Christopher Syrus

Tasmania

- Inspector Brenda Louise Orr
- Inspector Matthew Peter Richman

Northern Territory

- Senior Sergeant Stefan Vilhelm Herold
- Senior Constable Ian John Spilsbury

=== Australian Fire Service Medal (AFSM) ===
Australian Fire Service Medal ribbon

- Scott Alexander Campbell
- Samuel Stuart Clark, AM
- Anthony Clough
- Robert James Conroy
- Jennifer Ann Farrell
- John Duncan Hedley
- Gregory Reuben Houston
- Wayne Robert Keel
- Samuel James Parkhouse
- Garry James Reardon
- Robyn Leslie Reynolds

Victoria

- Diana Luen Billingsley
- Peter Vincent Brick
- Fiona Vivienne Burns
- Mark Andrew Gunning
- Lisa Ann Hicks
- Mark Geoffrey King
- Benjamin David Schmidt
- Timothy Philip Smith
- Murray John Talbot
- Jonathon Richard Wood

Queensland

- David Brian Brazel
- Andrew James Houley
- Christopher David Markwell
- Mark Andrew Sellin
- Terrence George Whitehead

Western Australia

- Gyula Bogar
- Michael Anthony Johnston
- Murray Donald Mitchell

South Australia

- Charles Samuel Thomas

Tasmania

- Kathryn Elizabeth Gillham
- Adam William Jones
- Andrew James Skelly

Northern Territory

- Jamie Patrick Seib

=== Ambulance Service Medal (ASM) ===
Ambulance Service Medal ribbon

New South Wales

- Ellen Majella Davies
- Superintendent Paul John Kernick
- Christopher Valan Wilkinson, BM

Victoria

- Dr David John Anderson
- Narelle Capp
- Josephine Leah O'Doherty
- Stephen Thomas Ralph
- Edward John Wright
- Bartholomew Wunderlich

Queensland

- William Douglas Buchanan
- Vaughan Alexander Mason

Western Australia

- Ralph Leslie Briggs
- Nicholas John Chadbourne
- Luke Wayne Fowles
- Blaise Warren Rego

South Australia

- Anthony Willam Clark
- John Stuart Simpson

Northern Territory

- Antoni John Kwiatkowski

=== Emergency Services Medal (ESM) ===
Emergency Services Medal ribbon

New South Wales

- Anthony Gerard Battam
- Christine Speer
- Daniel John Van Keimpema
- Michael Anthony Wasley
- Julie Ann Wilcox

Victoria

- Irene Mary Cracknell, OAM
- Michael John Delanis
- Donald Leslie Harrison, OAM
- Dr Anthony Neil Hodder
- Peter John Weeks, OAM

Western Australia

- Leonie Gwendoline Briggs
- Ronald Arnold Davey
- Grant Alan Pipe
- Mark Kenneth Regel, APM

South Australia

- Darryl Clifford Wright

Tasmania

- Bianca Janelle Callinan
- Paul James Le Fevre
- Curtis Ian Salter

=== Australian Corrections Medal (ACM) ===
Australian Corrections Medal ribbon

New South Wales

- David Archer
- Samah Hasham
- Darren Wayne Kearney
- Japjeet Kaur Prior
- Peter Tran
- Kim Louise Vodic

Victoria

- Rebecca Trudy Linnett
- Mark Thomas Nestor
- Tanya Angela Zita

Queensland

- Susan Gay Burley
- John Wesley Rowan
- Lauren Maree Thompson

Western Australia

- Olivia Louise Byrne
- Sean Thomas Devereux
- Ian Malcolm Farrall
- Leonie Anne Sinclair
- Larry Stephen Smith

South Australia

- Matthew Staples

Tasmania

- Alison Ann McIntyre

Australian Capital Territory

- Gary Ian Hamblin

=== Australian Intelligence Medal (AIM) ===
Australian Intelligence Medal ribbon

- Hazel Bennett
- Geoff G
- Stephen McGlynn
- Jonathan Olrick
- Michael Tink
- Kristin W

== Distinguished and Conspicuous Service ==
=== Distinguished Service Medal (DSM) ===
Distinguished Service Medal ribbon

Army

- Brigadier James Guthrie Hunter, CSC – For distinguished leadership in warlike operations as the Commander Australian Contingent for Operations OKRA and STEADFAST and Combined Joint Task Force – Operation INHERENT RESOLVE Plans Officer from December 2022 to December 2023.

=== Commendation for Distinguished Service ===
Commendation for Distinguished Service ribbon

Army

- Colonel Geoffrey Neil Costello – For distinguished performance of duty in warlike operations in Iraq as the Chief of Operations for the North Atlantic Treaty Organisation Mission – Iraq from May to November 2023.
- Lieutenant Colonel Gerald Murray McGowan – For distinguished performance of duty in warlike operations in Iraq as the Deputy Director of Plans for Headquarters Combined Joint Task Force – Operation INHERENT RESOLVE and as the Deputy Commander of the Australian Contingent from August 2022 to March 2023.

=== Conspicuous Service Cross (CSC) ===
Conspicuous Service Cross ribbon

Navy

- Warrant Officer Phillip John Durnan, CSM – For outstanding devotion to duty as the Command Warrant Officer HMAS Coonawarra.
- Commander Nikola Celeste-Marie Ford, RAN – For outstanding achievement as the Maritime Logistics Officer in HMAS Adelaide.
- Warrant Officer Stuart Noel Hammond – For outstanding devotion to duty in the field of catering services especially in training and policy development.
- Captain Matthew Dean Hoffman, RAN – For outstanding devotion to duty as Director Undersea and Information Warfare Workforce Development.
- Principal Chaplain Andrew John Lewis, RAN – For outstanding devotion to duty as the Director General Chaplaincy – Navy.
- Captain Antony Dionisio Pisani, RAN – For outstanding achievement in the field of Navy Capability.
- Commander Matthew Eric Ryall, RAN – For outstanding achievement as the Commander Australian Contingent for Operation MANITOU from January 2023 to January 2024.
- Leading Seaman Ernesto De Joya Sanchez Jr – For outstanding achievement in imagery and public affairs over multiple regional presence deployments in HMAS Arunta, Ballarat, Supply, and Toowoomba from 2020 to 2023.
- Commodore Nigel Justin Smith, RAN – For outstanding achievement as the Director General Guided Weapons and Explosive Ordnance Enterprise Task Force and the Director General Manufacturing Development.
- Commander Calvin Lindsey Timms, RAN – For outstanding achievement as the Commanding Officer HMAS Waller on Operation VIGILANCE from June to September 2023.

Army

- Lieutenant Colonel D – For outstanding achievement as the Commander of Support and Response Team – Europe Rotation 5 over the period July 2023 to January 2024.
- Colonel Jacqueline Louise Costello – For outstanding achievement in the health field as Staff Officer Grade One Psychology and the Senior Health Officer within Headquarters Forces Command.
- Lieutenant Colonel Susana Fernandez – For outstanding achievement as Commander Joint Task Unit 629.1.1 during Operation NSW FLOOD ASSIST 2021-1 and Operation FLOOD ASSIST 2022-1 from March 2021 to March 2023.
- Lieutenant Colonel Hugh Michael Grogan – For outstanding achievement in enhancing Australian Defence Force preparedness planning and governance.
- Brigadier Damian John Hill, AM – For outstanding achievement as the Director General Joint Collective Training, Headquarters Joint Operations Command.
- Brigadier Nerolie Irene McDonald – For outstanding devotion to duty as Director General Pacific and Timor-Leste.

Air Force

- Group Captain James William Blagg – For outstanding achievement in Australian Defence Force air capability sustainment contracting.
- Air Commodore Anthony Phillip Jones (Retd) – For outstanding achievement in the Australian Defence Force as Director of the Indonesia Safety and Airworthiness Program.
- Group Captain Darrell Robert May – For outstanding achievement in space operations in Joint Capabilities Group.
- Wing Commander Lachlan James Melville – For outstanding achievement in leading and managing Australian Defence Force acquisition of Integrated Air and Missile Defence capabilities.
- Wing Commander Jamie Robertson Minor – For outstanding achievement in Australian Defence Force Air Operations planning for Operations BEECH, CARNELIAN and SOUTHERN DISCOVERY from January 2022 to December 2023.
- Wing Commander Benjamin David Sawley – For outstanding achievement as Commanding Officer Number 1 Flying Training School, Royal Australian Air Force.
- Flight Lieutenant Matthew Robert Thurling – For outstanding achievement as the Aeronautical Life Support Mustering Capability Advisor in delivering a transformational change program to create an effective Tri-Service Life Support capability.
- Wing Commander Janine Frances Tillott – For outstanding achievement implementing Gender in Military Operations reform for the Royal Australian Air Force.
- Group Captain David Trevor Torrington – For outstanding achievement in the development and execution of C-27J Spartan operations for the Australian Defence Force.
- Squadron Leader James Alexander Wheeler – For outstanding achievement in enhancing F-35 survivability and F-35 Mission Data collaboration for the Royal Australian Air Force and F-35 Program nations.

=== Bar to the Conspicuous Service Medal (CSM and Bar) ===
Conspicuous Service Medal and Bar ribbon

Navy

- Warrant Officer Mark Daniel Verhoeven, CSM –For meritorious achievement in construction engineering and shipbuilding within the Royal Australian Navy Offshore Patrol Vessel Program.

=== Conspicuous Service Medal (CSM) ===
Conspicuous Service Medal ribbon

Navy

- Leading Seaman L – For meritorious achievement in the provision of Geospatial-Intelligence support to operational design and review of Australian Defence Force joint operations.
- Lieutenant Commander Dean James Dvornicich, RAN – For meritorious achievement as the Marine Engineer Officer HMAS Supply.
- Petty Officer Mark James Leach – For meritorious devotion to duty while deployed on operations in HMAS Farncomb.
- Leading Seaman Katherine Maree Lyon – For meritorious devotion to duty in the field of Fleet Engineering administration.
- Chief Petty Officer Michael Brendon Nowill – For meritorious devotion to duty as an Aviation Technician within the Fleet Air Arm.
- Chief Petty Officer Matthew Lee Ostrowski – For meritorious achievement in support of the Collins Class Submarines.

Army

- Corporal L – For meritorious achievement in the development of Standard Operating Procedures and Training Laboratories in support of the Integrated Battlefield Telecommunications Network Release Three.
- Craftsman N – For meritorious achievement in the application of remarkable judgment in non-warlike situations as a Heavy Marine Maintainer within the 2nd Commando Regiment.
- Major Drew Warwick Burkitt – For meritorious achievement as the Detachment Commander Task Unit Chinook during Operation BUSHFIRE ASSIST 2019/20 from January to February 2020.
- Major Cameron Steven Dunne – For meritorious devotion to duty as the 5th Aviation Regiment CH-47F Chinook helicopter Qualified Flying Instructor.
- Warrant Officer Class One Susan Louise Gallacher – For meritorious devotion to duty in providing transition support to Army's people and their families transitioning from Defence as an Army Transition Warrant Officer.
- Warrant Officer Class One Daniel Johnathan Heller – For meritorious achievement as the Tier A, Aircrew Employment Category Manager of the Army Aviation Training Centre.
- Warrant Officer Class One Craig Allan Hodge – For meritorious achievement as Training Warrant Officer and Acting Regimental Sergeant Major of the 12th/40th Battalion, the Royal Tasmania Regiment.
- Captain Natasha Pauline Kirkham – For meritorious achievement in leadership and strategic engagement while serving as Troop Commander 127th Signal Troop, 1st Signal Regiment.
- Warrant Officer Class Two Andrei Andreyevich Mazourenko – For meritorious achievement as the senior Direct Fire Support Weapons tactician at the School of Infantry, and as a Company Sergeant Major and Operations Warrant Officer at the 2nd Battalion, the Royal Australian Regiment.
- Warrant Officer Class One Lance Ivan Peterson – For meritorious achievement as a senior Warrant Officer and Employment Category Manager in the Groundcrew Mission Support trade in the Australian Army.
- Warrant Officer Class One Shane Robert Smith – For meritorious achievement to the Australian Defence Force in the development and delivery of a framework for armoured vehicle training.
- Major Katelyn Clare Thorne – For meritorious achievement in streamlining operational reporting, systems administration and governance for the United Nations Truce Supervision Organisation on Operation PALADIN from July 2022 to July 2023.

Air Force

- Warrant Officer Rita Diana Coles – For meritorious achievement as the Senior Air Operations and Air Force Liaison Officer, Defence Cooperation Program, Papua New Guinea.
- Squadron Leader Luke Daniel Georgeson – For meritorious achievement in modernising the Royal Australian Air Force Tactical Air Control Party, making significant contributions to evolving Air Force command and control capabilities and enhancing air land integration with the Australian Army.
- Flight Sergeant Peter John Greentree – For meritorious achievement in the application of exceptional skills, judgment and dedication as an Aircraft Technician and Maintenance Executive at Number 36 Squadron.
- Squadron Leader Ryan John Milsop – For meritorious achievement as the Australian Liaison Officer at the United Arab Emirates Air Force Air Warfare Centre, located at Al Dhafra Air Base, United Arab Emirates.
- Wing Commander Brad Anthony Sheldon – For meritorious achievement in the development of the cyber-warfare workforce and the cyber-warfare capability of the Australian Defence Force.
- Corporal Simon Edward Tapply – For meritorious achievement in the enhancement of adversary tactics analysis within the Royal Australian Air Force.
