= Tow (surname) =

- Language: Jewish, Chinese, English

Other names
- Variant forms: Chinese: Tao, Cao, Du; English: Tough, Tulloch, Towe

Tow is a surname in various cultures.

== Origins ==
Tow may be:

- Jewish name Jewish originating from Eastern Europe notably from Talsen, in the Kurland province of former USSR now known as Talsi, Latvia, Hirsch Tow
- A spelling, based on the pronunciations in some varieties of Chinese, of the Chinese surnames romanised in Mandarin Pinyin as Táo (陶), Cáo (曹), or Dù (杜)
- A variant of Tough, which originated both as a nickname (from Middle English togh or tow, "steadfast") and separately as an Anglicisation of the Scottish surname Tulloch. Other variants include Towe.

== Statistics ==
According to statistics cited by Patrick Hanks, 78 people on the island of Great Britain and none on the island of Ireland bore the surname Tow in 2011. In 1881 there had been 148 people with the surname in Great Britain, primarily at Lincolnshire, West Riding of Yorkshire, and Leicestershire.

The 2010 United States census found 1,910 people with the surname Tow, making it the 15,355th-most-common name in the country. This represented an increase in absolute numbers, but a decrease in relative frequency, from 1,893 (14,457th-most-common) in the 2000 Census. In both censuses, about four-fifths of the bearers of the surname identified as White, and between 10% and 15% as Asian.

== People ==
People with the surname Tow include:

- Timothy Tow (杜祥辉; 1920–2009), Singaporean pastor
- Leonard Tow (born 1928), American businessman
- Eng Tow (杜瑛; born 1947), Singaporean artist
- Jeff Tow-Arnett (born 1986), American football fullback
- Matthew J. Tow (fl. 1994–present), Australian singer
- Michael Tow (fl. 2007–present), American actor, director, and producer

== See also ==
- Töws, a German surname
- Isaac N'Tow (born 1994), Ghanaian footballer
