= Towe =

Towe is a given name and surname.

== Given name ==
Towe is an uncommon Swedish feminine given name. From 2004 to 2020, between three and eleven newborn girls in Sweden were given the name Towe each year besides 2007, 2018, and 2019 when two or fewer newborn girls were given the name.

People with this given name include:

- Towe Jaarnek (born 1965), Swedish singer
- Towe Lundman (born 1994), Swedish curler

== Surname ==
As a surname, Towe is a variant of Tough, which originated both as a nickname (from Middle English togh or tow(e), "steadfast") and separately as an Anglicisation of the Scottish surname Tulloch. Other variants include Tow.

According to statistics cited by Patrick Hanks, 225 people on the island of Great Britain and 42 on the island of Ireland bore the surname Towe in 2011. In 1881 there were 90 people with the surname in Great Britain, primarily at Warwickshire, Leicestershire, Staffordshire, and Northumbria. In mid-19th-century Ireland the surname was found primarily at County Antrim. The 2010 United States census found 2,877 people with the surname Towe, making it the 11,051th-most-common name in the country. This represented an increase in absolute numbers, but a decrease in relative frequency, from 2,799 (10,518th-most-common) in the 2000 Census. In both censuses, slightly fewer than nine-tenths of the bearers of the surname identified as White, and about 7% as Black.

People with this surname include:

- Harry Lancaster Towe (1898–1991), American Republican Party politician
- Peter Towe (1922–2015), Canadian diplomat
- Monte Towe (born 1953), American basketball coach
- Matt Towe (born 1988), English ice hockey forward
