= Jaap Dronkers =

Dutch sociologist of education

- Born: 1945; Amsterdam, Netherlands
- Died: March 30, 2016 (aged 70–71)
- Education: Vrije Universiteit Amsterdam
- Scientific career
- Fields: Sociology of education
- Institutions: University of Amsterdam; European University Institute; Maastricht University

Jaap Dronkers (1945 – 30 March 2016) was a Dutch sociologist of education. After studying sociology at Vrije Universiteit Amsterdam in his native Amsterdam, he taught at the Catholic University of Brabant (now Tilburg University) from 1986 to 1990. In 1990, he joined the faculty of the University of Amsterdam, where he remained on the faculty until 2001. He then taught at the European University Institute from 2001 to 2009 before becoming an honorary professor in international comparative research on educational performance and social inequality at the Research Centre for Education and the Labour Market in the University of Maastricht's School for Business and Economics. From its establishment in 1995 till his death, Dronkers was a member of the editorial board of the academic journal Educational Research and Evaluation. He died of a stroke on 30 March 2016.
