= Tow-Arnett =

Tow-Arnett is a surname. Notable people with the surname include:

- Jeff Tow-Arnett (born 1986), American football player
- Jessica Susan Tow-Arnett (born 1986), American volleyball player
