= Marietta Martinovic =

Australian criminologist

Marietta Martinovic OAM
- Known for: Criminology and social justice
- Title: Associate Professor
- Awards: Order of Australia (2025)

Academic background
- Education: RMIT

Academic work
- Discipline: Criminologist
- Institutions: RMIT

Marietta Martinovic is an Australian criminologist and social justice advocate. She currently serves as an associate professor in criminology and justice studies at Royal Melbourne Institute of Technology (RMIT). She was awarded the Medal of the Order of Australia in 2025 for "distinguished service to criminology".

She is the founder of the first Australian Prison exchange program, called Inside-Out, where both incarcerated people and students of RMIT take an elective class and 'learn as equals', and subsequently apply their knowledge, allowing better transitioning into community after prison.

== Early life and education ==
Martinovic moved from Bosnia to Australia at the age of 13, where her family were war refugees due to civil war.

Martinovic has a Bachelor of Arts, a master's degree and a PhD, all from RMIT. She also received the Sir John Minogue Medal. In 2007, she took part in training for the Inside-Out Instructor course, held within the Inside-Out Prison Exchange Program's international headquarters, located in Philadelphia, at Temple University.

== Career ==
Martinovic founded an organisation called Inside Out, where community and incarcerated people attend classes together and brainstorm justice issues. Inside-Out is a prison exchange program where the university students and prisoner's all take part in university-level teaching programs. The program was inspired by the substantial and positive outcomes of the Inside Out program which was conducted at Temple University in Pennsylvania. The programs lead to reports which can then influence prison policy around incarceration.

After prisoners are released from prison, there have been substantial and positive long-term impacts reported as a result of the program, in response to being brought as peers together with the other students, and improved senses of well-being and confidence.

"People stop feeling lonely, they stop feeling worthless. And those are incredibly important qualities for those coming out of custody. You feel your voice matters, your experience matters."

As part of her research on solutions around the increasing populations of people within prisons, she wore an electronic monitoring bracelet.

She has conducted research on prison inmates, and positive empowerment programs, designed to prevent prisoners from returning to criminal activity. Similarly, she was involved in electronic monitoring of returned travellers, quarantining in hotels, or at home wearing electronic monitoring devices, during the Covid pandemic.

== Publications ==
Martinovic has conducted numerous studies on prison life, as well as digital devices in prisons, in addition to conducting meta-analyses on positive improvements on prison life. She has publications on diversity and equity, prison life from a women's viewpoint, university student's and prisoners viewpoints of studying together, as well as a meta-analysis on interventions.

=== Selected articles ===
- Martinovic, Marietta; Liddell, Marg; Muldoon, Shane Douglas (2018-10-03). "Changing views and perceptions: the impact of the Australian Inside-Out Prison Exchange Program on students". Educational Research and Evaluation. 24 (6–7): 437–453. doi:10.1080/13803611.2018.1543051. ISSN 1380-3611.
- Martinovic, Marietta; A'Vard, Tarmi; Antojado, Dwayne (2022). "Bringing Together the Voices of Contemporary Lived Experience through Prison-Based and Community-Based Think-Tanks". Advancing Corrections Journal. 13 (1). International Corrections and Prisons Association: 152–163.

=== Selected chapters ===
- Martinovic, Marietta; Liddell, Marg (2020). Learning behind prison bars: University students and prisoners' experiences of studying together. RMIT University. Scholarship of Teaching and Learning in Criminology. Chapter.

== Media ==
Martinovic has discussed her work on various forms of media including the ABC, discussing the Inside Out program and its impact on prisoners and students, the Castlemaine Mail, on how her teaching of criminology informs policy, as well as on Channel 9, discussing crime rates in youth.

== Awards and honours ==
- 2017 – RMIT Vice Chancellor's award for Educational Partnerships and Collaborations with Other Organisations.
- 2024 – Triple E awards -–Impactful Collaboration of the Year Award.
- 2025 – Australia Day Order of Australia.
