= Tough (surname) =

Tough is an English language surname, with two distinct known origins.

It is predominantly a Scottish name, a toponymic surname ultimately deriving from Scottish Gaelic tulach, "hillock". A variant spelling is Touch. Both are pronounced /tuːx/, tookh: like "took" with a long vowel, the "-gh/-ch" sound the same as in "loch". In 1969, The Scots Magazine suggested the name retained its Scottish pronunciation, particularly the "-ch", due to being "sufficiently localised and un-aristocratic to have missed the application of genteel polish." Patrick Hanks described Tough as a variant of surname Tulloch (from places around Dingwall), while George Fraser Black and David Dobson both wrote that it is a toponymic surname in its own right, from the parish of Tough near Alford, Aberdeenshire. The surname dates to the 14th century in Aberdeenshire, and Dobson noted that it arrived in North America from a transportee in 1652.

It can also be an English name, originating from Middle English togh or tow(e) (Old English tóh) as a byname for someone with characteristics of toughness: Hanks referred to being brave and stubborn, and Mark Antony Lower referred to being sturdy and capable of endurance. Traditionally pronounced /toʊ/, toh (a rhyme with "though"), it also has Tow as a variant spelling; Clive Upton and William A. Kretzschmar Jr. wrote in the 2017 Routledge Dictionary of Pronunciation that the current pronunciation of the non-Scottish surname is /tʌf/, tuhf: that of modern "tough".

== People ==
- Allen Tough (1936–2012), Canadian academic
- Dave Tough (1907–1948), American jazz drummer
- Jenny Tough (born 1989 or 1990), Canadian endurance athlete
- Kathy Tough (born 1969), Canadian volleyball player
- Kelly Tough (b. 1961), Canadian model and actress
- The Krankies, Ian and Janette Tough, Scottish comedy duo
- Lucy Bronze (b. 1991), English footballer
- Paul Tough (born 1967), Canadian writer
- Mike Tough (b. 1967, Dublin), Scottish presenter of music radio
- Kate Tough (b. 1972), Scottish author
