= Sharon Naismith =

Australian clinical neuropsychologist

Sharon Linda Naismith AM FASSA is an Australian clinical neuropsychologist who researches aging, dementia, and cognitive decline. She is the Leonard P. Ullman Chair in Psychology at the University of Sydney School of Psychology. Sharon founded the Healthy Brain Ageing Project in 2010, which focuses on modifiable risk factors for cognitive decline and dementia including depression, sleep disturbance and cardiovascular disease. In 2023, Naismith was elected to the Academy of the Social Sciences in Australia.

Naismith earned a bachelor's degree in psychology and a D.Psych. from Macquarie University. Her 2004 dissertation was titled, Implicit Sequence Learning in Depression Relationship to Neuropsychological, Clinical, Vascular and Genetic Risk Factors. Her dissertation supervisors were Ian Hickie and Edwin Arthur Shores.

Naismith's research focus on aging, dementia, and cognitive decline, particularly modifiable risk factors such as sleep disturbance, is a key part of her career. One project, the REducing Sleep Apnoea for the PrEvention of Dementia (REShAPED) trial, received funding from the National Health and Medical Research Council (NHMRC). This trial investigates the link between sleep apnoea and dementia risk, a significant aspect of her research.

Naismith was appointed a Member of the Order of Australia in the 2025 Australia Day Honours for her "significant service to neuropsychology, particularly dementia, through medical research and clinical practice".

== Selected publications ==
- Naismith, S. L., Duffy, S. L., Cross, N., Grunstein, R., Terpening, Z., Hoyos, C., D'Rozario, A., Lagopoulos, J., Osorio, R. S., Shine, J. M., & McKinnon, A. C. (2020). Nocturnal hypoxemia is associated with altered parahippocampal functional brain connectivity in older adults at risk for dementia. Journal of Alzheimer's Disease, 73(2), 571-584. https://doi.org/10.3233/JAD-190747
- Naismith, S. L., & Mowszowski, L. (2018). Sleep disturbance in mild cognitive impairment: a systematic review of recent findings. Current opinion in psychiatry, 31(2), 153-159.https://doi.org/10.1097/yco.0000000000000397
- Naismith, S. L., Hickie, I. B., Terpening, Z., Rajaratnam, S. W., Hodges, J. R., Bolitho, S., Rogers, N. L., Lewis, S. J. W. (2014). Circadian misalignment and sleep disruption in mild cognitive impairment. Journal of Alzheimer’s Disease, 38(4), 857-866. https://doi.org/10.3233/JAD-131217
- Naismith, S. L., Mowszowski, L., Diamond, K., & Lewis, S. J. (2013). Improving memory in Parkinson's disease: a healthy brain ageing cognitive training program. Movement Disorders, 28(8), 1097-1103. https://doi.org/10.1002/mds.25457
- Naismith, S. L., Hermens, D. F., Ip, T. K. C., Bolitho, S., Scott, E., Rogers, N. L., & Hickie, I. B. (2012). Circadian profiles in young people during the early stages of affective disorder. Translational Psychiatry, 2(5), e123-e123. https://doi.org/10.1038/tp.2012.47
- Naismith, S. L., Norrie, L. M., Mowszowski, L., & Hickie, I. B. (2012). The neurobiology of depression in later-life: clinical, neuropsychological, neuroimaging and pathophysiological features. Progress in neurobiology, 98(1), 99-143. https://doi.org/10.1016/j.pneurobio.2012.05.009
- Naismith, S. L., Diamond, K., Carter, P. E., Norrie, L. M., Redoblado-Hodge, M. A., Lewis, S. J., & Hickie, I. B. (2011). Enhancing memory in late-life depression: the effects of a combined psychoeducation and cognitive training program. The American Journal of Geriatric Psychiatry, 19(3), 240-248. https://doi.org/10.1097/JGP.0b013e3181dba587
- Naismith, S. L., Rogers, N. L., Lewis, S. J., Terpening, Z., Ip, T., Diamond, K., Norrie, L., & Hickie, I. B. (2011). Sleep disturbance relates to neuropsychological functioning in late-life depression. Journal of affective disorders, 132(1-2), 139-145. https://doi.org/10.1016/j.jad.2011.02.027
- Naismith, S. L., Lewis, S. J., & Rogers, N. L. (2011). Sleep-wake changes and cognition in neurodegenerative disease. Progress in brain research, 190, 21-52. https://doi.org/10.1016/B978-0-444-53817-8.00002-5
- Naismith, S. L., Shine, J. M., & Lewis, S. J. (2010). The specific contributions of set‐shifting to freezing of gait in Parkinson's disease. Movement Disorders, 25(8), 1000-1004. https://doi.org/10.1002/mds.23005
- Naismith, S. L., Redoblado-Hodge, M. A., Lewis, S. J., Scott, E. M., & Hickie, I. B. (2010). Cognitive training in affective disorders improves memory: a preliminary study using the NEAR approach. Journal of Affective Disorders, 121(3), 258-262. https://doi.org/10.1016/j.jad.2009.06.028
- Naismith, S. L., Rogers, N. L., Hickie, I. B., Mackenzie, J., Norrie, L. M., Lewis, S. J. G. (2010). Sleep well, think well: Sleep-wake disturbance in mild cognitive impairment. Journal of Geriatric Psychiatry and Neurology, 23(2), 123-130. https://doi.org/10.1177/0891988710363710
- Naismith, S. L., Glozier, N., Burke, D., Carter, P. E., Scott, E., & Hickie, I. B. (2009). Early intervention for cognitive decline: is there a role for multiple medical or behavioural interventions?. Early Intervention in Psychiatry, 3(1), 19-27. https://doi.org/10.1111/j.1751-7893.2008.00102.x
- Naismith, S.L., Longley, W.A., Scott, E.M., & Hickie, I. B. (2007). Disability in major depression related to self-rated and objectively-measured cognitive deficits: a preliminary study. BMC Psychiatry, 7(32), 1-7. https://doi.org/10.1186/1471-244X-7-32
- Naismith, S. L., Hickie, I. B., Ward, P. B., Scott, E., & Little, C. (2006). Impaired implicit sequence learning in depression: a probe for frontostriatal dysfunction? Psychological Medicine, 36(3), 313–323. https://doi.org/10.1017/S0033291705006835
- Naismith, S. L., Winter, V. R., Hickie, I. B., & Cistulli, P. A. (2005). Effect of oral appliance therapy on neurobehavioral functioning in obstructive sleep apnea: a randomized controlled trial. Journal of Clinical Sleep Medicine, 1(04), 374-380. https://doi.org/10.5664/jcsm.26365
- Naismith, S. L., Winter, V., Gotsopoulos, H., Hickie, I. B, & Cistulli, P. (2004). Neurobehavioral Functioning in Obstructive Sleep Apnea: Differential Effects of Sleep Quality, Hypoxemia and Subjective Sleepiness. Journal of Clinical and Experimental Neuropsychology, 26(1), 43–54. https://doi.org/10.1076/jcen.26.1.43.23929
- Naismith, S. L., Hickie, I. B., Turner, K., Little, C. L., Winter, V., Ward, P. B, Wilhelm, K., Mitchell, P., & Parker, G. (2003). Neuropsychological performance in patients with depression is associated with clinical, etiological and genetic risk factors. Journal of clinical and experimental neuropsychology, 25(6), 866-877. https://doi.org/10.1076/jcen.25.6.866.16472
- Naismith, S. L., Hickie, I. B., Ward, P. B., Turner, K., Scott, E., Little, C., Mitchell, P., Wilhelm, K., & Parker, G. (2002). Caudate nucleus volumes and genetic determinants of homocysteine metabolism in the prediction of psychomotor speed in older persons with depression. American Journal of Psychiatry, 159(12), 2096-2098. https://doi.org/10.1176/appi.ajp.159.12.2096
- Naismith, S. L., Hickie, I. B., Scott, E. M., & Davenport, T. A. (2001). Effects of mental health training and clinical audit on general practitioners' management of common mental disorders. Medical Journal of Australia, 175, S42-S47. https://doi.org/10.5694/j.1326-5377.2001.tb143789.x
