= Tulloch =

Tulloch may refer to:

Tulloch is an Irish name, from the Irish 'tulach', meaning "hillock" or "mound".

== People with the surname ==
- Alexander Bruce Tulloch (1838–1920), Major-general in the British Army, author
- Bert Tulloch (1889–1953), English footballer
- Bitsie Tulloch, American actress
- Courtney Tulloch, British gymnast
- Francis Tulloch (born 1940), Jamaican politician
- Ian Tulloch (born 1950), New Zealand politician and racing-driver
- John Tulloch (1823–1886), Scottish theologian
- Jonathan Tulloch, British writer
- Lee Tulloch, Australian journalist and author
- Maurice Tulloch (born 1969), British/Canadian businessman
- Stephen Tulloch, American football player
- Sylvia Tulloch, Australian materials scientist
- William John Tulloch, British bacteriologist

== Transport ==
- Tulloch railway station, in the Highland region of Scotland
- Tulloch Limited, a rolling stock and locomotive builder formerly at Rhodes, Sydney, Australia

== Other uses ==
- Tulloch Castle in Scotland
- Tulloch (horse), New Zealand bred horse who raced in Australia
- Tulloch, Perth and Kinross, an area of Perth, Scotland
- Tulloch, Badenoch and Strathspey, a settlement in Highland, Scotland
- Tulloch, Lochaber, a settlement in Highland, Scotland
