= Adrian Di Marco =

Australian entrepreneur and businessman (born 1958)

Adrian Di Marco OAM
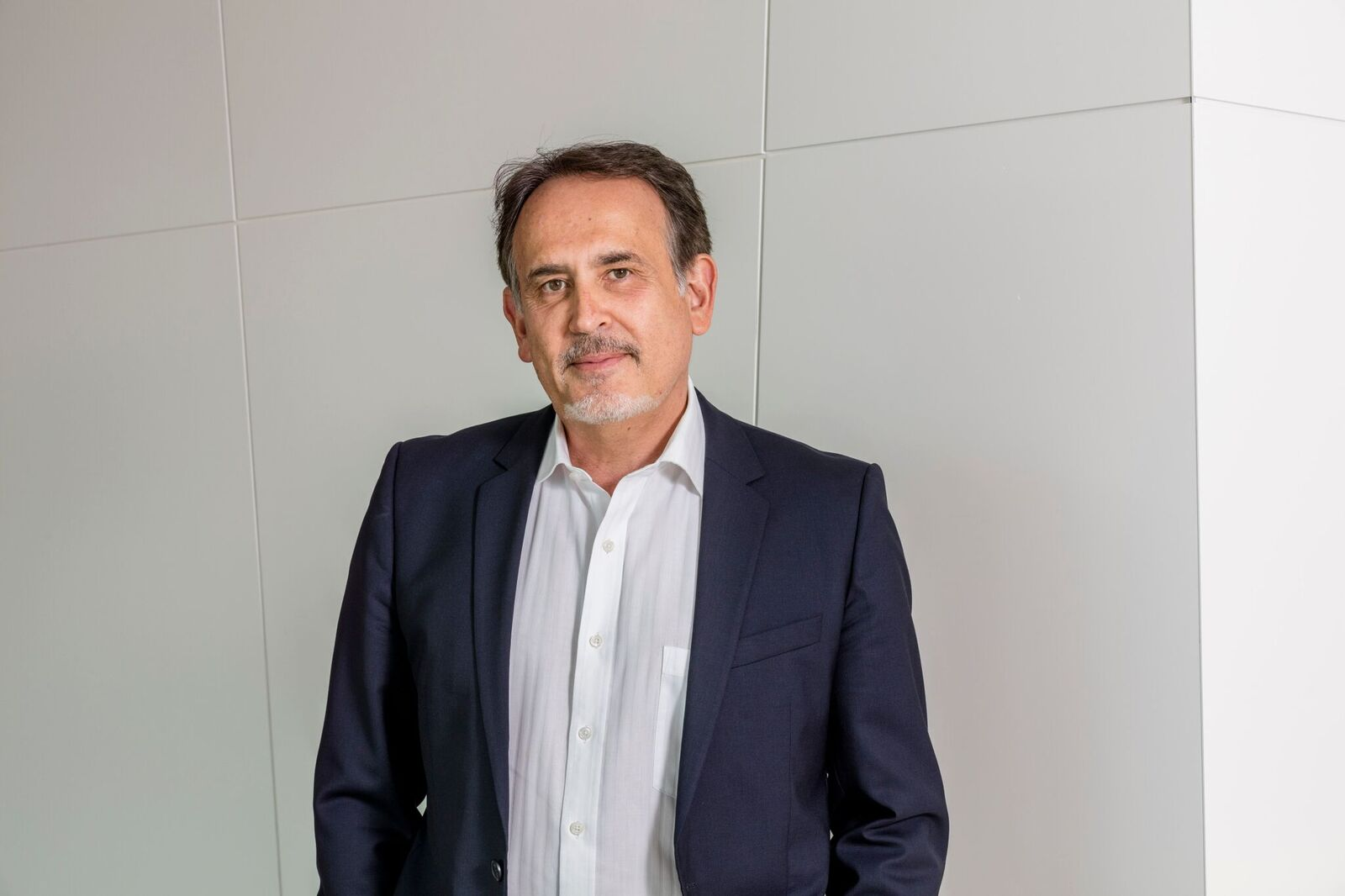
- Adrian Di Marco – Executive chairman TechnologyOne
- Occupation: Executive chairman of TechnologyOne
- Years active: 1987–present
- Known for: Founder of TechnologyOne

Adrian Di Marco (born 1958) is an Australian entrepreneur and businessman. He is the founder and Executive Chairman of TechnologyOne, Australia's largest enterprise software company.

== Early life and career ==
Di Marco was born in Brisbane in 1958, the child of Italian immigrants. He attended St James College in Brisbane.

He became interested in IT after helping his brother, who was studying engineering at university, to program one of the first digital computers. After high school, Di Marco completed a science degree at the University of Queensland, majoring in computer science. Early in his career, he worked at Arthur Andersen (now Accenture).

== TechnologyOne CEO ==
Di Marco founded TechnologyOne from inside a demountable office in the car park at JL Mactaggart Industries' hide processing plant in Hemmant, Brisbane, in 1987. The company initially received with a small amount of capital from JL Mactaggart Industries.

The company began providing financial software, building its products around relational databases. It has since developed enterprise resource planning software for sectors including local government, universities, and hospitals.

In 1998, when Oracle launched a competitor product and revoked TechnologyOne's licenses, Di Marco made the company's products database independent, building its own sales, marketing, and implementation divisions. In December 1999, Di Marco led the company into its listing on the ASX making it one of the most successful floats of the DotCom era. In 2001, he was appointed chairman of TechnologyOne.

Di Marco was member of the Australian Institute of Company Directors and was Deputy Chair of the Australian Information Industry Association from 2002 to 2004. He was the Director of the Royal Children's Hospital Foundation Board from 2004 to 2012.

In 2004 Di Marco won the Pearcey Award for innovative and pioneering achievement and contribution to research and development in IT. He was awarded Fellow of the Australian Computer Society in 2010. When he stepped down as CEO in May 2017, Di Marco was one of the longest-serving chief executives of an ASX-listed company.

As CEO, Di Marco established the philanthropic TechnologyOne Foundation, which has made donations to Opportunity International Australia, the School of St Jude in Tanzania, The Fred Hollows Foundation, and others. He also advocated against a business model run by professional managers, which caused the company difficulties in the early 2000s. He has argued that a focus on corporate governance weakens companies and that subject matter experts are more important to have on a board than independent directors.

== Post-CEO ==
In May 2017, Di Marco stepped down as CEO from the company but remained its Executive Chairman and Chief Innovation Officer. As of 2019, Di Marco's 8.6 per cent stake in the company was worth more than $240m, and with his other investments in property, his net worth is reportedly more than $300m.

In 2017, Di Marco invested in accounting software start-up Practice Ignition. In 2018, Di Marco made a $3.2 million investment in sports tech firm Fusion Sport. In 2019, Di Marco made a $500,000 investment with Snackwise.

Di Marco is a founding member of Software Queensland, a group promoting the Queensland software industry. In February 2022, he announced he would be stepping down as TechnologyOne's executive chairman after 35 years with the company, with his resignation effective on 30 June.

Di Marco was awarded the Medal of the Order of Australia in the 2025 Australia Day Honours for "service to information technology, and to the community".
