= Philip James Ayres =

Australian biographer and literary historian (1944–2021)

Philip James Ayres OAM (28 July 1944 – 15 August 2021) was an Australian biographer and literary historian, described by High Court Justice Dyson Heydon as "one of the best biographers this country has ever produced".

== Education ==
Ayres was born in Lobethal, South Australia. He was of German and Anglo-Scottish cultural heritage. He attended Adelaide Boys High School and the University of Adelaide (PhD 1971). He taught at the University of Adelaide, Monash University (1972 to 2006), Vassar College and Boston University.

== Academic work ==
Ayres' biography subjects included Malcolm Fraser, Douglas Mawson, former Australian Chief Justice Sir Owen Dixon, Sydney's late-19th-century, early-20th-century Catholic Archbishop Patrick Francis Moran and Sir Ninian Stephen (who had been Australia's Governor-General for most of the 1980s). His last book, a collection of biographical vignettes built around personal one-on-one encounters with numerous internationally significant people quite aside from the subjects of his biographies, was Private Encounters in the Public World.

His literary-historical books include Classical Culture and the Idea of Rome in Eighteenth-Century England. According to WorldCat, the book is held in 398 libraries. He was the editor of the two-volume Clarendon Press edition of Shaftesbury's Characteristicks.

The British Law Quarterly Review described his Owen Dixon as a "conspicuous success" in marrying "distinguished scholarship and narrative skills", while the Australian Law Journal devoted a 14-page section to complimentary analyses of the same book. Fortunate Voyager, the account of Sir Ninian Stephen's life, displays similar research and narrative methodologies. The other biographies have also received generally excellent reviews in the relevant professional journals, although the author has been chastised by one (clerical) critic for declining to moralise his avowedly non-moral and objectivist presentation of character.

He also wrote first-hand accounts of several conflict zones, having travelled with Malcolm Fraser in South Africa (1986) and Somalia (1992), and with the Hezb-i-Islami jihadists in Afghanistan in 1987.

The lists below of learned articles and book reviews are representative of published works too extensive to be noticed here.

== Honours and recognition ==
Ayres was a Fellow of the Royal Historical Society (London), a Fellow of the Australian Academy of the Humanities, and a recipient of the Centenary Medal in 2001 for contributions to literature.

He was awarded the Medal of the Order of Australia in the 2025 Australia Day Honours.

== Bibliography ==
=== Books ===
- Ayres, Philip J. (1977). Tourneur : The Revenger's Tragedy. London: Edward Arnold.
- Munday, Anthony (1980). Philip J. Ayres (ed.). The English Roman life. Oxford: Clarendon Press.
- Ayres, Philip J. (ed.) (1987) Ben Jonson: Sejanus His Fall. Manchester: Manchester University Press.
- — (1987). Malcolm Fraser: A Biography . Richmond, Vic.: William Heinemann Australia. Foreword by Valéry Giscard d'Estaing.
- — (1997). Classical Culture and the Idea of Rome in Eighteenth-Century England. Cambridge: Cambridge University Press.
- — (ed.) (1999) Anthony Ashley Cooper, 3rd Earl of Shaftesbury: Characteristics of Men, Manners, Opinions, Times. 2 vols. Oxford: Clarendon Press.
- — (1999). Mawson: A Life. Carlton, Vic.: Miegunyah Press.
- — (2003). Owen Dixon. Carlton, Vic.: Miegunyah Press.
- — (2007). Owen Dixon (revised edition). Carlton, Vic.: Miegunyah Press.
- — (2007). Prince of the Church : Patrick Francis Moran, 1830-1911. Carlton, Vic.: Miegunyah Press.
- — (2013) Fortunate Voyager: The Worlds of Ninian Stephen. Carlton, Vic.: Miegunyah Press.
- — (2019). Private Encounters in the Public World. Brisbane, Qld.: Connor Court.
- _ (ed.) (2021). The Washington Diaries of Owen Dixon 1942-1944. Sydney, NSW: The Federation Press.
