= Bronwyn Fox =

Australian professor of materials science

Bronwyn Fox AO FRACI FTSE
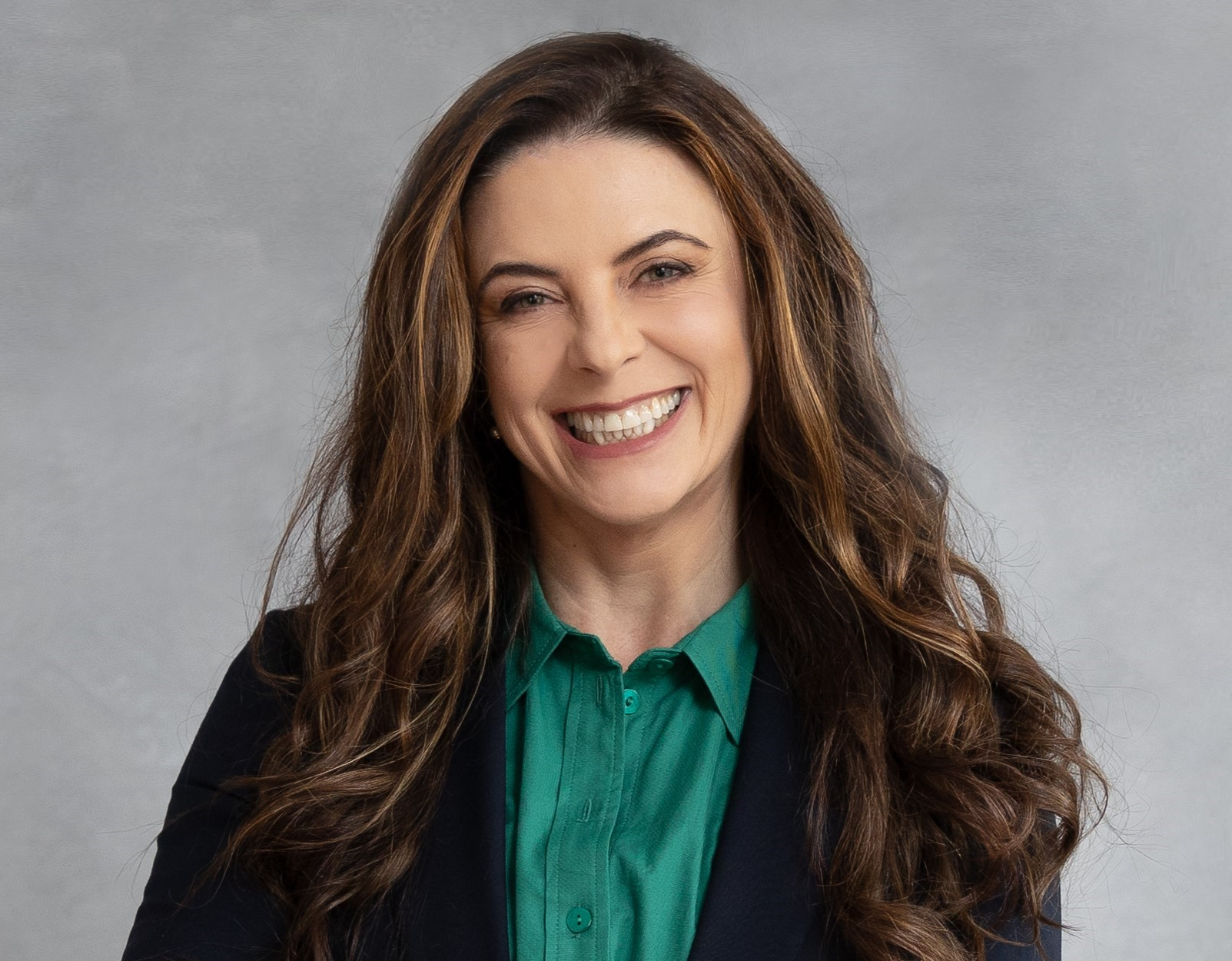
- Fox in 2024
- Education: University of Melbourne; Australian National University
- Scientific career
- Workplaces: University of New South Wales; CSIRO; Deakin University; Swinburne University of Technology
- Thesis: The manufacture, characterization and aging of novel high temperature carbon fibre composites (2001)

Bronwyn Fox is an Australian scientist who is professor of materials science and the deputy vice chancellor research and enterprise at the University of New South Wales. She formerly served as the chief scientist at CSIRO. Her research considers carbon fibre and composite materials. She was awarded the 2020 Royal Society of Victoria Medal for Excellence in Scientific Research.

== Early life and education ==
Fox is the daughter of two scientists. She completed her undergraduate studies at the University of Melbourne and her doctoral research at the Australian National University. Her thesis explored the manufacture and characterisation of high temperature carbon fibre composites.

== Research and career ==
In the early 2000s, Fox joined Deakin University, where she founded the Carbon Nexus facility. This drove research in carbon fibre and composites, and increased industry collaborations. She worked at Swinburne University of Technology as Deputy Vice Chancellor of Research and Enterprise. In 2016 she was made founding Director of the Swinburne's Manufacturing Futures Research Institute, the "Factory of the Future,". She was made Chair of the Victorian Division of the Australian Academy of Technology and Engineering from 2019 to 2022.

Fox worked as chief scientist at CSIRO. She was the fourth woman to hold the position, and it was the first time women held three of Australia's top government jobs. In 2022 she was made President of the German – Australia Chamber of Industry and Commerce. The focus of the Chamber was to drive bilateral agreements to accelerate progress toward net zero. In 2023 she was appointed the Expert Adviser on the International Scientific Report on Advanced AI Safety for Australia.

In 2024 she joined the University of New South Wales as Deputy Vice-Chancellor for Research and Enterprise.

== Awards and honours ==
- 2017 Fellow of the Australian Academy of Technological Sciences and Engineering (FTSE)
- Fellow of Engineers Australia
- Fellow of the Royal Australian Chemical Institute (FRACI)
- Appointed to the National Quantum Advisory Committee
- 2020 Royal Society of Victoria Medal for Excellence in Scientific Research
- 2022 Victorian Finalist for Australian of the Year
- Chair of the National Robotics Strategy Advisory Committee
- Officer of the Order of Australia (AO) in the 2025 Australia Day Honours

== Selected publications ==
- Firas Awaja; Michael Gilbert; Georgina Kelly; Bronwyn Fox; Paul J. Pigram (September 2009). "Adhesion of polymers". Progress in Polymer Science. 34 (9): 948–968. doi:10.1016/j.progpolymsci.2009.04.007. ISSN 0079-6700. Wikidata Q57528232.
- Minoo Naebe; Jing Wang; Abbas Amini; Hamid Khayyam; Nishar Hameed; Lu Hua Li; Ying Chen; Bronwyn Fox (14 March 2014). "Mechanical property and structure of covalent functionalised graphene/epoxy nanocomposites". Scientific Reports. 4: 4375. Bibcode:2014NatSR...4E4375N. doi:10.1038/srep04375. ISSN 2045-2322. PMC 3953726. PMID 24625497. Wikidata Q38270643.
- Mickey G. Huson; Jeffrey S. Church; Abdullah A. Kafi; Andrea L. Woodhead; Jiyi Khoo; M.S.R.N. Kiran; Jodie E. Bradby; Bronwyn L. Fox (March 2014). "Heterogeneity of carbon fibre". Carbon. 68: 240–249. doi:10.1016/j.carbon.2013.10.084. ISSN 0008-6223. Wikidata Q56489585.
