= TechnologyOne =

Australian software development company

Technology One Ltd
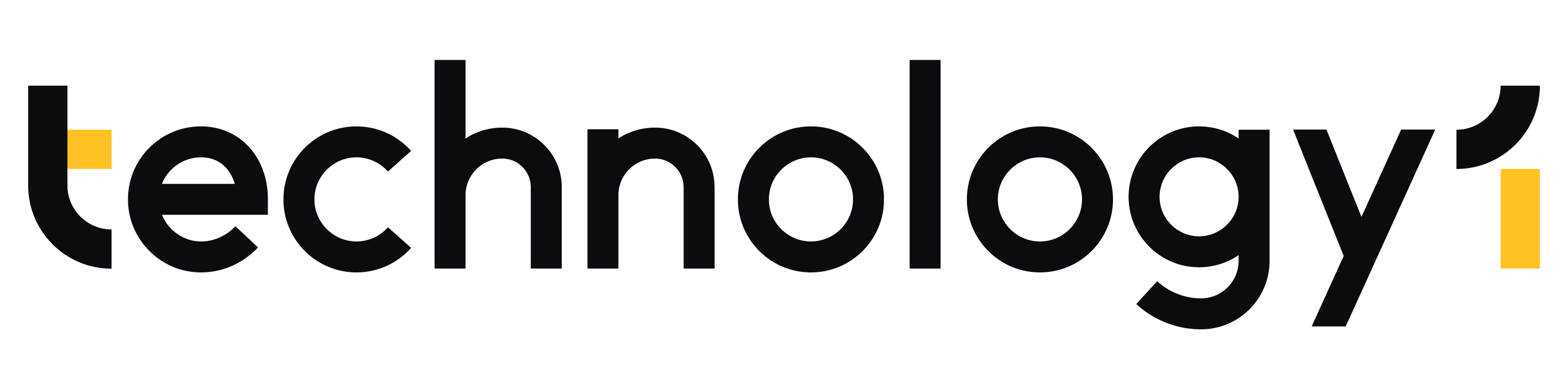
- Type: Public
- Traded as: ASX: TNE
- Industry: Software development
- Founded: 1987; 39 years ago
- Founder: Adrian Di Marco
- Headquarters: Brisbane, Australia
- Area served: Australia, Malaysia, New Zealand, United Kingdom, South Pacific
- Key people: Edward Chung (CEO and Managing Director); Stuart MacDonald (COO); Cale Bennett (CFO); Chandan Potukuchi (CTO)
- Products: Commercial support software
- Services: Business support Project management Consulting
- Revenue: A$515.4 million (2024)
- Net income: A$118 million (2024)
- Number of employees: 1,500 (2025)
- Website: technology1.com

TechnologyOne Limited is an Australian enterprise software ERP company founded in 1987. The company is headquartered in Fortitude Valley in Brisbane, Australia, with other offices in United Kingdom, New Zealand, South Pacific and Asia. It has been a listed company on the Australian Securities Exchange since 1999.

== History ==
TechnologyOne was founded by Adrian Di Marco in 1987, when he saw an opportunity to build a new generation of accounting software for businesses and government departments, using relational database technology. DiMarco approached investors John and Dugald Mactaggart of J.L. Mactaggart Industries, a former customer, for financial backing.

TechnologyOne set up its first research & development centre in a demountable office in the car park at Mactaggart's hide processing plant in Hemmant, Brisbane, in 1987. In the early 1990s, TechnologyOne built the Automated Titling System (ATS) for the Queensland Department of Natural Resource & Mines.

In 1992, TechnologyOne developed a student administration system called College Administration System (CAP) for TAFE Queensland, which led to the development of StudentOne (now TechnologyOne Student Management), used by Australian universities. The company also expanded in New Zealand.

TechnologyOne was listed on the Australian Securities Exchange in 1999. In October 2000, the company raised $18 million from investors including Hyperion Asset Management, Selector Funds Management, Pendal Group, Spheria Asset Management, Colonial First State, River Capital and Pengana.

In 2005, TechnologyOne shifted focus from functionality-centric software to people-centric software. In 2006, it expanded in UK with its first office in Maidenhead.

In November 2010, TechnologyOne announced it would make its software available on the cloud. The company invested heavily in research and development to transition its software functionalities into the cloud, spending $150 million to develop its software-as-a-service cloud products. It also released Ci Anywhere, a version of its Connected Intelligence product hosted in the cloud and available from any desktop or mobile device.

In 2014, TechnologyOne entered the S&P/ASX 200 Index and recorded $1 billion market capitalization.

In May 2017 Di Marco stepped down as CEO and COO, Edward Chung, took over as CEO. At the company's full year results on 21 November 2017, the company's cloud business turned a profit for the first time, posting a $2.5 million profit for the year to September, and signing 112 new cloud customers.

In 2019, the company announced that it had reached $300 million of annual revenues. It also added Cliff Rosenberg, formerly managing director of LinkedIn, to its board of directors. By December 2019, half of TechnologyOne's business was in the cloud; From 1999 to 2019, TechnologyOne doubled in size every five years.

In 2020, the company announced that half of its customers had transitioned from on-premise to SaaS and that 86% of its revenue is now subscription revenue. As of May 2020, the company had posted 11 years of record annual profit.

In September 2021, the company made their first international acquisition by acquiring UK-based higher education software company Scientia for £12 million.

As of October 2024, the company had posted 15 consecutive years of record annual profit. To further focus their efforts and an aim to deepen partnerships within the local government and higher education industries, TechnologyOne changed their internal structure in October 2024.

As of November 2024, TechnologyOne acquired curriculum management solution, CourseLoop. TechnologyOne’s OneEducation is a SaaS platform that covers the student lifecycle from course design to graduation.

In September 2025, TechnologyOne became an ASX 50 company for the first time.

== Software as a service ==
Since 2012, the company has transitioned the business from being an on-premises software provider to a software as a service business. This has enabled clients to integrate with third party providers such as MuleSoft and Salesforce.

The first iteration of TechnologyOne's cloud software was launched in 2014, which enabled users to access the platform via the cloud. This allows the company to offer a fully configurable service from its own servers.

TechnologyOne products are used by more than 1,200 organisations in Australia and New Zealand. The company also has customers in the United Kingdom. By 2018, more than 30 per cent of TechnologyOne customers had transitioned to the company's SaaS platform.

== Research and development ==
In 2010, TechnologyOne moved into its new $12 million headquarters in Brisbane, which included what was at the time the largest Australian-owned research and development facility. The company has additional international R&D facilities.

As of June 2019, the company had invested more than $500 million into research and development since its inception. As of 2021, research largely focuses on developing additional functionalities for TechnologyOne's software-as-a-service enterprise resource planning software. It is also creating applications for artificial intelligence and developing a digital experience platform, intended to integrate front and back office applications.

== List of mergers and acquisitions ==
Company	Acquisition date	Business	Country	Price	Ref.
Tablelands Computer Systems	January 2000		Australia	—	
ProClaim Software Pty Ltd	December 6, 2001	Claims Management	Australia	A$10.6 million	
Infoplan	March 2002		Australia	—	
Avand Pty Ltd	October 1, 2007	Enterprise Content Management (ECM)	Australia	A$10 million	
Outcome Manager	August 1, 2008	Business Performance Management (CPM)	Australia	A$1 million	
ICON Software	January 30, 2015	Enterprise Resource Planning (ERP)	Australia	A$10 million	
Digital Mapping Solutions	May 8, 2015	Geographic Information System	Australia	A$12 million	
Jeff Roorda & Associates	September 3, 2015	Asset Management	Australia	A$10 million	
Scientia	October 2, 2021	Education	United Kingdom	£12 million	
CourseLoop	November 1, 2024	Education	Australia	—	
