= St James College, Brisbane =

St James College

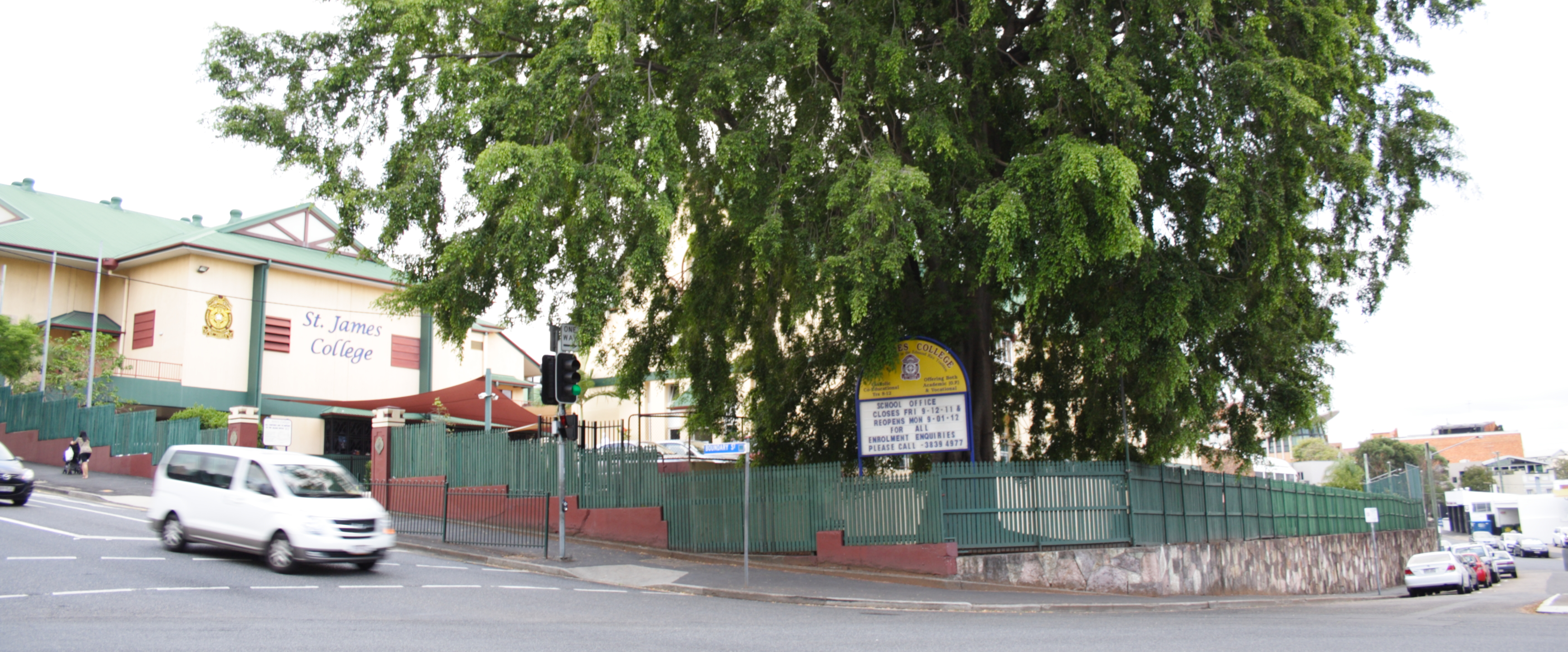
- Main entrance to St James College, Brisbane

Location
- 201 Boundary Street; Spring Hill, Queensland, 4000; Australia
- 27°27′40″S 153°01′48″E

Information
- Type: Independent secondary day school
- Motto: Faithful Forever
- Religious affiliation: Catholicism
- Denomination: Congregation of Christian Brothers
- Established: 1868; 158 years ago
- Trust: Edmund Rice Education Australia
- Principal: Andrée Rice
- Years offered: 5–12
- Gender: Co-educational
- Enrolment: 1033 (2026)
- Campus type: Urban
- Houses: Carey, Hogan, Long, Mary Rice
- Colours: Gold and maroon
- Nickname: Jimmies
- Website: stjamescollege.qld.edu.au

St James College is an independent Catholic secondary day school for boys and girls, located in Spring Hill, Brisbane, Queensland, Australia. St James College, informally known as Jimmies, was established in 1868 with only 12 students and is the oldest Catholic boys' school in Queensland. In 1893, the Congregation of Christian Brothers agreed to take over the school following major economic depression, the government's refusal to pay staff wages and inconsistent student enrolment. As of 2021, the co-educational school had an enrolment of approximately 520 students from Year 7 to Year 12. The school's current principal is Anne Rebgetz.

== History ==
Jerome William Long (1834–1891) was the first lay Principal to lead St James between 1871 and 1877, and again in 1880–90, he is accredited with being the first teacher to hold a Class 2, Division 1 certificate in Queensland. Long was honoured by the college, which named Long House after him.

In 1994, the college began to accept enrolment from girls in years 8 and 11, making it a co-educational institution. In 1994, its name was changed to St. James Prac.; it was then reverted to St. James College in 2001. In 2002, its first female principal was appointed. The college has also been known as Edmund Rice College, St James's, and St James Practical College. The college constructed a new library and science complex named the Joseph Canali Centre, completed in 2015 when the college began accepting enrolments for grade 7. In 2013 enrolment stood at approximately 480 students. The college has grown significantly in recent years, with enrolment reaching 1,033 students in 2026. Recent developments include the opening of the Santiago Building in 2023 and the purchase of the Warren Street building in late 2024, which is scheduled to open in 2027.

== Principals ==
The following individuals have served as principals or headmasters of St James' College:

Ordinal	Officeholder	Term start	Term end	Time in office
1	Mr Long	1868	1869	0–1 years
2	J. Horan	1870	1870	0 years
3	J. W. Long	1871	1881	9–10 years
4	J. J. Dempsey	1882	1882	0 years
5	F. Carton	1883	1884	0–1 years
6	T. O'Leary	1885	1892	6–7 years
7	W. J. Hogan	1893	1898	4–5 years
8	J. C. Ryan	1899	1902	2–3 years
9	W. M. Reidy	1903	1903	0 years
10	J. C. Fenwick	1904	1909	4–5 years
11	M. W. Grace	1910	1911	0–1 years
12	F. P. Bowler	1912	1913	0–1 years
13	T. F. Hogan	1914	1918	3–4 years
14	M. I. Hickey	1919	1922	2–3 years
15	J. F. Murphy	1923	1923	0 years
16	W. B. Redmond	1924	1924	0 years
(13)	T. F. Hogan	1925	1925	0 years
17	J. H. Crowley	1926	1926	0 years
18	C. L. Maloney	1927	1927	0 years
19	J. F. Redmond	1928	1928	0 years
20	P. W. Nolan	1929	1929	0 years
21	A. B. Awylward	1930	1930	0 years
22	T. I. Dowd	1931	1931	0 years
23	F. P. Doonan	1932	1933	0–1 years
24	P. D. Grealy	1934	1937	2–3 years
25	H. I. Jackson	1938	1940	1–2 years
26	B. A. Duffy	1941	1941	0 years
27	P. D. Grealy	1942	1944	1–2 years
28	W. E. O'Donnell	1945	1946	0–1 years
29	O. V. Wynne	1947	1949	1–2 years
30	T. I. Hennessy	1950	1953	2–3 years
31	H. W. Dowd	1954	1955	0–1 years
32	L. L. Bailee	1956	1961	4–5 years
33	F. M. Harding	1962	1967	4–5 years
34	N. C. Langan	1968	1973	4–5 years
35	B. W. Steele	1974	1979	4–5 years
36	W. F. Tynan	1980	1986	5–6 years
37	B. J. Sullivan	1987	1991	3–4 years
38	L. V. Larkin	1992	1993	0–1 years
39	L. W. Quinn	1994	1995	0–1 years
40	P. R. Conn	1996	1997	0–1 years
41	M. J. Sanderson	1998	2001	2–3 years
42	K. P. Tuite	2002	2008	5–6 years
43	G. Crooks	2009	2018	8–9 years
44	A. Rebgetz	2019	2024	6–7 years
45	A. Rice	2025	Current	

== House system ==
There are four houses at St James College, Carey, Hogan, Long and Mary Rice. With the exception of Mary Rice, all were the original houses of St James; Mary Rice was added in recent years.

=== Current houses ===
- Carey House is named after Tom Carey, an old boy of the college. (House colour: blue)
- Hogan House is named after Br Hogan, the first Christian Brother principal of the college. (House colour: gold)
- Long House is named after Jerome William Long, the first lay principal. (House colour: white)
- Mary Rice House is named after Mary Rice, the daughter of Edmund Rice, the founder of the Christian Brothers. (House colour: maroon)

== Sports ==
St James College offers a basketball program that is fully inclusive to all levels of ability for both boys and girls. The Jimmies Basketball Program is accessible to all students regardless of their financial circumstances and focuses on development of the individual. In October 2013, St James College won the 2013 Queensland State Basketball Championship and was crowned the "Best Basketball School in Queensland". The team will now travel to Melbourne in December to represent Queensland in the Australian Schools Basketball Championship.

== Notable alumni ==
- Rodney Eyles – former World No 1 in squash
- Graham Quirk – politician, offices include former Lord Mayor of Brisbane
- John Mickel – politician. He was the Speaker of the Legislative Assembly of Queensland and the Labor member for Logan. He completed his education at St Laurence's College, Brisbane.
- Robert Anderson – Australian Aboriginal elder and former union official. Anderson, often referred to as Uncle Bob, is known for his long association with the Building Workers' Industrial Union of Australia where he was state organiser from 1951 to 1978. He is also an honorary member of the Construction, Forestry, Mining and Energy Union. As a Ngugi elder from Mulgumpin in Quandamooka, Anderson has also served in various roles with an array of indigenous organisations, working in the fields of reconciliation, native title, social justice, youth welfare and cultural identity. In the 1960s, Anderson was a member of the Queensland Council for Advancement for Aborigines and Torres Strait Islanders. In 1999, he was appointed chair of the Aboriginal and Torres Strait Islander Advisory Board, a role he retired from in 2003
- Ross Henrick – Australia Rugby League footballer. He completed his education at Northgate SHS and Banyo SHS.
- Ciaron O'Reilly – Australian anti-war campaigner, peace protester, social justice campaigner and Catholic Worker
- Bishop Ken Howell – Catholic priest, Bishop and Vicar General of the Archdiocese of Brisbane.
- Adrian Di Marco – Australian entrepreneur and businessman.
- Denis Daluri – professional footballer and plays for the South Sudan national team.

== See also ==
- Catholic education in Australia
- List of schools in Queensland
- List of Christian Brothers schools
