= William John Tulloch =

Scottish bacteriologist and medical author

Prof William John Tulloch MD FRSE (1887–1966) was a 20th-century Scottish bacteriologist and medical author. He was an expert on tetanus.

== Life ==
He was born in Dundee on 12 November 1887 the youngest of five children of Henry Tulloch. His father and uncle were hatters, with two shops, H & W Tulloch in Dundee. They lived at 14 Albany Terrace in Dundee. His mother, Coralie von Wassenhove, was from Waerschoot in Belgium.

He studied medicine at St Andrews University and graduated MB ChB in 1909. In 1914 he became the first lecturer in Bacteriology at University College, Dundee.

In the First World War he served as a lecturer at the Royal Army Medical College and on the War Office Committee on Tetanus.

He rose to be Dean of Medicine.

He was elected a Fellow of the Royal Society of Edinburgh in 1960. His proposers were George Bell, Norman Davidson, Ian George Wilson Hill and Ernest Geoffrey Cullwick.

He retired in 1962 and died in Cosham on the south coast of Hampshire on 26 August 1966.

== Family ==
He was married to "Miss Sheridan". His brother Alphonse Martin Tulloch was a noted mariner who served as Fifth Officer of the RMS Olympic (sister ship to the ill-fated RMS Titanic) at the time of its 1911 maiden voyage.

== Artistic recognition ==
His portrait by A. G. C. Ross is held by Dundee University.

== Publications ==
- Diagnostic Value of the Vaccinia Variola Fluctuation Test (1929)
