= Lauren Ayton =

Australian ophthalmologist

Lauren N. Ayton
- Occupation: Optometry/Ophthalmology Researcher
- Employer(s): Centre for Eye Research Australia, University of Melbourne
- Known for: Optometry
- Title: Professor

Lauren N. Ayton is an Australian Professor in the fields of Optometry and Ophthalmology, who received an Order of Australia for “significant service to ophthalmology, to optometry, as well as service to public health as both a clinician and researcher.” She works at the University of Melbourne, and the Centre for Eye Research Australia, in diagnosis and treatment for people with vision-loss.

== Early life and education ==
Ayton had a brother who was born with blindness as a result of a brain injury, which gave her a personal interest, and deep passion for research around restoring vision.

Ayton received her PhD at the University of Melbourne, in paediatric optometry. She then completed a postdoctoral fellowship in ocular motor function and traumatic brain injury. She worked at the Centre for Eye Research Australia from 2010 to 2017, and worked in patient selection and assessing patients in human trials for bionic eye devices in Australia.

== Career ==
Ayton conducts research on methods of preventing and detecting eye diseases, as well as gene therapy for inherited eye diseases such as retinitis pigmentosa, and the bionic eye. She worked in the USA from 2017 to 2019, at Bionic Eye Technologies, which is affiliated with MIT, Cornell and Harvard Universities. Ayton is on the board of UsherKids Australia, as well as a board member for the Retina Australia scientific and medical advisory committee. She is also a board member on the Australian College of Optometry.

Ayton has contributed to various Australian start-up organisations, mostly in the development of treatments and aids to help people with low vision. She has been an investigator on 12 industry-sponsored clinical trials. Ayton is the Associate Dean of Innovation and Enterprise, at the University of Melbourne, in the faculty of Medicine, Dentistry and Health Sciences. As at 2025 she was a Professorial Fellow at the University of Melbourne, in the Departments of Surgery (Ophthamology) and Optometry and Vision Sciences. She is also a Deputy Director of the Centre for Eye Research Australia.

== Media ==
Ayton is a science communicator, who has been a presenter at the 3RRR radio program Einstein A-Go-Go for almost 20 years.

== Publications ==
Select publications authored by Ayton, including a 2025 Nature Scientific Reports paper, include the following:

- Markakis, D., Britten-Jones, A.C., Guymer, R.H. et al. (2025) Retrospective audit reviewing accuracy of clinical diagnosis of geographic atrophy in a single centre private tertiary retinal practice in Australia. Sci Rep 15, 8528. https://doi.org/10.1038/s41598-025-90516-z
- Britten-Jones, A., O’Hare, F., Edwards, T., & Ayton, L. (2022). Victorian evolution of inherited retinal diseases natural history registry (VENTURE study): Rationale, methodology and initial participant characteristics. Clinical and Experimental Ophthalmology, 50(7). https://doi.org/10.1111/ceo.14110
- Britten-Jones, A., Jin, R., Gocuk, S., Cichello, E., O’Hare, F., Hickey, D., Edwards, T., & Ayton, L. (2022). The safety and efficacy of gene therapy treatment for monogenic retinal and optic nerve diseases: A systematic review. Genetics in Medicine, 24(3). https://doi.org/10.1016/j.gim.2021.10.013
- Markakis, D., Britten-Jones, A., Guymer, R., Edwards, T., Hall, A., Kerr, N., Ng, W., Skalicky, S., Ayton, L., & Mack, H. (2025). Retrospective audit reviewing accuracy of clinical diagnosis of geographic atrophy in a single centre private tertiary retinal practice in Australia. Scientific Reports, 15(1). https://doi.org/10.1038/s41598-025-90516-z {Scholia}

== Awards and honours ==
- 2025 - Member of the Order of Australia.
- 2022 - BioMelbourne Emerging Leadership Award.
- 2019 - Tall Poppy of the Year - Victoria.
- 2015 - Victoria Prize for Science and Innovation - Fellowship.
