= Toews =

Toews (/ˈteɪvz/ TAYVZ) is a surname of Vistula Delta, Prussian origin, and is an abbreviation of Matthäus (Matthews). Notable people with this name include:

- Brian Toews (1941-2019), Canadian curler, 1984 Brier champion
- BT Toews (born 1966), Canadian basketball coach and player
- David Toews (born 1990), Canadian hockey player
- David Waltner-Toews (born 1948), Canadian epidemiologist, writer and veterinarian
- Devon Toews (born 1994), Canadian hockey player
- Georgia Toews (born 1990), Canadian novelist
- Gisela Toews (born 1940), German speed skater
- Jeff Toews (born 1957), American football player
- John E. Toews (born 1944), Canadian historian
- Jonathan Toews (born 1988), Canadian hockey player
- Kai Toews (born 1998), Japanese basketball player
- Loren Toews (born 1951), American football player
- Miriam Toews (born 1964), Canadian writer of Mennonite descent
- Travis Toews (born 1964), Canadian politician
- Vic Toews (born 1952), Canadian politician

== See also ==
- Toews Lake, Manitoba, Canada, named after Jonathan Toews
