= Graeme Hankey =

Australian neurologist

Graeme John Hankey AO FAHMS is an Australian neurologist and academic. He is Chair of Stroke Research at the Centre for Neuromuscular and Neurological Disorders at the University of Western Australia and the Perron Institute for Neurological and Translational Science.

He was elected a Fellow of the Royal College of Physicians of London and the Royal College of Physicians of Edinburgh. In the 2025 King's Birthday Honours, Hankey was appointed an Officer of the Order of Australia (AO).

== Early life and education ==
Hankey was born in Collie, Western Australia. He attended Nedlands Primary School and Christ Church Grammar School in Perth, where he received academic and sporting distinctions. He studied medicine at the University of Western Australia, graduating with a Bachelor of Medicine, Bachelor of Surgery (MBBS) in 1981. He obtained Fellowship of the Royal Australasian College of Physicians (FRACP) in 1988, Membership of the Royal College of Physicians (MRCP) in 1990, and a Doctor of Medicine (MD) from the University of Western Australia in 1993.

== Career ==
In 1988, Hankey was appointed Senior Clinical Fellow in Neurology at the Mayo Clinic in the United States. Between 1989 and 1992, he worked as a research fellow at the University of Edinburgh and Western General Hospital in Scotland.

In 1992, Hankey returned to Australia and was appointed Consultant Neurologist at Royal Perth Hospital. From 2013 to 2023, he served as Professor of Neurology at the University of Western Australia and Consultant Neurologist at Sir Charles Gairdner Hospital. In 2023, he was appointed the inaugural Perron Institute Chair in Stroke Research at the University of Western Australia and the Perron Institute for Neurological and Translational Science.

== Research ==
Hankey's publications include more than 1,000 research articles in peer-reviewed scientific journals and 13 books, including multiple editions of Hankey's Clinical Neurology.

Hankey has contributed to large international studies of stroke risk factors and disease burden, including the INTERSTROKE study and the Global Burden of Disease Study, as well as the Perth Community Stroke Study and the Australian Collaborative Registry of Stroke.

Hankey has studied the organization and treatment of acute stroke, including stroke unit care, thrombolysis and other reperfusion therapies. He served as an investigator or steering committee member in several major clinical trials, including the International Stroke Trial (IST) and IST-3. His work with the Stroke Unit Trialists' Collaboration contributed to evidence supporting organized stroke-unit care for people with acute stroke.

Hankey's research include secondary prevention of stroke, including antiplatelet and anticoagulant therapy, atrial fibrillation, vascular risk factors and other causes of recurrent stroke. He was principal investigator of the VITATOPS trial, which examined folic acid and vitamin B supplementation for the prevention of recurrent stroke and vascular events.

The AXIOMATIC-SSP trial contributed to the selection of a dose of milvexian for the phase 3 LIBREXIA STROKE trial of the oral factor XIa inhibitor milvexian.

Hankey was a member of the Stroke Assessment Committee of the LIPID trial, which examined the effects of pravastatin therapy on cardiovascular outcomes and stroke.

He also co-chaired the Endpoint Adjudication Committee of the LoDoCo2 trial of colchicine in chronic coronary disease.

== Honours and awards ==
- President's Award of the Heart Foundation of Australia (1999)
- Western Australian Premier's Award for Achievement in Science (2006)
- Stroke Society of Australasia Excellence in Stroke Award (2011)
- Jamieson Medal of the Neurosurgical Society of Australasia (2014)
- American Stroke Association David G. Sherman Lecture Award (2015)
- Wesfarmers Harry Perkins Medal (2015)
- Fellow of the American Heart Association (2014)
- Fellow of the Australian Academy of Health and Medical Sciences (2016)
- Fellow of the European Stroke Organisation (2016)
- Fellow of the World Stroke Organization (2019)

== Selected publications ==
- Hankey, G. J.; Warlow, C. P. (1999). "Treatment and secondary prevention of stroke: evidence, costs, and effects on individuals and populations". The Lancet. 354 (9188): 1457–1463.
- Hankey, G. J.; Eikelboom, J. W.; Baker, R. I.; van Bockxmeer, F. M.; et al. (2007). "VITATOPS, the VITAmins TO Prevent Stroke Trial: rationale and design of a randomised trial of B-vitamin therapy in patients with recent transient ischaemic attack or stroke". International Journal of Stroke. 2 (2): 144–150.
- Hankey, G. J.; Eikelboom, J. W.; Yi, Q.; Lees, K. R.; Chen, C. P. L.; Wong, K. S. L.; et al. (2012). "Antiplatelet therapy and the effects of B vitamins in patients with previous stroke or transient ischaemic attack: a post-hoc subanalysis of VITATOPS, a randomised, placebo-controlled trial". The Lancet Neurology. 11 (6): 512–520.
- Hankey, G. J. (2012). "Anticoagulant therapy for patients with ischaemic stroke". Nature Reviews Neurology. 8 (6): 319–328.
- Hankey, G. J. (2013). "The global and regional burden of stroke". The Lancet Global Health. 1 (5): e239–e240.
- Hankey, G. J.; Hackett, M. L.; Almeida, O. P.; Flicker, L.; Mead, G. E.; Dennis, M. S.; et al. Publications from the Assessment oF FluoxetINe In sTroke recoverY (AFFINITY) trial.
- Hankey, G. J. (2021). "Evolution of Evidence-Based Medicine in Stroke". Cerebrovascular Diseases. 50 (6): 644–655.
- Hankey, G. J.; Warlow, C. P. (1994). Transient ischaemic attacks of the brain and eye. London: W. B. Saunders/Ballière Tindall.
