= Stuart White (educator) =

Australian environmentalist and researcher

Stuart White AM is an Australian educator and sustainability advocate. He is a professor and the Director of the Institute for Sustainable Futures at the University of Technology, Sydney. White has researched sustainability for more than twenty years, specialising in least cost planning for utilities and resource use efficiency. In 1998, White was a member of the NSW Task Force on Water Conservation, and in 2001 was a member of the Expert Panel on Environmental Flows for the Hawkesbury Nepean. He has written widely on sustainable futures and is often quoted in the media. White has criticised the building of desalination plants, citing their high operational costs and energy usage.
