= Sylvia Tulloch =

Australian materials scientist

Sylvia Tulloch AM
- Education: University of New South Wales
- Occupation: Materials scientist
- Known for: Renewable energy startups

Sylvia Tulloch AM is an Australian materials scientist, who was awarded an Order of Australia in 2025 for her work in renewable energy, innovation and the technology commercialisation field, specialising in cleantech and decarbonisation. She is one of the Australian solar industry pioneers, and is a female founder and female "Angel Investor".

== Education and career ==
Tulloch has a Bachelor of Science degree, as well as a Master's of Materials Science – Ceramics, both from the University of New South Wales.

Tulloch has been a member of various cleantech industry companies. She was one of the members of the Future Manufacturing Industries Innovation Council. As at 2025, she is also chair of the ACT Renewable Energy Innovation Fund Business Advisory Board.

Tulloch was also the co-founder and director of Halocell, formerly known as Greatcell Energy, the managing director of Dyesol, from 2004 to 2012, and founder of Silicon Technologies Australia, from 1987 to 2000. She was Chief Scientist of Morganiste Australia from 1975 to 1977.

Tulloch has held numerous roles in the field of renewable energy, including Director of Uniflow Power, Director of SunDrive Solar, Chairperson of Lava Blue, and the chairperson on the Business Advisory Board of the Renewable Energies Innovation Fund, from 2016 to 2021. She was Chair of Zeotech Limited, a company which processes industrial kaolin and minerals processing, for manufactured zeolites. At Lava Blue, she was also chair for the company, that developed materials which were high purity, for the production of solar batteries, as well as other energy technologies. Tulloch was also the chair of a company which was involved in developing sensor technology with medical applications, Balance Mat.

Tulloch is the Chair of Griffin Accelerator Holdings, and one of the board members of the Canberra Innovation Network.

Tulloch is an 'Angel Investor', having sold her business in 2012, and then deciding to share her wealth in several other companies in the start up phase. Tulloch is one of very few female founders, or female Angel Investors, and Tulloch also mentors and provides business and tax advice, as well as introductions to relevant business services such as patent lawyers.

Over Tulloch's career, having sold her business in 2012 after seven years of listing on the ASX, she has been the chair or board member for various clean tech startups. She has also mentored various start-ups, including the Canberra-based deep-tech start-up, PPB, as well as other companies through the Griffin Accelerator.

== Awards ==
- 2012 – Lifetime Achievement Award Finalist. 2012 Endeavour Awards from Manufacturing Month.
- 2025 – Member of the Order of Australia.
