= Jeff Tow-Arnett =

American football player (born 1986)

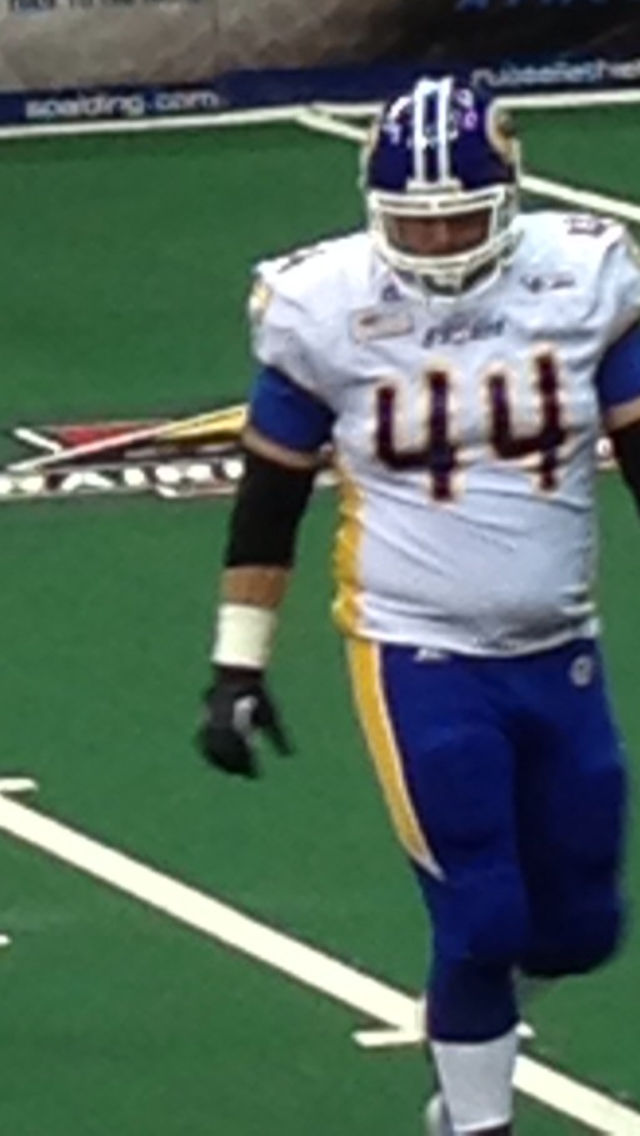
- Tow-Arnett during a 2013 game

Profile
- Position: Center/Fullback

Personal information
- Born: November 19, 1986 (age 39)
- Listed height: 6 ft 2 in (1.88 m)
- Listed weight: 300 lb (136 kg)

Career information
- High school: Redwood Valley (MN)
- College: Minnesota
- NFL draft: 2010: undrafted

Career history
- Tampa Bay Buccaneers (2010)*; Milwaukee Mustangs (2011–2012); Tampa Bay Storm (2013); Los Angeles Kiss (2014)*; Cleveland Gladiators (2014)
- * Offseason or practice squad member only

Career AFL statistics
- Rushing attempts: 25
- Rushing yards: 53
- Rushing touchdowns: 4
- Receiving yards: 79
- Receiving touchdowns: 2
- Stats at ArenaFan.com

Jeffery Tow-Arnett (born November 19, 1986) is an American former football fullback. He played college football at Minnesota where he was a Center. He was signed as an undrafted free agent by the Milwaukee Mustangs in 2011. Jeffery co-owns Golden Gate Equestrian Center in Jordan Minnesota.

== Professional career ==
=== Tampa Bay Buccaneers ===
After going undrafted during the 2010 NFL draft, Tow-Arnett was signed by the Tampa Bay Buccaneers. Tow-Arnett failed to make the Buccaneers final roster.

=== Milwaukee Mustangs ===
In 2011, Tow-Arnett signed with the Milwaukee Mustangs of the Arena Football League. He transitioned into a fullback from his natural center position. Tow-Arnett played with the Mustangs again in 2012.

=== Tampa Bay Storm ===
In 2013, Tow-Arnett played for the Tampa Bay Storm.

=== Los Angeles Kiss ===
On October 24, 2013, Tow-Arnett was assigned to the Los Angeles Kiss.
