= Educational Research and Evaluation =

- Discipline: Education
- Language: English
- Edited by: Donnie Adams, Wei Zhang

Publication details
- History: 1995-present
- Publisher: Routledge
- Frequency: 8/year
- Open access: Hybrid

Standard abbreviations
- ISO 4: Educ. Res. Eval.

Indexing
- ISSN: 1380-3611 (print); 1744-4187 (web)
- LCCN: 2007233471
- OCLC no.: 632572661
- Evaluation & Research in Education
- ISSN: 0950-0790 (print); 1747-7514 (web)
- LCCN: 2008252968
- OCLC no.: 609522121

Links
- Journal homepage; Online access; Online archive; Online archive Evaluation & Research in Education (1987-2011)

Educational Research and Evaluation is a peer-reviewed academic journal covering research on all aspects of education and its evaluation. It is published by Routledge and the editors-in-chief are Donnie Adams (The University of Melbourne) and Wei Zhang (University of Leicester) . The journal was established in 1995 and in 2012 absorbed Evaluation & Research in Education (1987-2011).

== Abstracting and indexing ==
The journal is abstracted and indexed in:

- Emerging Sources Citation Index
- EBSCO databases
- ProQuest databases
- PsycINFO
- Scopus
