= Public housing estates in Tuen Mun =

Public housing in Tuen Mun, Hong Kong

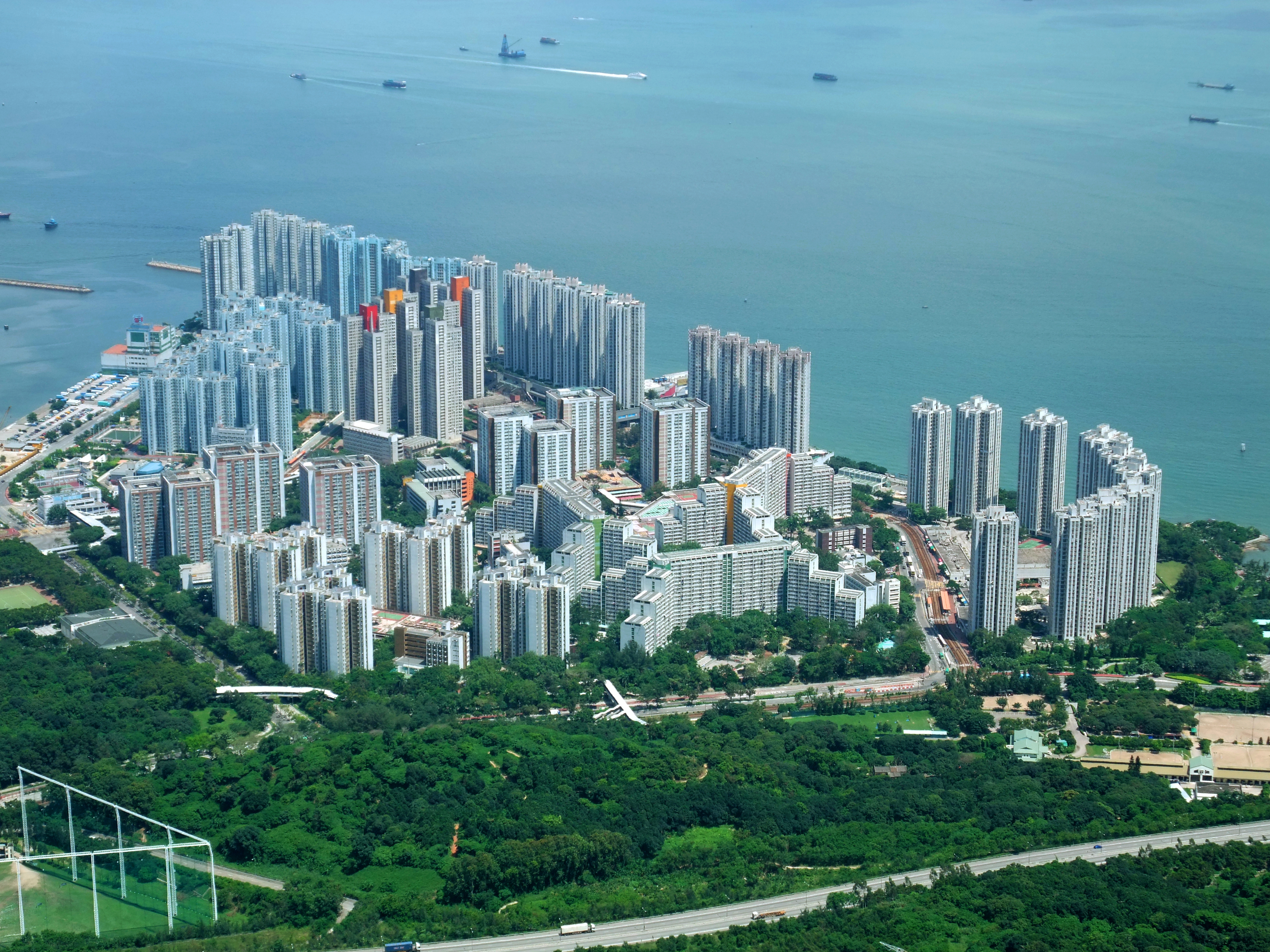
The southern part of Tuen Mun, showing Butterfly Estate, Melody Garden, Yuet Wu Villa, Siu Hei Court, Siu Shan Court, and Wu King Estate

The following is an overview of public housing estates in Tuen Mun, Hong Kong, including Home Ownership Scheme (HOS), Private Sector Participation Scheme (PSPS), Sandwich Class Housing Scheme (SCHS), Flat-for-Sale Scheme (FFSS), Subsidised Sale Flats Project (SSFP), and Tenants Purchase Scheme (TPS) estates.

== History ==
Tuen Mun used to be a rural area. At a time when the population had swelled dramatically with refugees from China, many of them living in substandard housing, the government launched a plan to provide modern housing to the masses. As part of this policy, Tuen Mun was developed as a new town from the early 1970s. Land was reclaimed from the sea in order to provide space suitable for development. Much of Castle Peak Bay was filled in. The first public housing estate in Tuen Mun was Castle Peak Estate, completed in 1971, which has since been demolished.

Construction of the Tuen Mun New Town has been basically complete since the turn of the millennium, with most of the public housing estates built before then. Two newer estates are Lung Yat Estate, completed in 2013, and the Yan Tin Estate, completed in 2018 at the rural fringe of the new town.

== Overview ==
Name		Type	Inaug.	No Blocks	No Units	Notes
Affluence Garden	澤豐花園	PSPS	1989	5	2,208	
Butterfly Estate	蝴蝶邨	Public	1983	6	5,405	
Chi Lok Fa Yuen	置樂花園	PSPS	1982	8	1,000	
Ching Tin Estate	菁田邨	Public	2022	5	4,000	
Fu Tai Estate	富泰邨	Public	2000	11	5,066	
Glorious Garden	富健花園	PSPS	1999	12	3,026	
Hin Fat Estate	顯發邨	Public	2024	1	872	
Kin Sang Estate	建生邨	TPS	1989	4	685	
Kingston Terrace	景新臺	Flat-For-Sale	2002	4	1,152	HK Housing Society
Leung King Estate	良景邨	TPS	1988	8	3,479	
Lung Mun Oasis	龍門居	PSPS	1998	16	3,800	
Lung Yat Estate	龍逸邨	Public	2013	2	990	
Melody Garden	美樂花園	Middle Income	1984	10	2,240	
On Ting Estate	安定邨	Public	1980	6	5,049	
Po Tin Estate	寶田邨	Public	2000	9	8,736	also Interim Housing
Prime View Garden	景峰花園	PSPS	1985	5	1,520	
Sam Shing Estate	三聖邨	Public	1980	3	1,834	
San Wai Court	新圍苑	HOS	1989	6	2,100	
Shan King Estate	山景邨	TPS	1983	9	8,644	
Siu Shan Court	兆山苑	HOS	1983	12	1,872	
Siu Lun Court	兆麟苑	HOS	1993	12	4,200	
Siu Lung Court	兆隆苑	HOS	1991	1	612	
Siu Hei Court	兆禧苑	HOS	1985	5	2,800	
Siu Hin Court	兆軒苑	HOS	1991	2	1,224	
Siu Hong Court	兆康苑	HOS	1982	20	4,676	
Siu Kwai Court	兆畦苑	HOS	1990	2	1,425	
Siu On Court	兆安苑	HOS	1982	10	1,311	
Siu Pong Court	兆邦苑	HOS	1991	1	612	
Tai Hing Estate	大興邨	Public	1977	7	8,602	
Tin King Estate	田景邨	TPS	1989	4	1,280	
Terrace Concerto	翠鳴臺	SSFP	2021	1	290	HK Housing Society
Tsui Ning Garden	翠寧花園	PSPS	1991	6	2,100	
Wo Tin Estate	和田邨	Public	2022	4	4,232	
Wu King Estate	湖景邨	Public	1982	6	4,386	
Yan Tin Estate	欣田邨	Public	2018	5	4,688	
Yau Oi Estate	友愛邨	Public	1980	11	9,153	
Yip Wong Estate	業旺邨	Public	2024	1		
Yuet Wu Villa	悅湖山莊	PSPS	1994	15	3,890	

== Estates ==
=== Affluence Garden ===
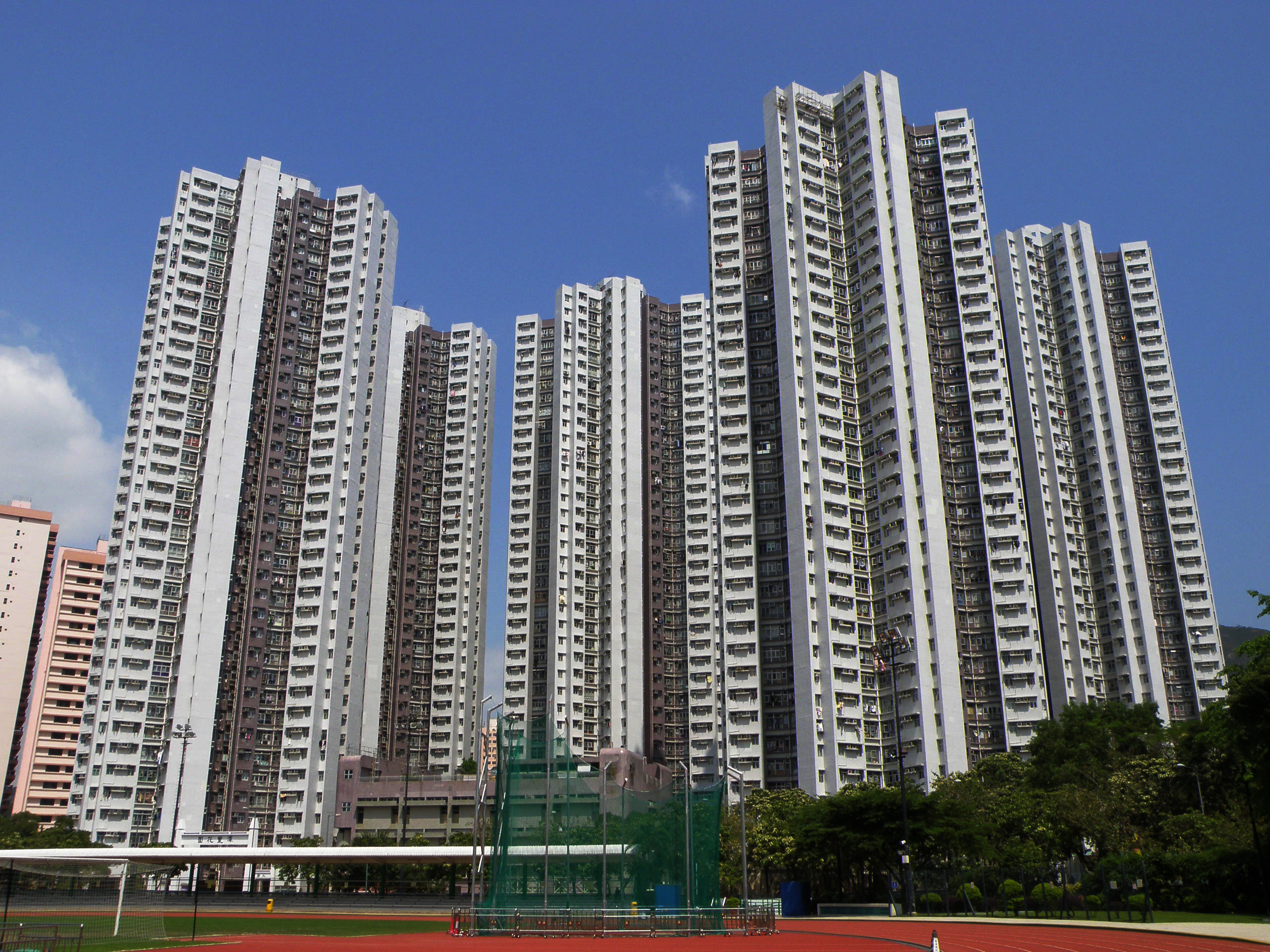
Affluence Garden

Affluence Garden (Chinese: 澤豐花園) is a Home Ownership Scheme and Private Sector Participation Scheme court in Tuen Mun, beside Tuen Mun River. It consists of 5 residential blocks built in 1989.

Name	Type	Completion
Block 1 (Prosperland House)	Private Sector Participation Scheme	1989
Block 2 (Felicitous House)	Private Sector Participation Scheme	1989
Block 3 (Civic House)	Private Sector Participation Scheme	1989
Block 4 (Pacific House)	Private Sector Participation Scheme	1989
Block 5 (Opulent House)	Private Sector Participation Scheme	1989

=== Butterfly Estate ===
Butterfly Estate (Chinese: 蝴蝶邨) is the seventh public housing estate in Tuen Mun, completed in 1983. Built in the reclaimed land of Castle Peak Bay, the estate consists of 6 residential blocks.

Butterfly Estate Public Library of Hong Kong Public Libraries was reprovisioned and expanded in 2010.

Butterfly Estate is in Primary One Admission (POA) School Net 70. Within the school net are multiple aided schools (operated independently but funded with government money) and the following government schools: Tuen Mun Government Primary School (屯門官立小學).

English Name	Chinese Name	Type	Completion
Tip Chui House	蝶聚樓	Ziggurat	1983
Tip Ling House	蝶翎樓	Ziggurat	1983
Tip Mo House	蝶舞樓	Ziggurat	1983
Tip Sum House	蝶心樓	Ziggurat	1983
Tip Yee House	蝶意樓	Ziggurat	1983
Tip Ying House	蝶影樓	Ziggurat	1983

=== Chi Lok Fa Yuen ===
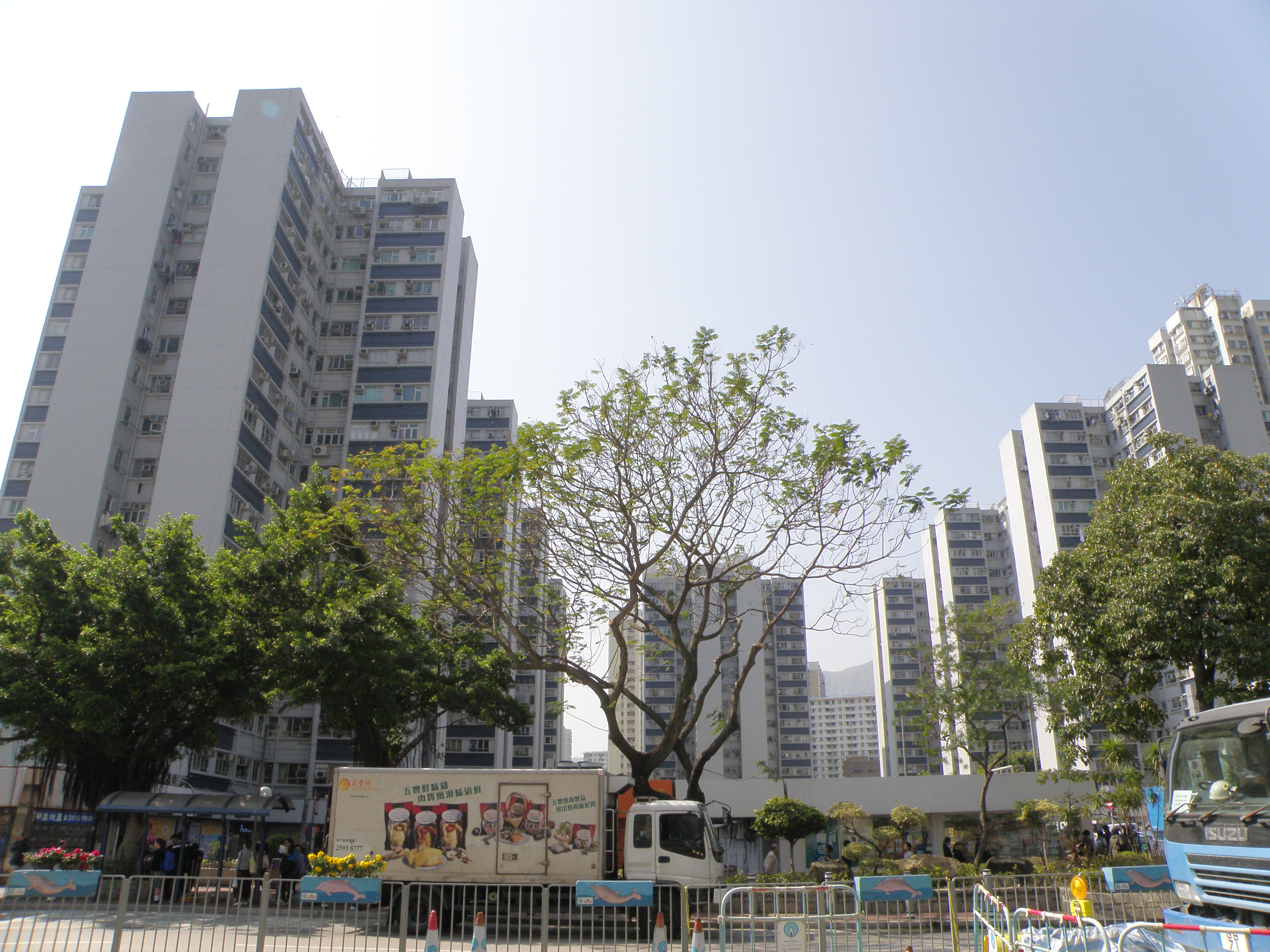
Chi Lok Fa Yuen

Chi Lok Fa Yuen (Chinese: 置樂花園) is a Home Ownership Scheme and Private Sector Participation Scheme estate in Tsing Hoi Circuit, Tuen Mun, New Territories, Hong Kong. Built on the reclaimed land of Castle Peak Bay, It comprises eight residential blocks and a shopping centre completed in 1982. It was jointly developed by Hong Kong Housing Authority and Sun Hung Kai Properties.

Block No.	Name	Type	Completion
Block 1	Lok Man Yuen	Private Sector Participation Scheme	1982
Block 2	Lok Lai Yuen	Private Sector Participation Scheme	1982
Block 3	Lok Yee Yuen	Private Sector Participation Scheme	1982
Block 4	Lok Hang Yuen	Private Sector Participation Scheme	1982
Block 5	Lok Chun Yuen	Private Sector Participation Scheme	1982
Block 6	Lok Cheong Yuen	Private Sector Participation Scheme	1982
Block 7	Lok Wing Yuen	Private Sector Participation Scheme	1982
Block 8	Lok Hing Yuen	Private Sector Participation Scheme	1982

=== Fu Tai Estate ===
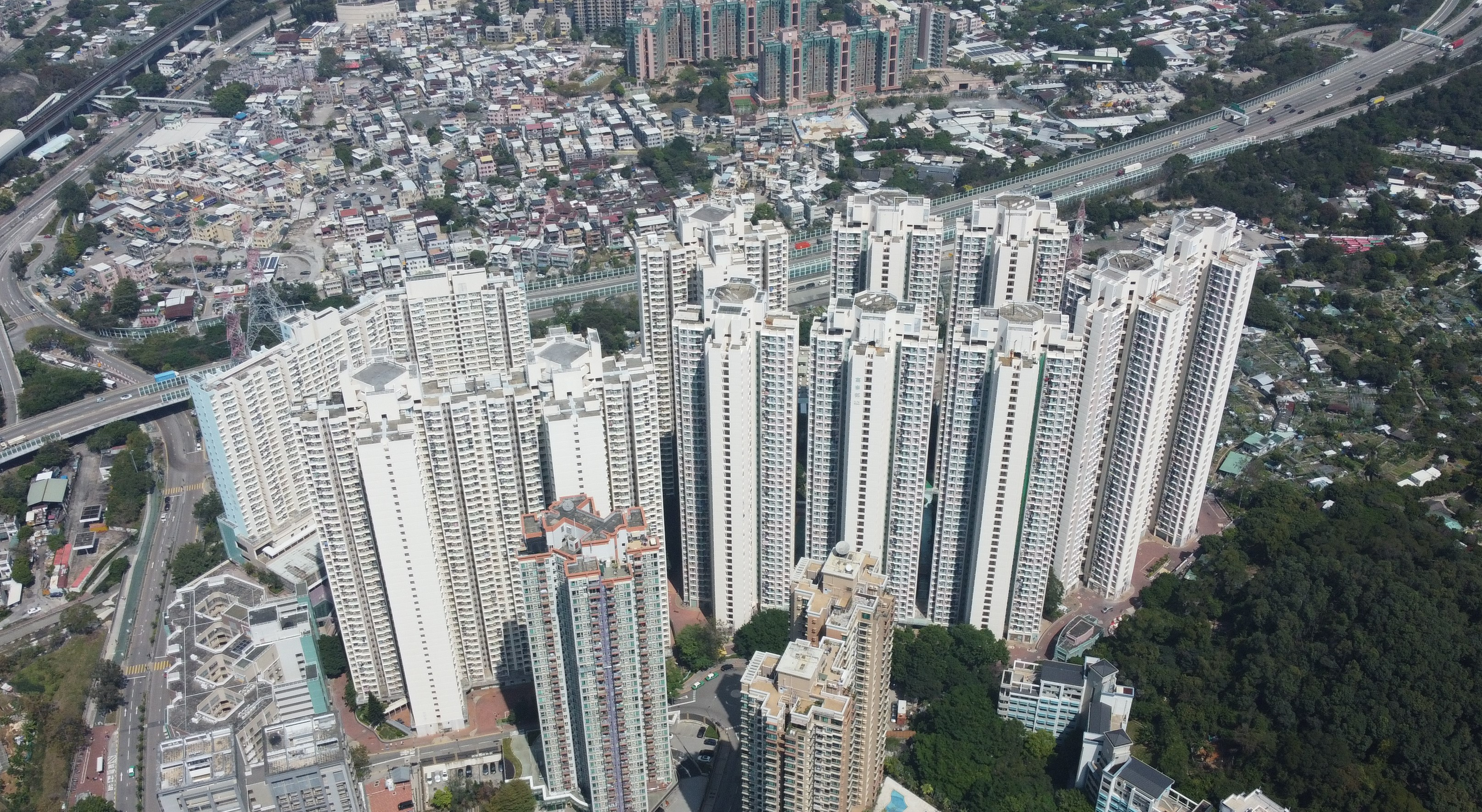
Fu Tai Estate

Fu Tai Estate (Chinese: 富泰邨) is located next to Lingnan University, consisting of 11 residential buildings completed in 2000 and 2001. It occupies the former site of Fu Tei Village (Chinese: 虎地村) and Fu Tei Camp (Chinese: 虎地軍營).

It is the only estate in Tuen Mun which is far away from any MTR Light Rail stops. Residents need to take MTR Bus to go to nearby Light Rail stops or West Rail stations.

Fu Tai Estate is in Primary One Admission (POA) School Net 71. Within the school net are multiple aided schools (operated independently but funded with government money); no government schools are in the school net.

English Name	Chinese Name	Type	Completion
Chung Tai House	頌泰樓	Concord 1	2000
Yat Tai House	逸泰樓	Concord 1	2000
Ning Tai House	寧泰樓	Concord 1	2000
Kin Tai House	健泰樓	Concord 1	2000
Yan Tai House	仁泰樓	Concord 1	2000
Yin Tai House	賢泰樓	Concord 1	2000
Ying Tai House	迎泰樓	Concord 1	2000
Kwan Tai House	君泰樓	Single Aspect Building	2001
Oi Tai House	愛泰樓	Harmony 1	2000
Sau Tai House	秀泰樓	Harmony 1	2000
Mei Tai House	美泰樓	Harmony 1	2000

=== Glorious Garden ===
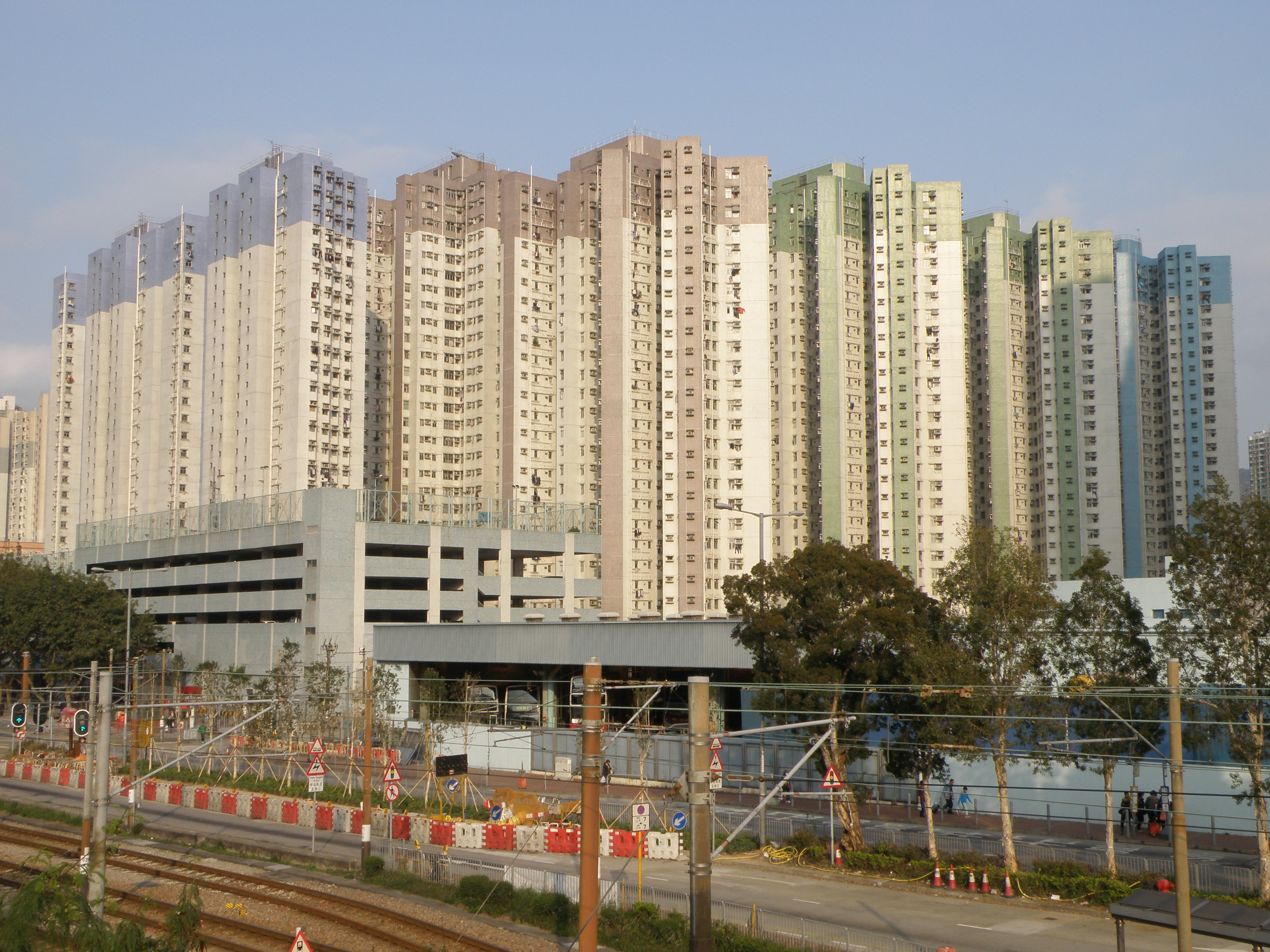
Glorious Garden

Glorious Garden (Chinese: 富健花園) is a Home Ownership Scheme and Private Sector Participation Scheme court in Tuen Mun, located at the reclaimed land in San Shek Wan and next to Lung Mun Oasis. It was jointly developed by Hong Kong Housing Authority and Chevalier Group. It consists of 12 residential blocks completed in 1999.

Name	Type	Completion
Block 1	Private Sector Participation Scheme	1999
Block 2	Private Sector Participation Scheme	1999
Block 3	Private Sector Participation Scheme	1999
Block 4	Private Sector Participation Scheme	1999
Block 5	Private Sector Participation Scheme	1999
Block 6	Private Sector Participation Scheme	1999
Block 7	Private Sector Participation Scheme	1999
Block 8	Private Sector Participation Scheme	1999
Block 9	Private Sector Participation Scheme	1999
Block 10	Private Sector Participation Scheme	1999
Block 11	Private Sector Participation Scheme	1999
Block 12	Private Sector Participation Scheme	1999

=== Kin Sang Estate ===
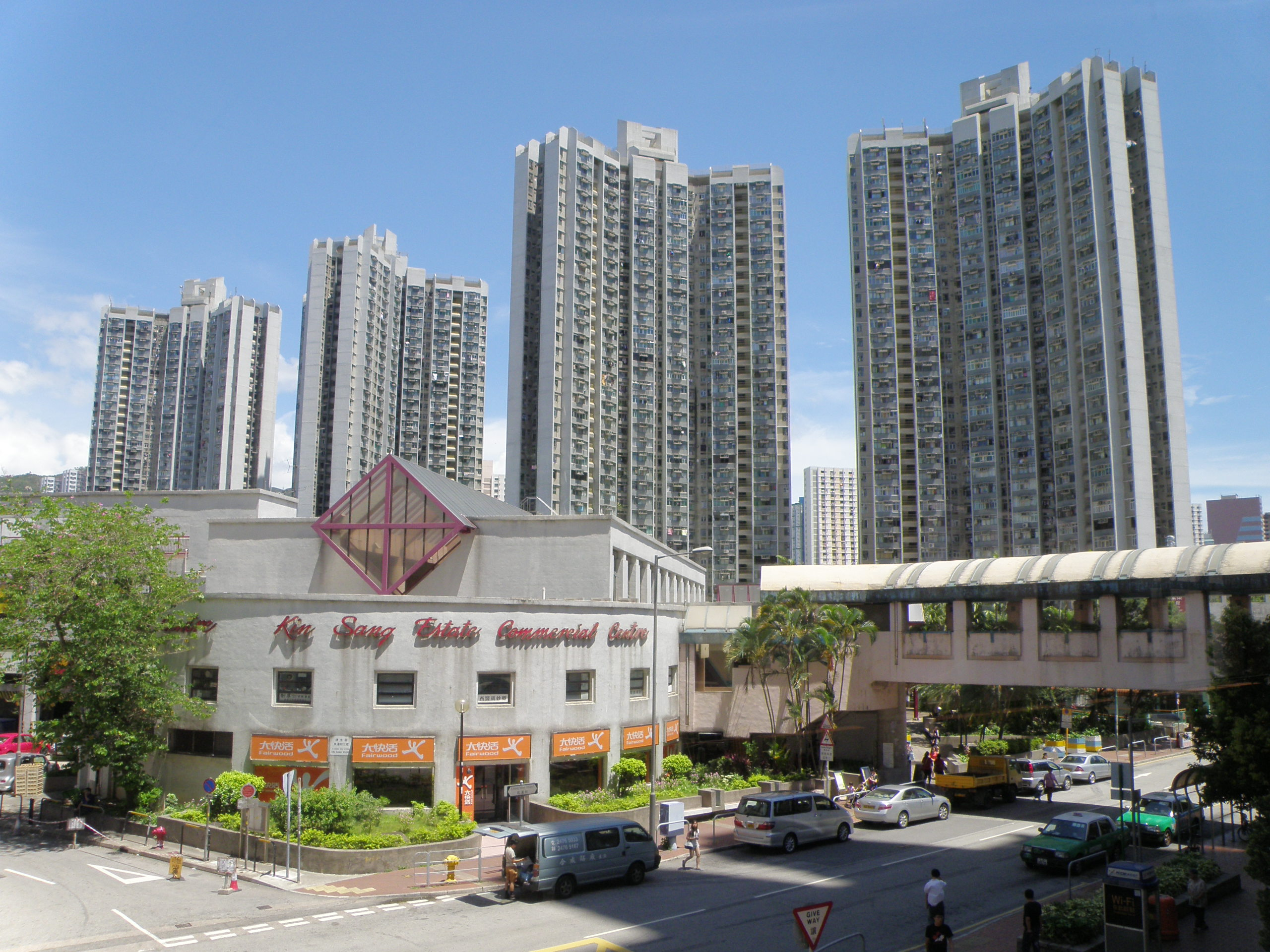
Kin Sang Estate

Kin Sang Estate (Chinese: 建生邨) is the eleventh public housing estate in Tuen Mun, located near Ching Chung Koon and Castle Peak Hospital. It consists of four residential buildings completed in 1989. In 1998, some of the flats were sold under Tenants Purchase Scheme Phase 1.

English Name	Chinese Name	Type	Completion
Hong Sang House	康生樓	Trident 4	1989
Lok Sang House	樂生樓	Trident 4	1989
Tai Sang House	泰生樓	Trident 4	1989
Yue Sang House	裕生樓	Trident 4	1989

=== Kingston Terrace ===
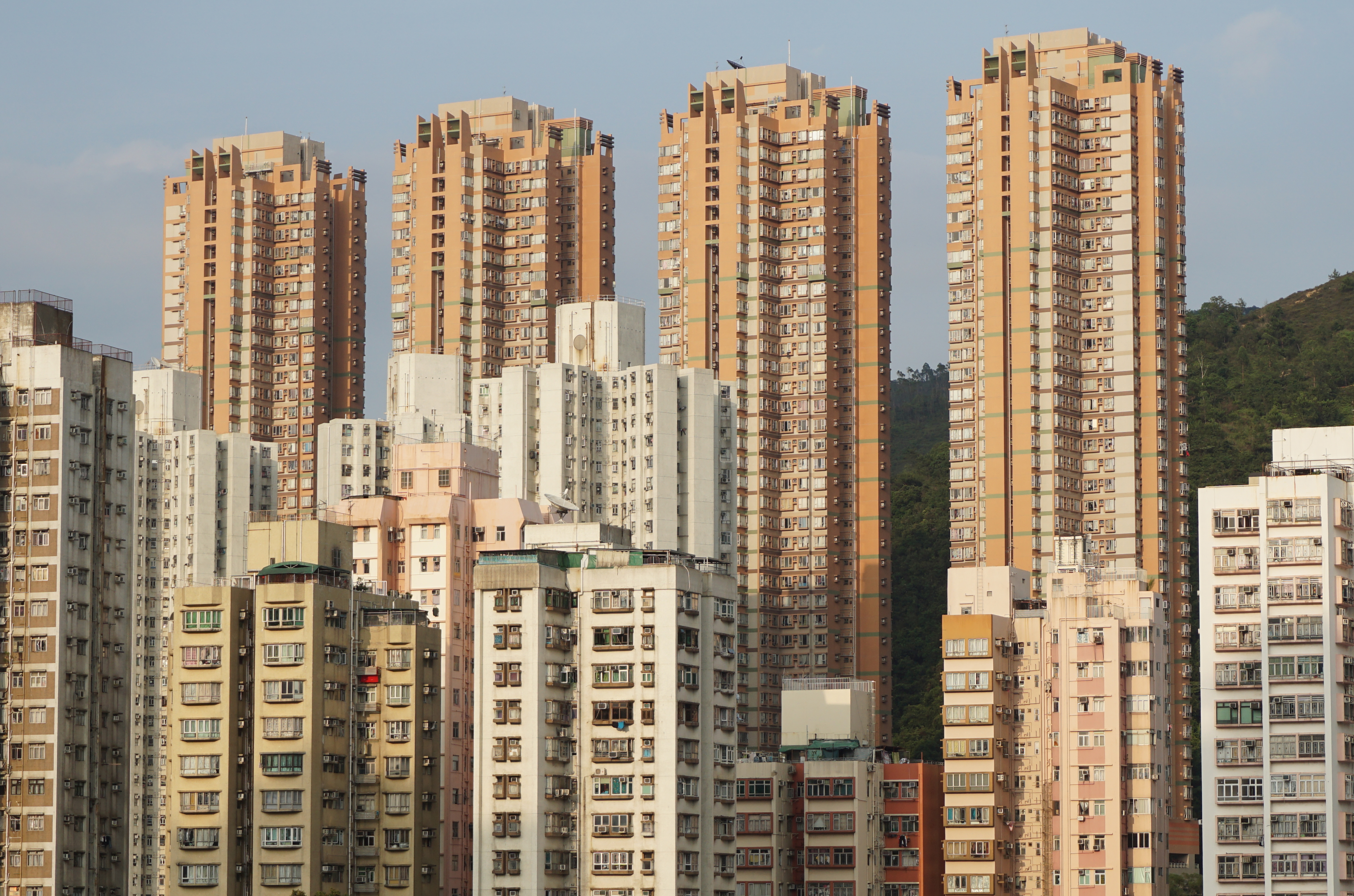
Kingston Terrace

Kingston Terrace (Chinese: 景新臺) is a Flat-for-Sale Scheme court in King San Path, Tuen Mun, near Light Rail Prime View stop. It consists of four blocks with 1,152 units built in 2002, developed by the Hong Kong Housing Society. The units were sold in two phases in 2007 (Block 3 and 4) and 2008 (Block 1 and 2) respectively.

Name	Type	Completion
Block 1	Flat-for-Sale Scheme	2002
Block 2	Flat-for-Sale Scheme	2002
Block 3	Flat-for-Sale Scheme	2002
Block 4	Flat-for-Sale Scheme	2002

=== Leung King Estate ===
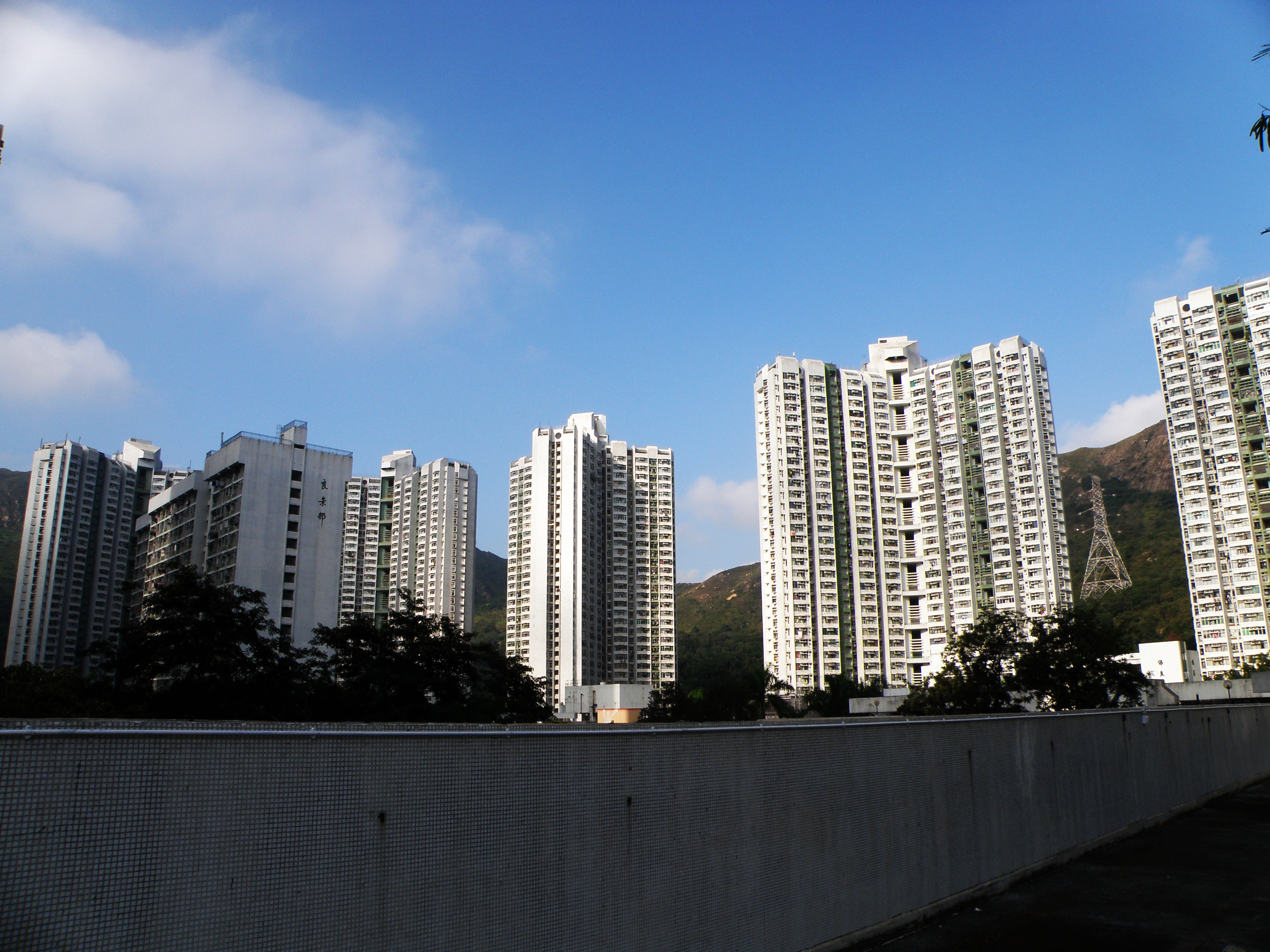
Leung King Estate

Leung King Estate (Chinese: 良景邨) is the ninth public housing estate in Tuen Mun, located in Northwest Tuen Mun. It consists of eight residential buildings completed in 1988. The estate was formerly the site of Leung Tin Village and it was named for the village, as was the nearby Tin King Estate. In 2001, some of the flats in the estate were sold under Tenants Purchase Scheme Phase 4.

Leung King Estate is in Primary One Admission (POA) School Net 70. Within the school net are multiple aided schools (operated independently but funded with government money) and the following government schools: Tuen Mun Government Primary School (屯門官立小學).

Name	Type	Completion
Leung Wah House	Trident 3	1988
Leung Yin House	Trident 3	1988
Leung Shui House	Trident 3	1988
Leung Chun House	Trident 3	1988
Leung Wai House	Trident 3	1988
Leung Kit House	Trident 4	1988
Leung Ying House	Trident 4	1988
Leung Chi House	New Slab	1988

=== Lung Mun Oasis ===
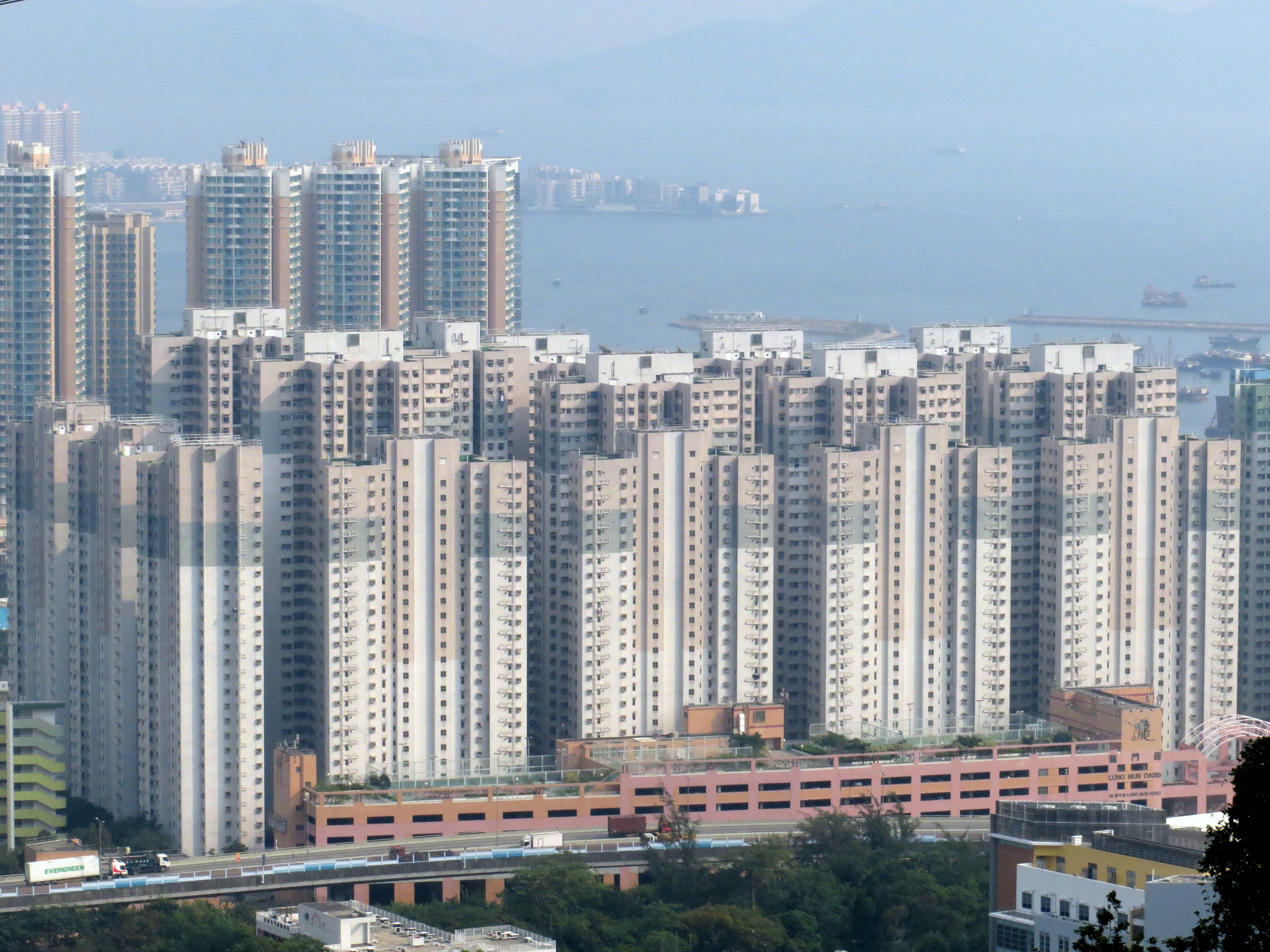
Lung Mun Oasis

Lung Mun Oasis (Chinese: 龍門居) is a Home Ownership Scheme and Private Sector Participation Scheme court in Tuen Mun, located at the reclaimed land of San Shek Wan and near Glorious Garden. It consists of 16 residential buildings completed in 1998. Light Rail Lung Mun stop and a bus terminus are located at Lung Mun Oasis.

Name	Type	Completion
Block 1	Private Sector Participation Scheme	1998
Block 2	Private Sector Participation Scheme	1998
Block 3	Private Sector Participation Scheme	1998
Block 4	Private Sector Participation Scheme	1998
Block 5	Private Sector Participation Scheme	1998
Block 6	Private Sector Participation Scheme	1998
Block 7	Private Sector Participation Scheme	1998
Block 8	Private Sector Participation Scheme	1998
Block 9	Private Sector Participation Scheme	1998
Block 10	Private Sector Participation Scheme	1998
Block 11	Private Sector Participation Scheme	1998
Block 12	Private Sector Participation Scheme	1998
Block 13	Private Sector Participation Scheme	1998
Block 14	Private Sector Participation Scheme	1998
Block 15	Private Sector Participation Scheme	1998
Block 16	Private Sector Participation Scheme	1998

=== Lung Yat Estate ===
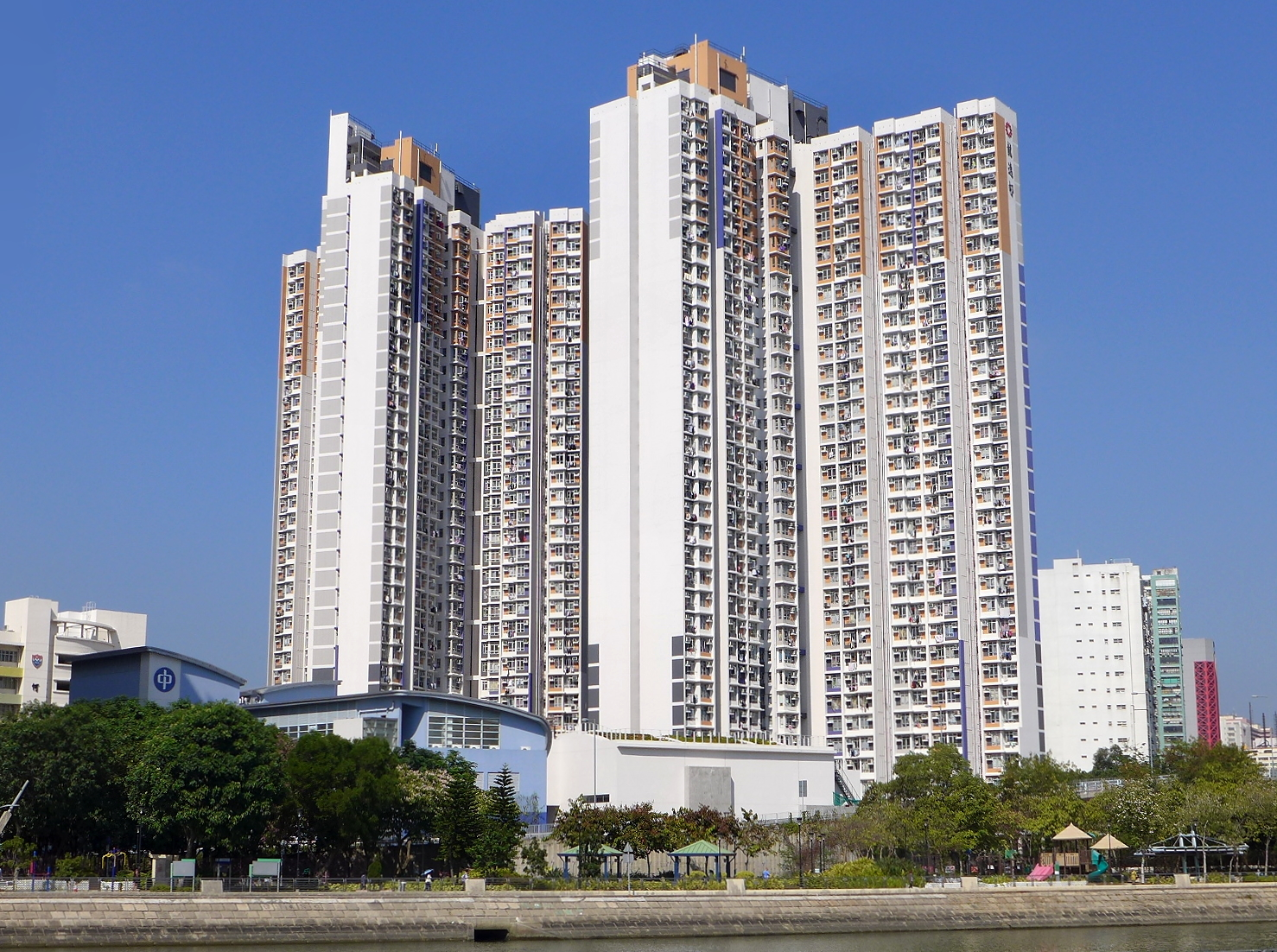
Lung Yat Estate

Lung Yat Estate (Chinese: 龍逸邨) is a public rental estate completed in 2013. It comprises two residential blocks and a community building. The 34-storey blocks collectively provide 990 flats for an estimated 2,800 people.

Name	Type	Completion
Kin Lung House	Non-standard	2013
Hong Lung House	Non-standard	2013

=== Melody Garden ===
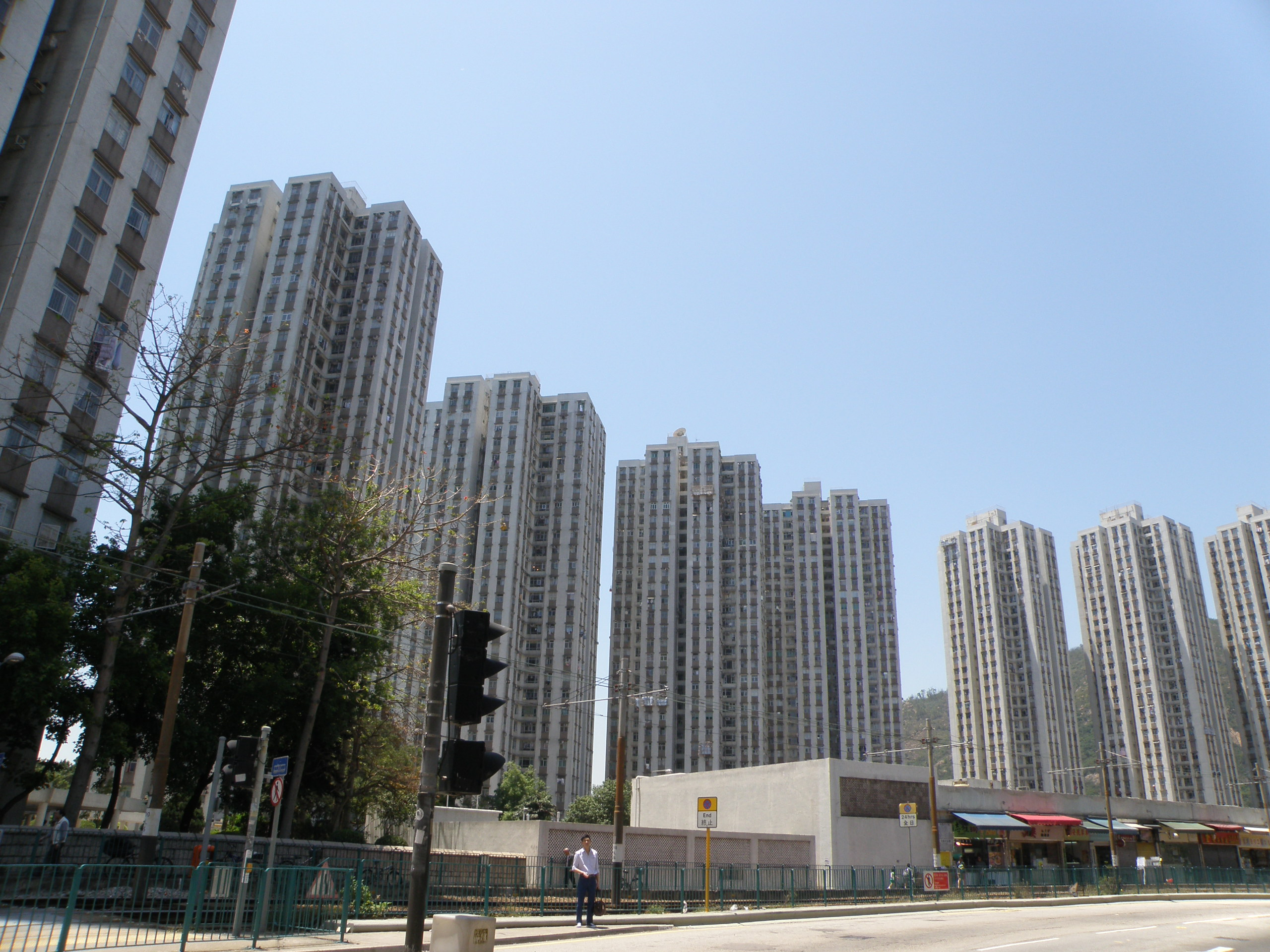
Melody Garden

Melody Garden (Chinese: 美樂花園) is a Home Ownership Scheme and Private Sector Participation Scheme court in Tuen Mun, located at the reclaimed land of Castle Peak Bay near Butterfly Estate. It was the first and the only "Middle Income Housing Scheme" developed by the Hong Kong Housing Authority. It has 10 blocks built in 1984 and it was the first HOS court in Tuen Mun Ferry Pier region.

Name	Type	Completion
Block 1	Middle Income Housing Scheme	1984
Block 2	Middle Income Housing Scheme	1984
Block 3	Middle Income Housing Scheme	1984
Block 4	Middle Income Housing Scheme	1984
Block 5	Middle Income Housing Scheme	1984
Block 6	Middle Income Housing Scheme	1984
Block 7	Middle Income Housing Scheme	1984
Block 8	Middle Income Housing Scheme	1984
Block 9	Middle Income Housing Scheme	1984
Block 10	Middle Income Housing Scheme	1984

=== On Ting Estate ===
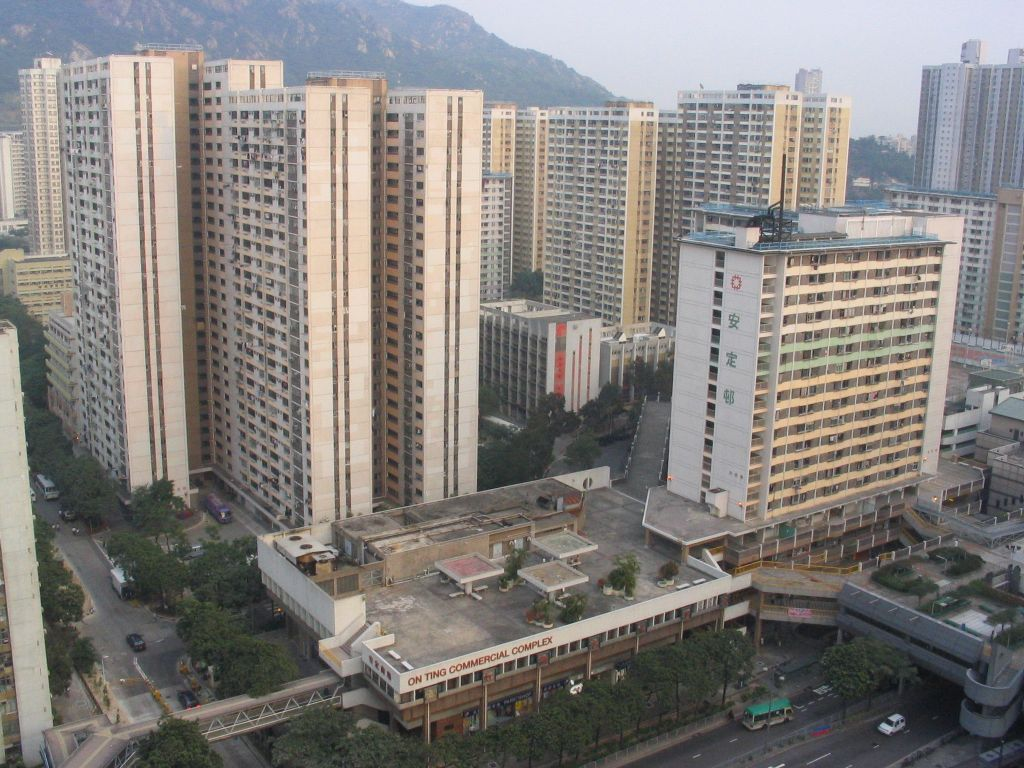
On Ting Estate

On Ting Estate (Chinese: 安定邨) is the fifth public housing estate in Tuen Mun completed between 1980 and 1982. It consists of 6 residential blocks, and is built on reclaimed land of Castle Peak Bay Major renovation works were carried out in the estate in 2003.

Name	Type	Completion
Ting Lung House	Double H	1980
Ting Hong House	Double H	1981
Ting Fuk House	Double H	1981
Ting Tai House	Old Slab	1981
Ting Tak House	Old Slab	1981
Ting Cheung House	Old Slab	1982

On Ting Estate is in Primary One Admission (POA) School Net 71. Within the school net are multiple aided schools (operated independently but funded with government money); no government schools are in the school net.

=== Po Tin Estate ===
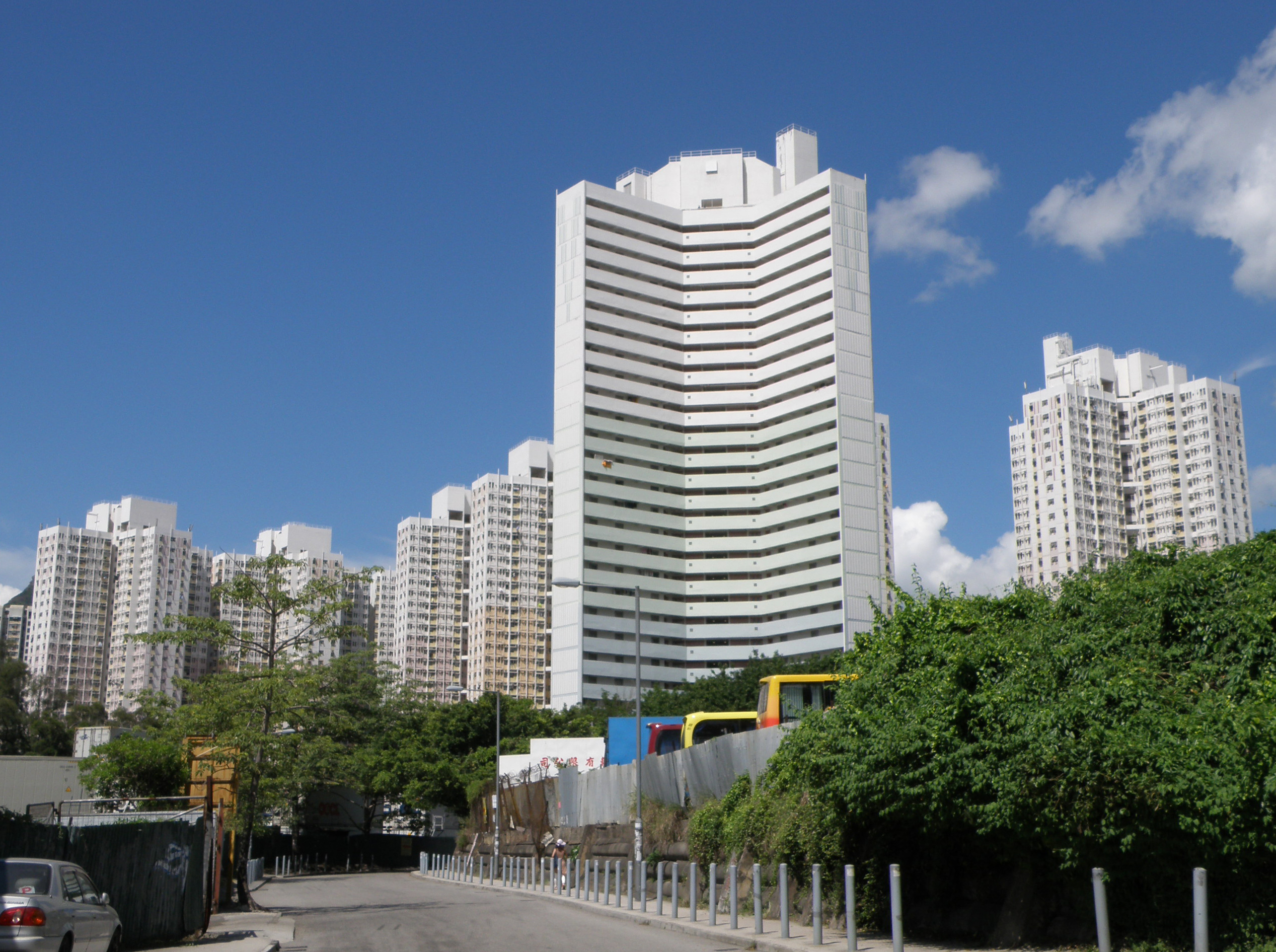
Po Tin Estate

Po Tin Estate (Chinese: 寶田邨) is the twelfth public housing estate in Tuen Mun. It was built as interim housing which consists of 9 residential blocks completed in 2000. Six buildings of the estate with about 4,100 flats were changed into a public housing estate in 2004.

Name	Type	Completion
Block 1	Interim housing	2000
Block 2	Interim housing	2000
Block 3	Interim housing	2000
Block 4	Public housing estate	2000
Block 5	Public housing estate	2000
Block 6	Public housing estate	2000
Block 7	Public housing estate	2000
Block 8	Public housing estate	2000
Block 9	Public housing estate	2000

Its facilities and flat sizes are found unsatisfactory since its standard is much lower than that in other public housing estates.

=== Prime View Garden ===
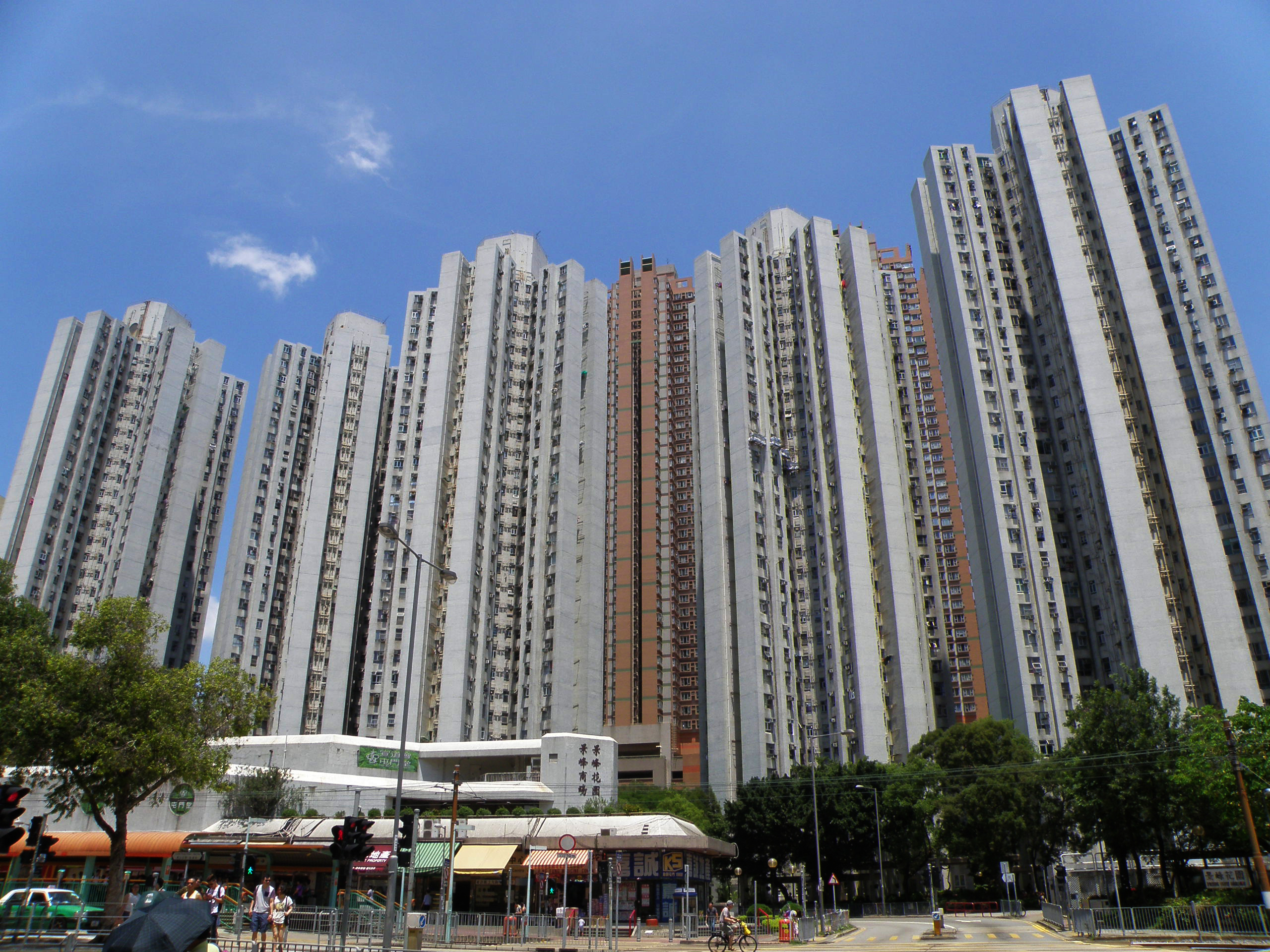
Prime View Garden

Prime View Garden (Chinese: 景峰花園) is a Home Ownership Scheme and Private Sector Participation Scheme court in Castle Peak Road (San Hui Section), Tuen Mun. It was jointly developed by the Hong Kong Housing Authority and New World Development in 1985. It has totally five blocks.

Name	Type	Completion
Block 1	Private Sector Participation Scheme	1985
Block 2	Private Sector Participation Scheme	1985
Block 3	Private Sector Participation Scheme	1985
Block 4	Private Sector Participation Scheme	1985
Block 5	Private Sector Participation Scheme	1985

Prime View Garden is in Primary One Admission (POA) School Net 71. Within the school net are multiple aided schools (operated independently but funded with government money); no government schools are in the school net.

=== Sam Shing Estate ===
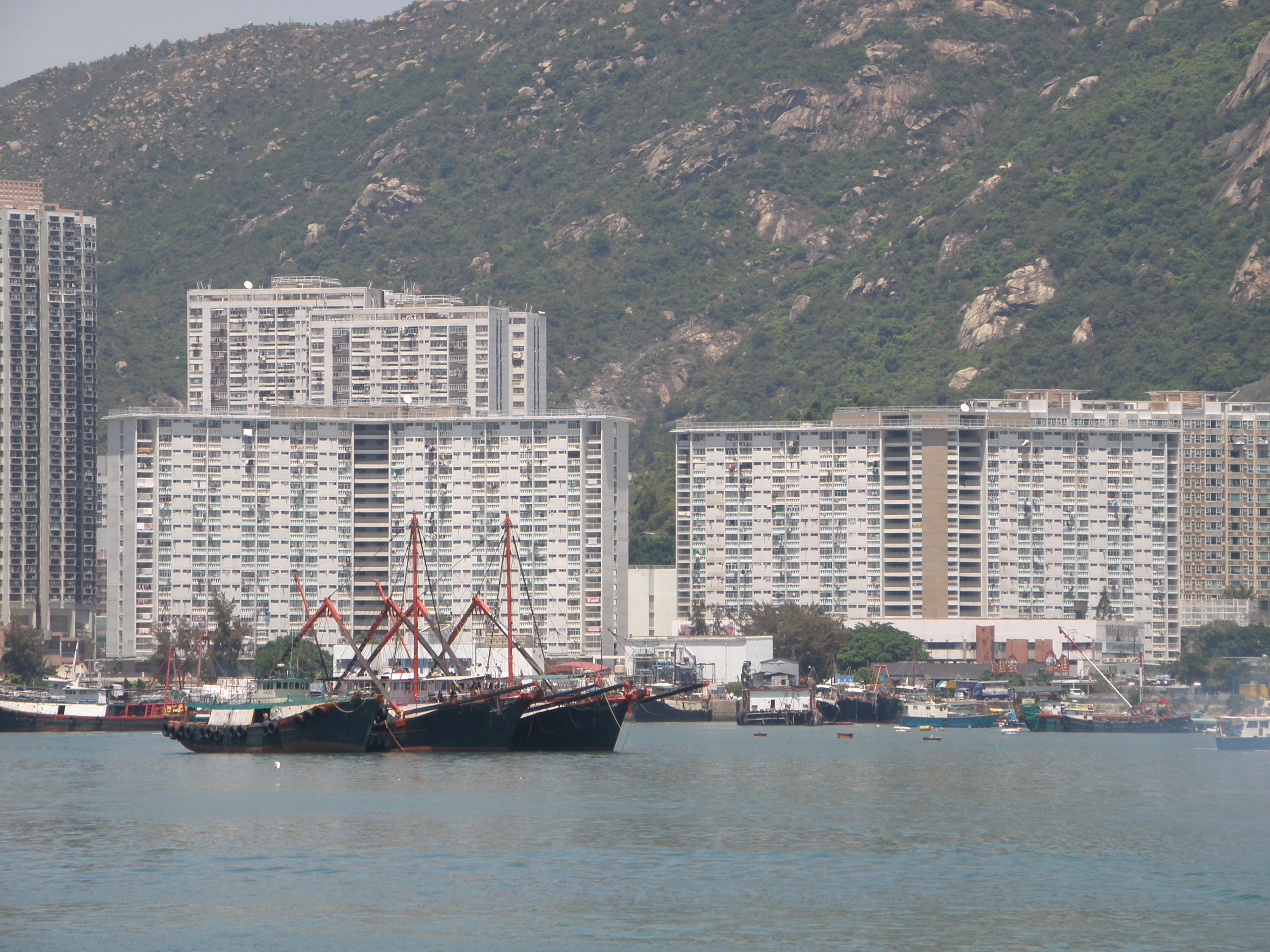
Sam Shing Estate

Sam Shing Estate (Chinese: 三聖邨) is the third public housing estate in Tuen Mun. is a public housing estate in Tuen Mun, New Territories, Hong Kong. It Built on the reclaimed land of Castle Peak Bay, the estate consists of 3 residential blocks completed in 1980. It was named for nearby Sam Shing Hui, a fishing village in the district, and most of the residents in the estate were fishermen.

Name	Type	Completion
Chun Yu House	Double H	1980
Fung Yu House	Old Slab	1980
Moon Yu House	Old Slab	1980

=== San Wai Court ===
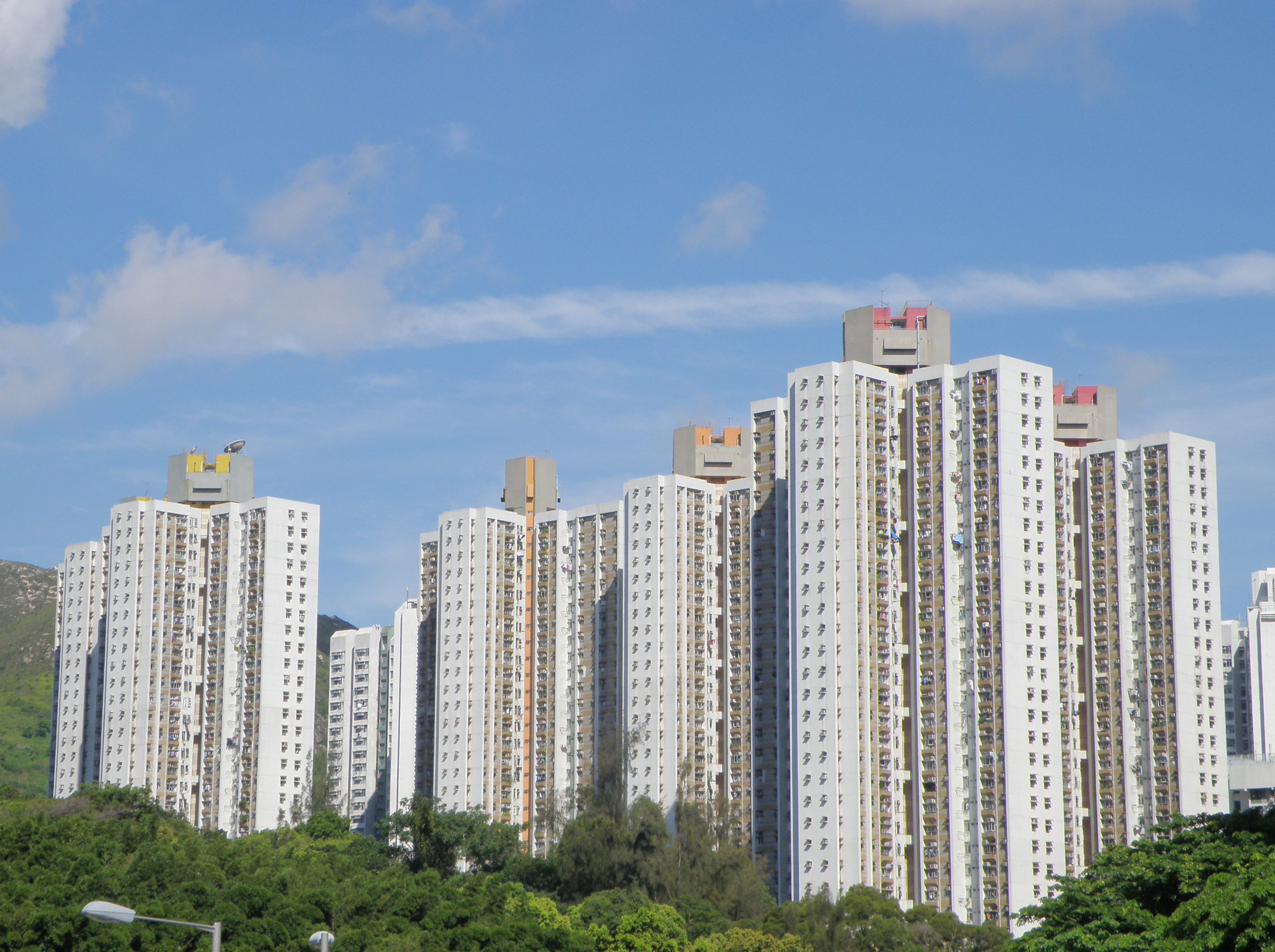
San Wai Court

San Wai Court (Chinese: 新圍苑) is a Home Ownership Scheme court in Tuen Mun, located near Castle Peak and Tsing Shan Monastery. Formerly the old site of Leung Tin Village (Chinese: 良田村), the estate consists of six residential blocks completed in 1989. It is named from the nearby San Wai Chai (Chinese: 新圍仔) and it is the only HOS court in Tuen Mun which is not named with the prefix "Siu" (Chinese: 兆). Light Rail San Wai stop is located at San Wai Court and it is named from the court.

Name	Type	Completion
San Yin House	NCB (Ver.1984)	1989
San Shun House	NCB (Ver.1984)	1989
San Bik House	NCB (Ver.1984)	1989
San Hoi House	NCB (Ver.1984)	1989
San Woon House	NCB (Ver.1984)	1989
San Pui House	NCB (Ver.1984)	1989

=== Shan King Estate ===
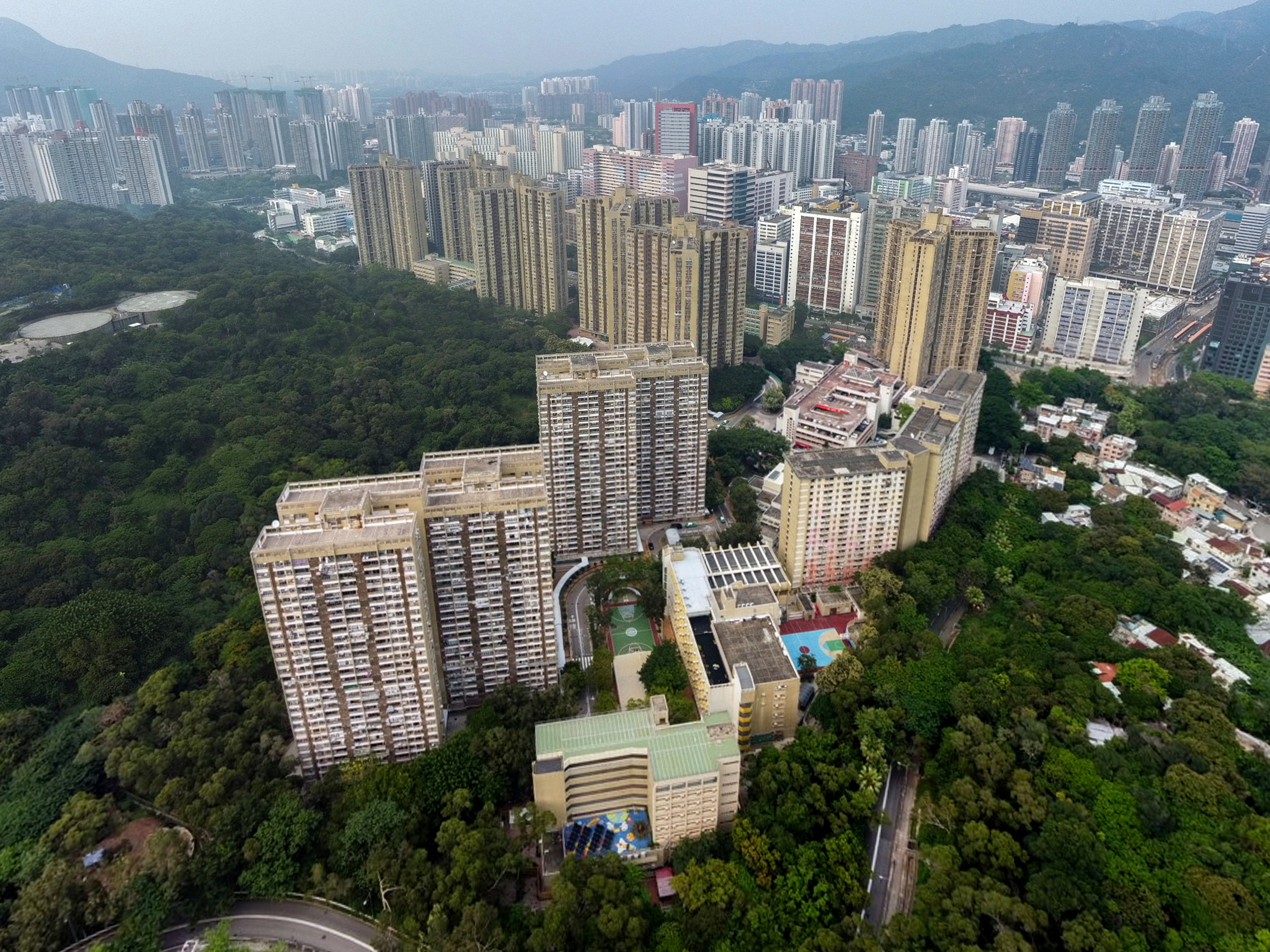
Shan King Estate

Shan King Estate (Chinese: 山景邨) is the eighth public housing estate in Tuen Mun. The estate consists of 6 residential blocks completed in 1983 and 1986 respectively, offering totally 8644 units. Some of the units were sold to the tenants in Tenants Purchase Scheme Phase 6A.

Shan King Estate is in Primary One Admission (POA) School Net 70. Within the school net are multiple aided schools (operated independently but funded with government money) and the following government schools: Tuen Mun Government Primary School (屯門官立小學).

Name	Type	Completion
King Wing House	Old Slab	1983
King Fu House	Double H	1983
King Kwai House	Double H	1983
King Wah House	Trident 1	1986
King Mei House	Trident 1	1986
King Lai House	Trident 1	1986
King On House	Trident 2	1986
King Lok House	Trident 2	1986
King Yip House	Trident 2	1986

=== Siu Shan Court ===
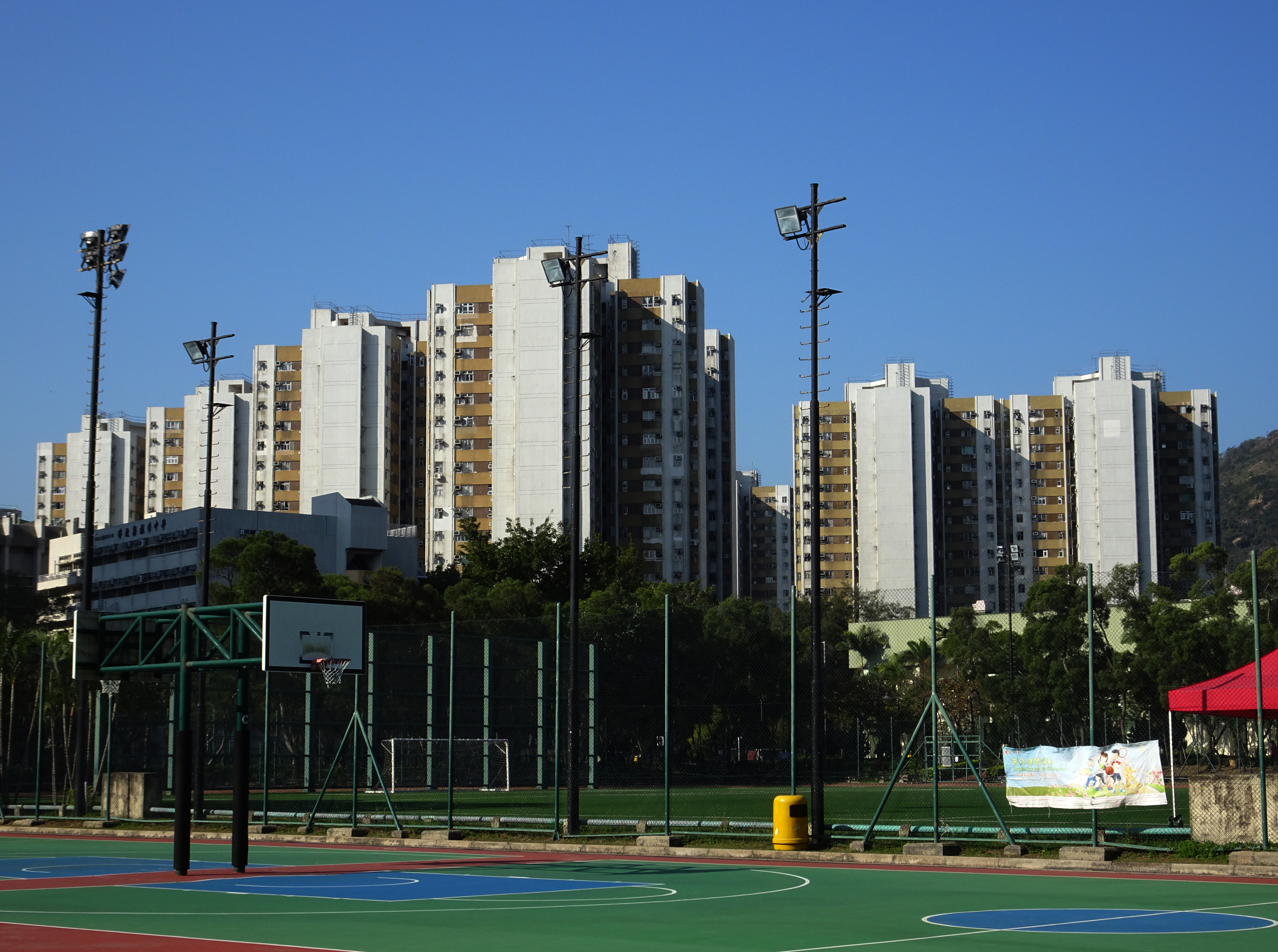
Siu Shan Court

Siu Shan Court (Chinese: 兆山苑) is a Home Ownership Scheme court on the reclaimed land of Castle Peak Bay in Tuen Mun South, near Wu King Estate and Butterfly Estate. It comprises 12 blocks built in 1983.

Name	Type	Completion
Min King House	Old Cruciform	1983
Cheung King House	Old Cruciform	1983
Pak King House	Old Cruciform	1983
Kwai King House	Old Cruciform	1983
Wah King House	Old Cruciform	1983
Hang King House	Old Cruciform	1983
Yeung King House	Old Cruciform	1983
Yeh King House	Old Cruciform	1983
Kin King House	Old Cruciform	1983
Lau King House	Old Cruciform	1983
Yue King House	Old Cruciform	1983
Tao King House	Old Cruciform	1983

=== Siu Hei Court ===
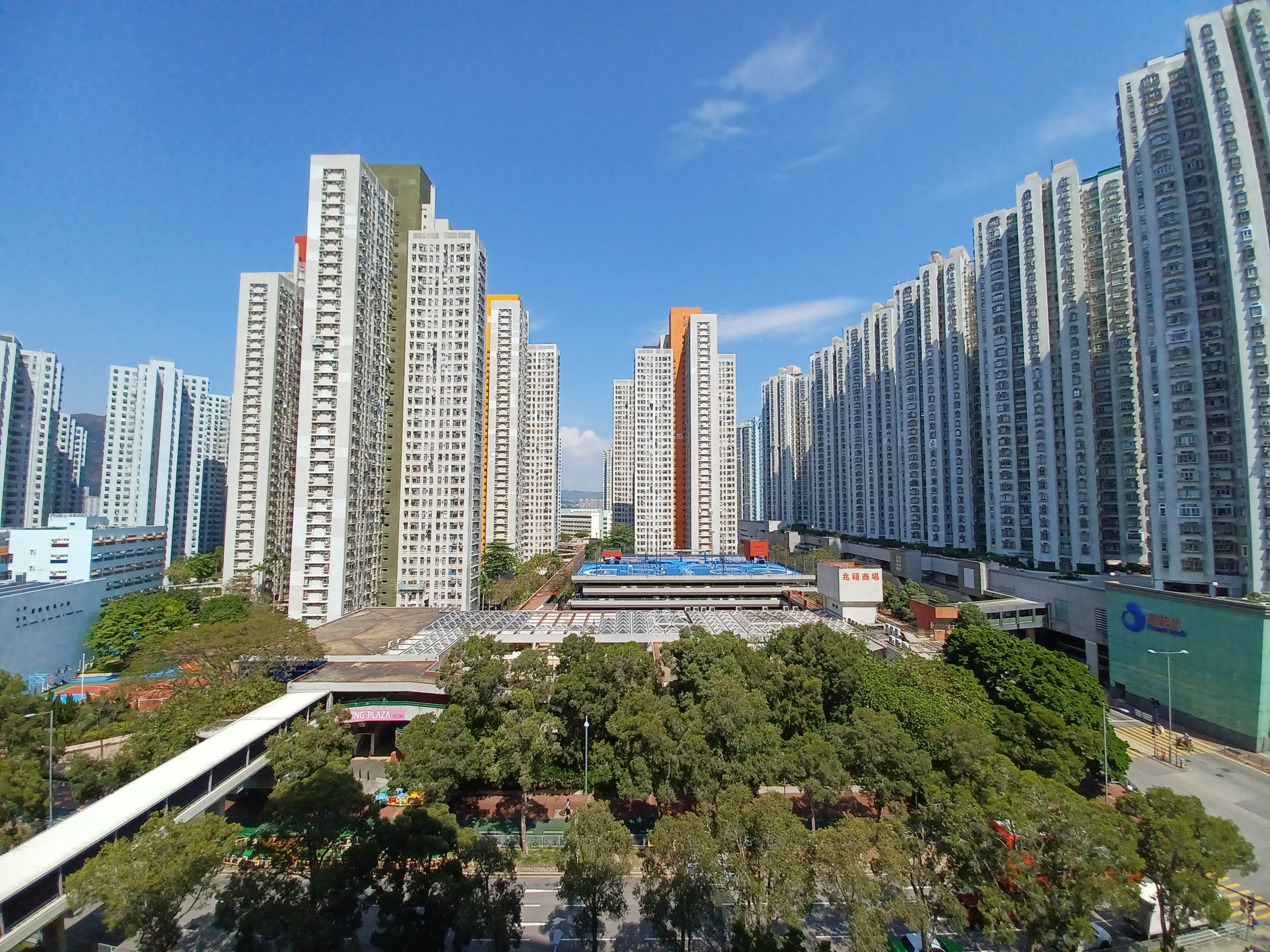
Siu Hei Court

Siu Hei Court (Chinese: 兆禧苑) is a Home Ownership Scheme court on the reclaimed land of Castle Peak Bay in Tuen Mun South, near Tuen Mun Ferry Pier, Wu King Estate, Yuet Wu Villa, Pierhead Garden and Richland Garden. It comprises 5 blocks built in 1985.

Name	Type	Completion
On Hei House	Windmill	1985
Wan Hei House	Windmill	1985
Shun Hei House	Windmill	1985
Nga Hei House	Windmill	1985
Lok Hei House	Windmill	1985

=== Siu Kwai Court ===
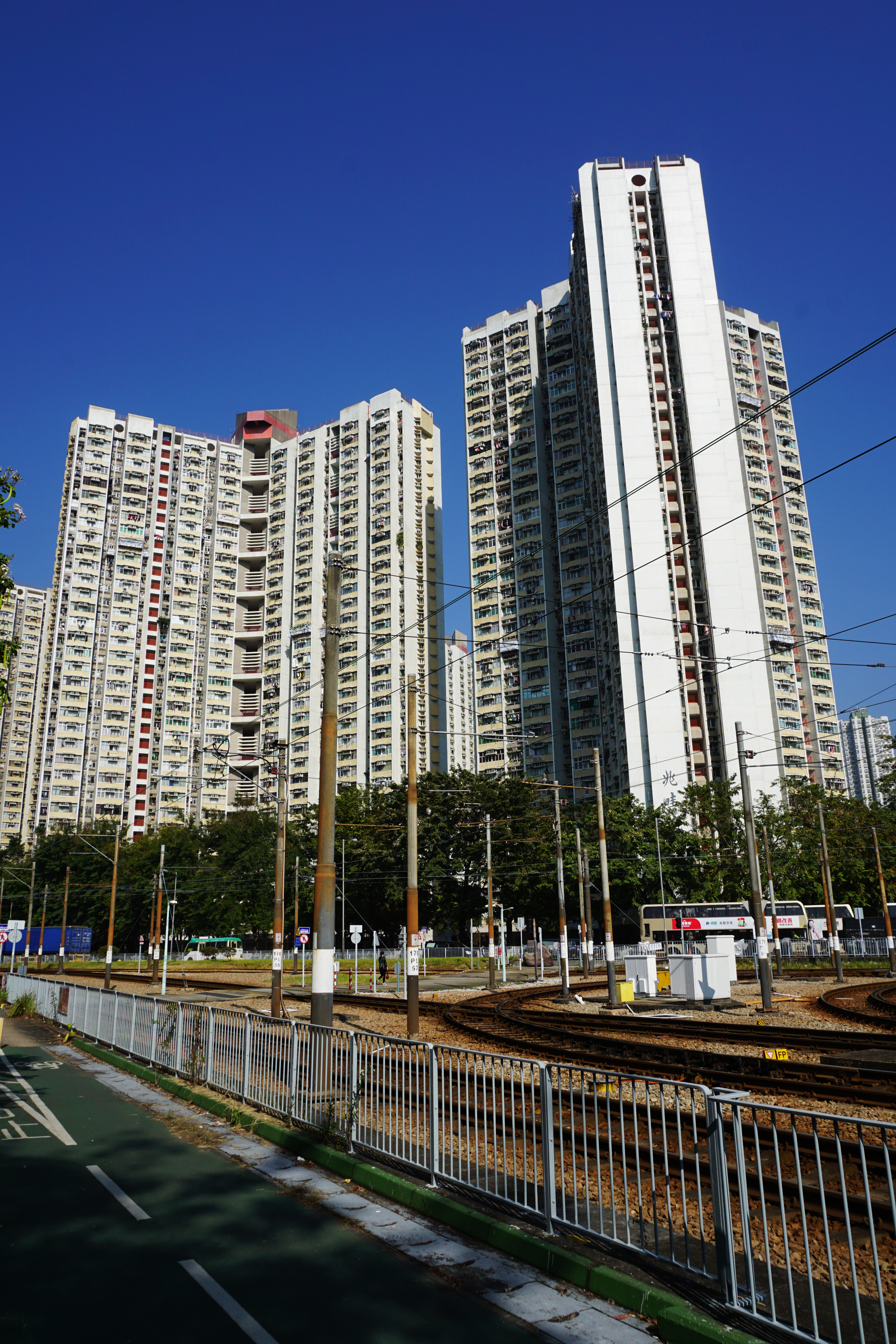
Siu Kwai Court

Siu Kwai Court (Chinese: 兆畦苑) is a Home Ownership Scheme court in Tuen Mun, near Tin King Estate. It consists of two blocks built in 1990.

Name	Type	Completion
Siu Keung House	Trident 3	1990
Siu Fu House	Trident 4	1990

=== Siu Hin Court ===
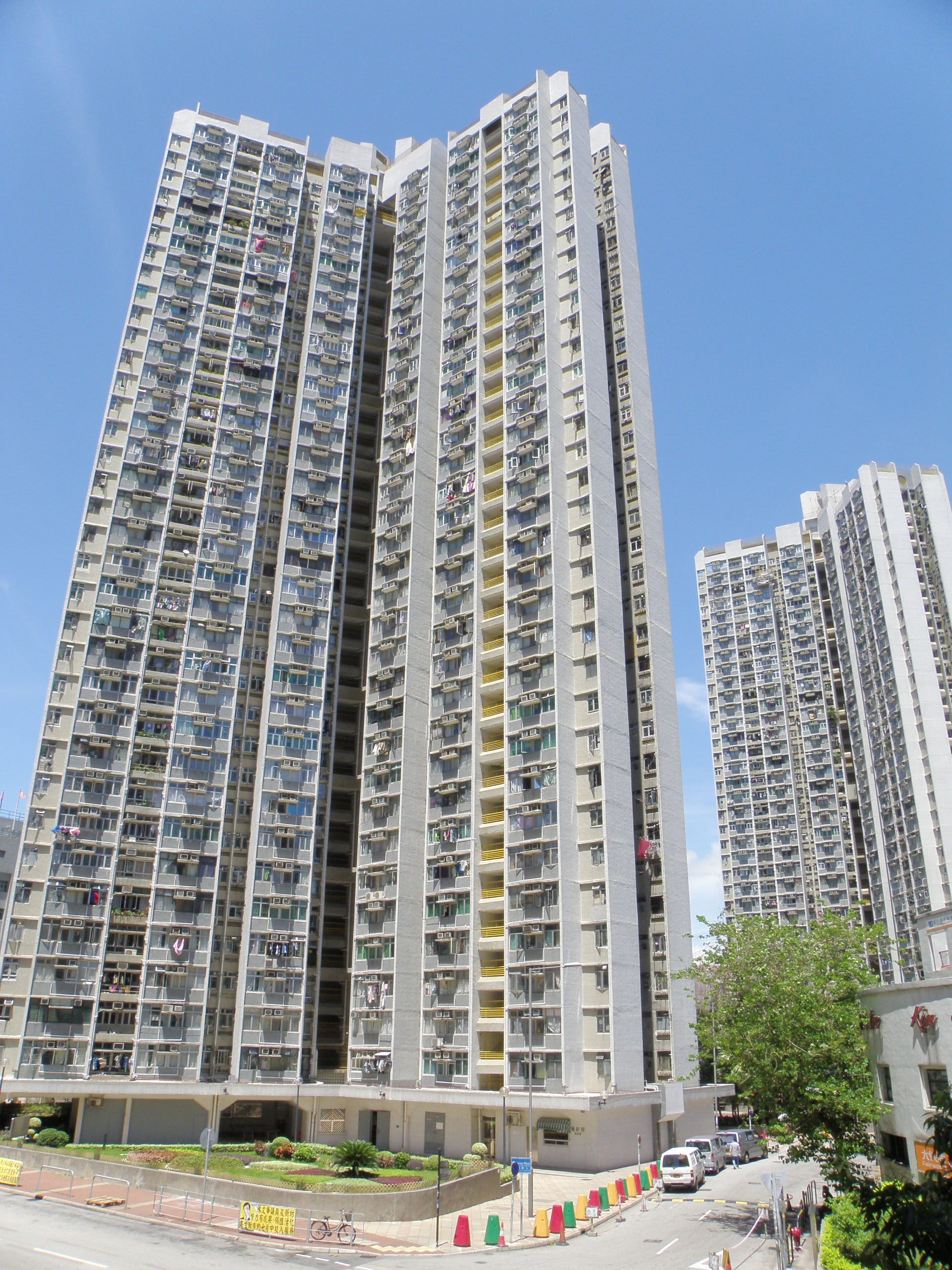
Siu Hin Court

Siu Hin Court (Chinese: 兆軒苑) is a Home Ownership Scheme court in Tuen Mun, near Kin Sang Estate. It has 2 blocks built in 1991. The two blocks were originally planned for rental housing of Kin Sang Estate, but their flats were finally converted to HOS to be sold to public.

Name	Type	Completion
Shun Sang House	Trident 4	1991
Yat Sang House	Trident 4	1991

=== Siu Lun Court ===
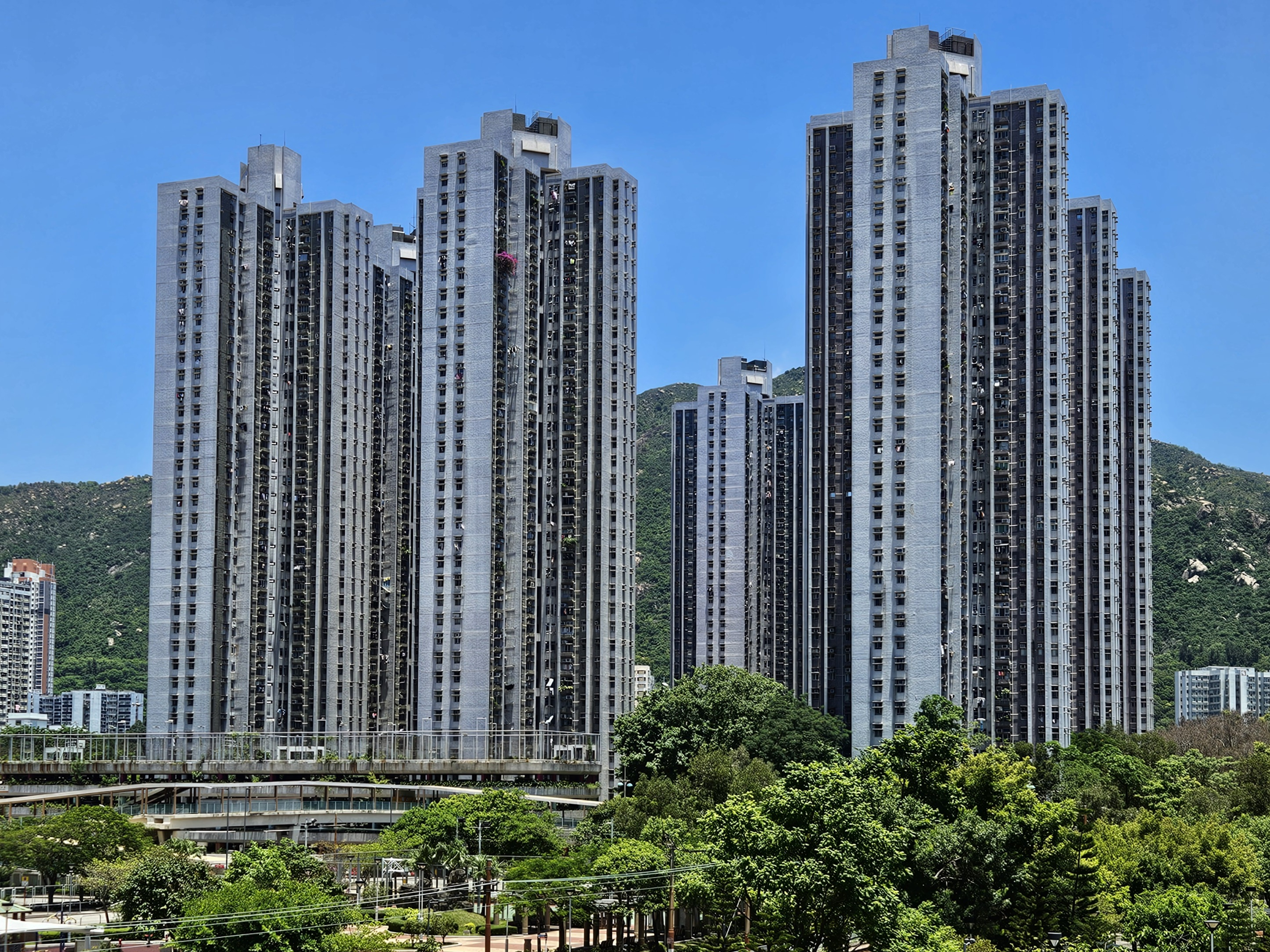
Siu Lun Court

Siu Lun Court (Chinese: 兆麟苑) is a Home Ownership Scheme court on the reclaimed land between Castle Peak Bay and Lo Shue Chau in Tuen Mun South. It comprises 12 blocks completed in 1993.

Name	Type	Completion
Ngan Lun House	NCB (Ver.1984)	1993
Po Lun House	NCB (Ver.1984)	1993
Tsui Lun House	NCB (Ver.1984)	1993
Yiu Lun House	NCB (Ver.1984)	1993
Sui Lun House	NCB (Ver.1984)	1993
Ka Lun House	NCB (Ver.1984)	1993
Fu Lun House	NCB (Ver.1984)	1993
Kwai Lun House	NCB (Ver.1984)	1993
Wing Lun House	NCB (Ver.1984)	1993
Yuk Lun House	NCB (Ver.1984)	1993
Fai Lun House	NCB (Ver.1984)	1993
Wah Lun House	NCB (Ver.1984)	1993

=== Siu Lung Court ===
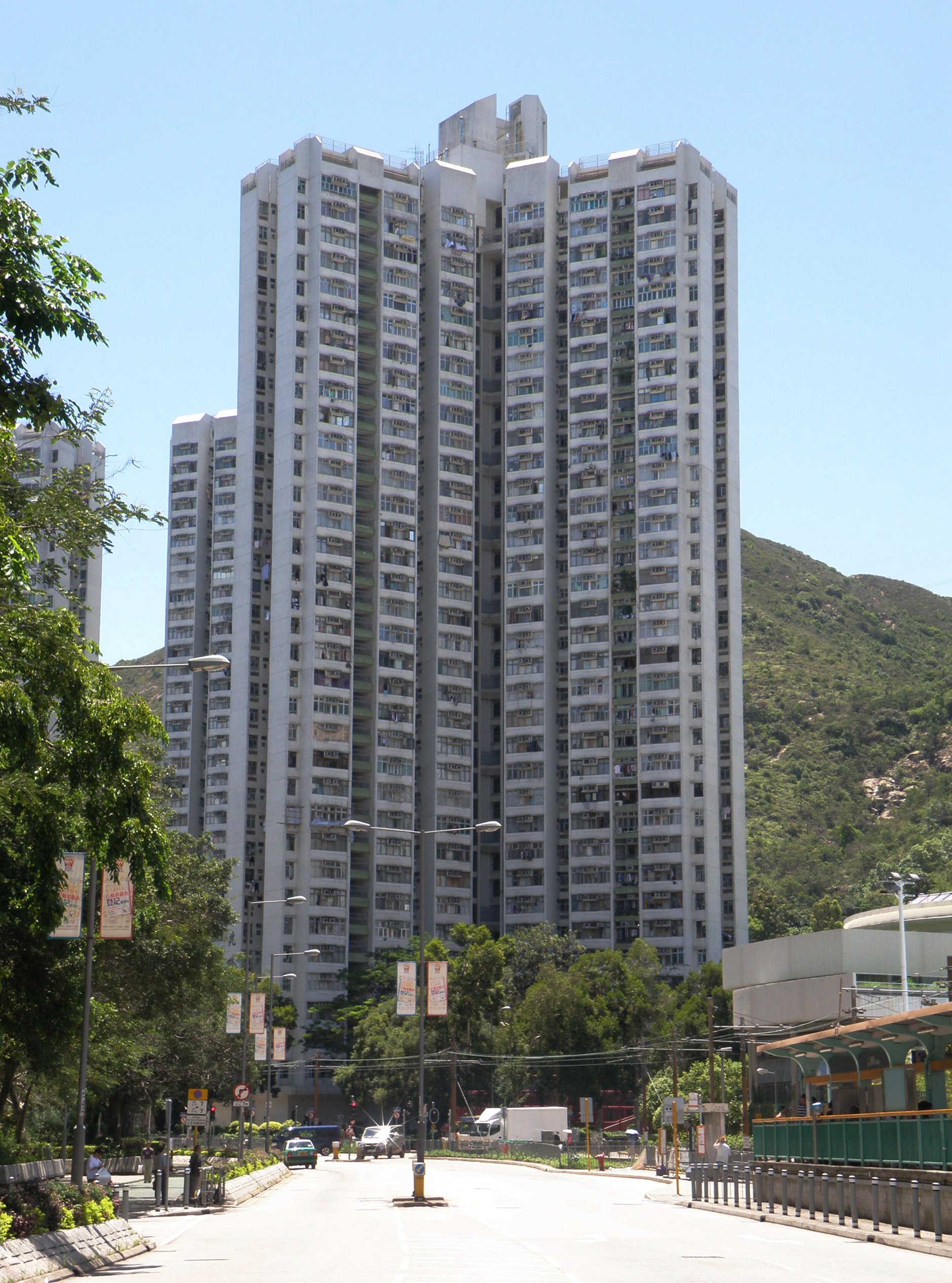
Siu Lung Court

Siu Lung Court (Chinese: 兆隆苑) is a Home Ownership Scheme court in Tuen Mun, near Leung King Estate. It has only 1 block built in 1991.

Name	Type	Completion
Siu Lung Court	Trident 4	1991

=== Siu Hong Court ===
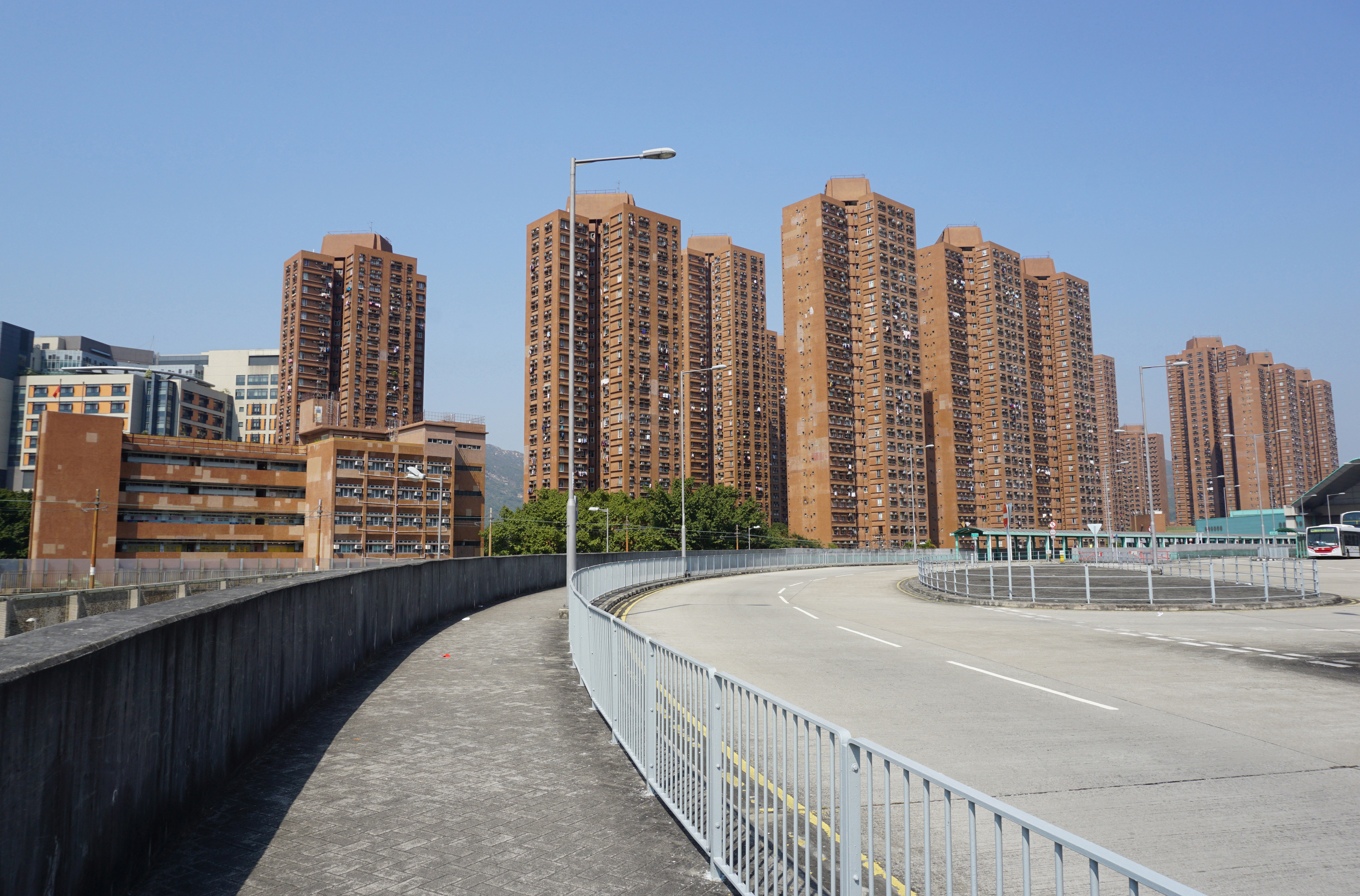
Siu Hong Court

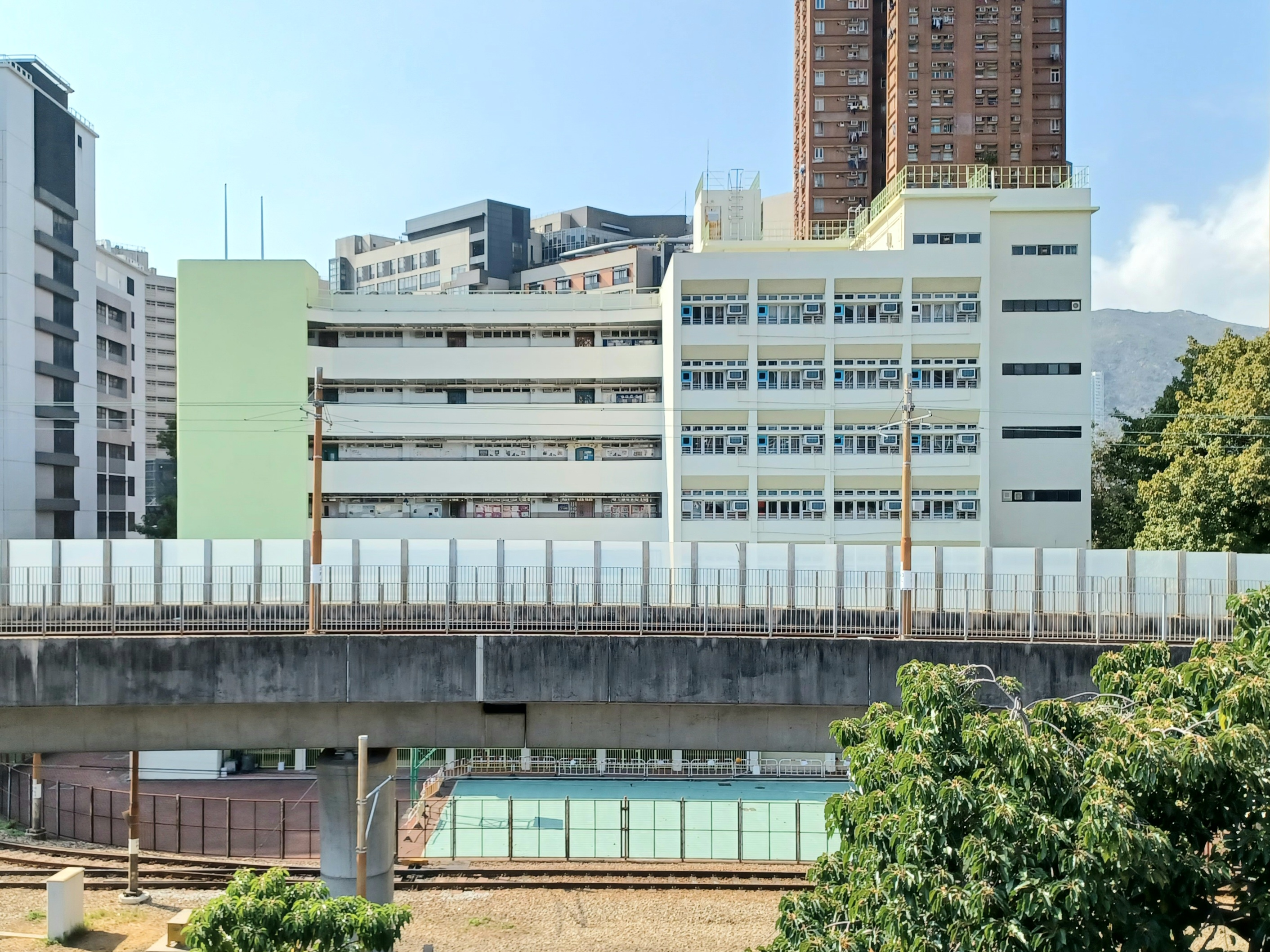
Tuen Mun Government Primary School

Siu Hong Court (Chinese: 兆康苑) is a Home Ownership Scheme court in Tuen Mun, located near Tuen Mun Hospital, Ching Chung Koon, Castle Peak Hospital and MTR Siu Hong station. It consists of 20 residential buildings completed in 1982 and 1985 respectively. It is the first HOS court in Tuen Mun, and was the largest-scale HOS estate in Hong Kong. In 1985, it won a silver medal in Hong Kong Institute of Architects Annual Awards.

Siu Hong Court is in Primary One Admission (POA) School Net 70. Within the school net are multiple aided schools (operated independently but funded with government money) and the following government schools: Tuen Mun Government Primary School (屯門官立小學).

Name	Type	Completion
Siu Yin House	Flexi 1	1982
Siu Sun House	Flexi 1	1982
Siu Chun House	Flexi 1	1982
Siu Kit House	Flexi 1	1982
Siu Wai House	Flexi 1	1982
Siu Kin House	Flexi 1	1982
Siu Yan House	Flexi 1	1982
Siu Wing House	Flexi 1	1982
Siu Wah House	Flexi 1	1982
Siu Hang House	Flexi 2	1984
Siu Shun House	Flexi 2	1984
Siu Cheong House	Flexi 2	1984
Siu Ho House	Flexi 2	1984
Siu Ping House	Flexi 2	1984
Siu Fai House	Flexi 2	1984
Siu Lok House	Flexi 2	1984
Siu Lai House	Flexi 2	1984
Siu Kei House	Flexi 2	1984
Siu Ning House	Flexi 2	1984
Siu Tai House	Flexi 2	1984

=== Siu On Court ===
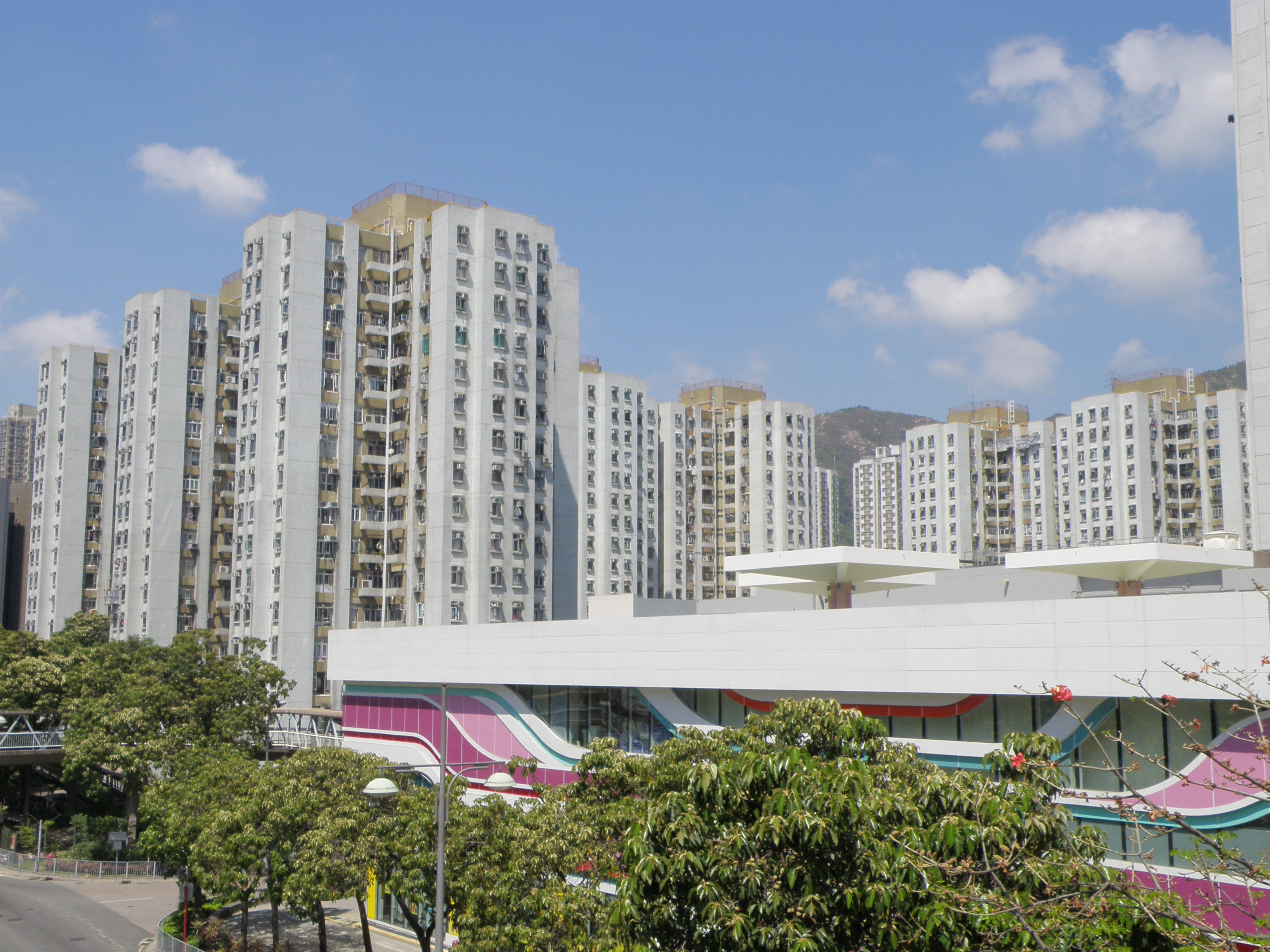
Siu On Court

Siu On Court (Chinese: 兆安苑) is a HOS court in Tuen Mun, located at the reclaimed land of Castle Peak Bay and near On Ting Estate. It consists of totally 10 blocks built in 1982.

Name	Type	Completion
Ting Lok House	Old-Cruciform	1982
Ting Yau House	Old-Cruciform	1982
Ting Hei House	Old-Cruciform	1982
Ting Pong House	Old-Cruciform	1982
Ting Man House	Old-Cruciform	1982
Ting Chi House	Old-Cruciform	1982
Ting Yin House	Old-Cruciform	1982
Ting On House	Old-Cruciform	1982
Ting Kay House	Old-Cruciform	1982
Ting Hoi House	Old-Cruciform	1982

=== Siu Pong Court ===
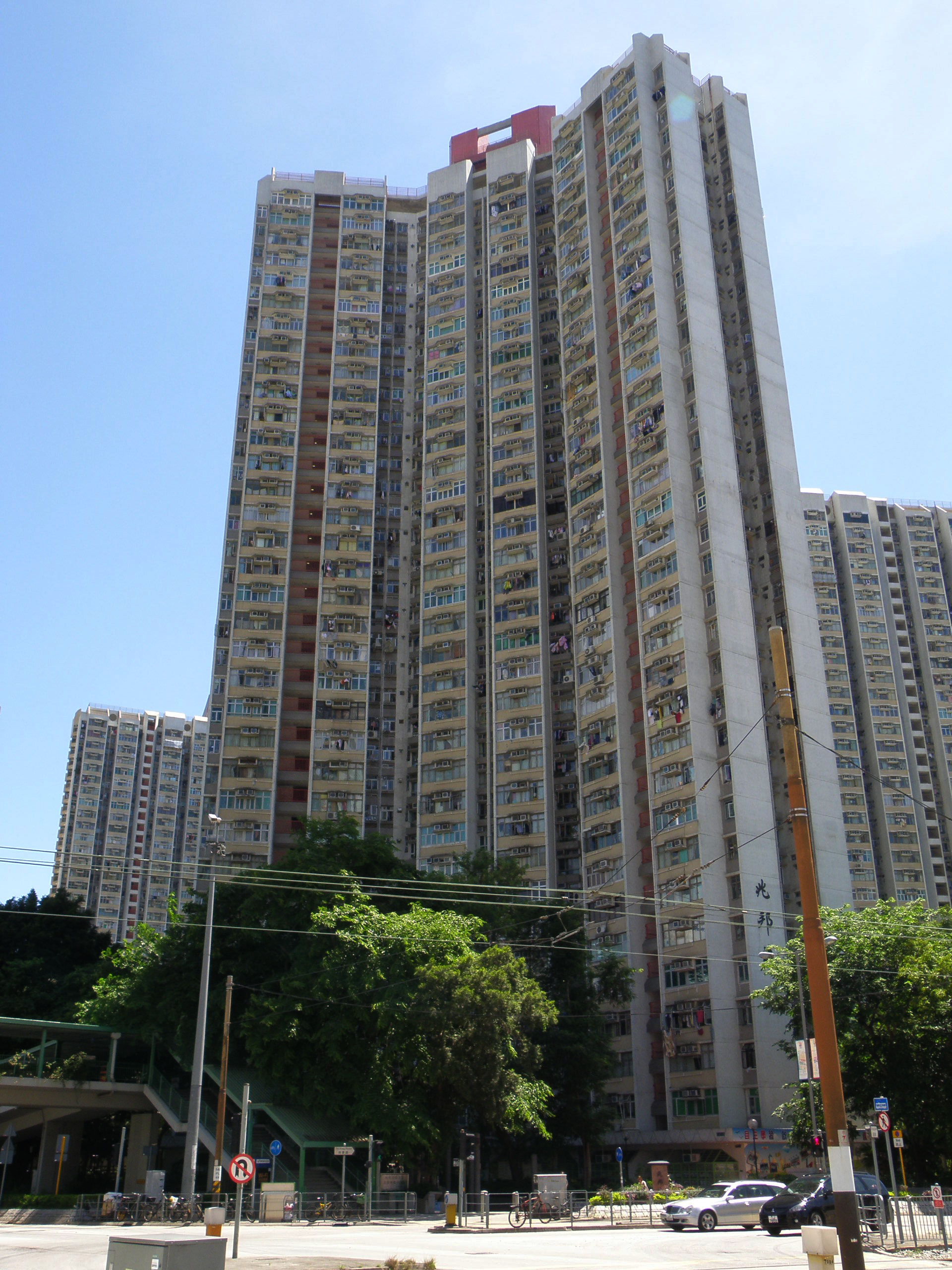
Siu Pong Court

Siu Pong Court (Chinese: 兆邦苑) is a Home Ownership Scheme court in Tuen Mun, near Tin King Estate. It consists of 1 block built in 1991.

Name	Type	Completion
Siu Pong Court	Trident 4	1991

=== Tai Hing Estate ===
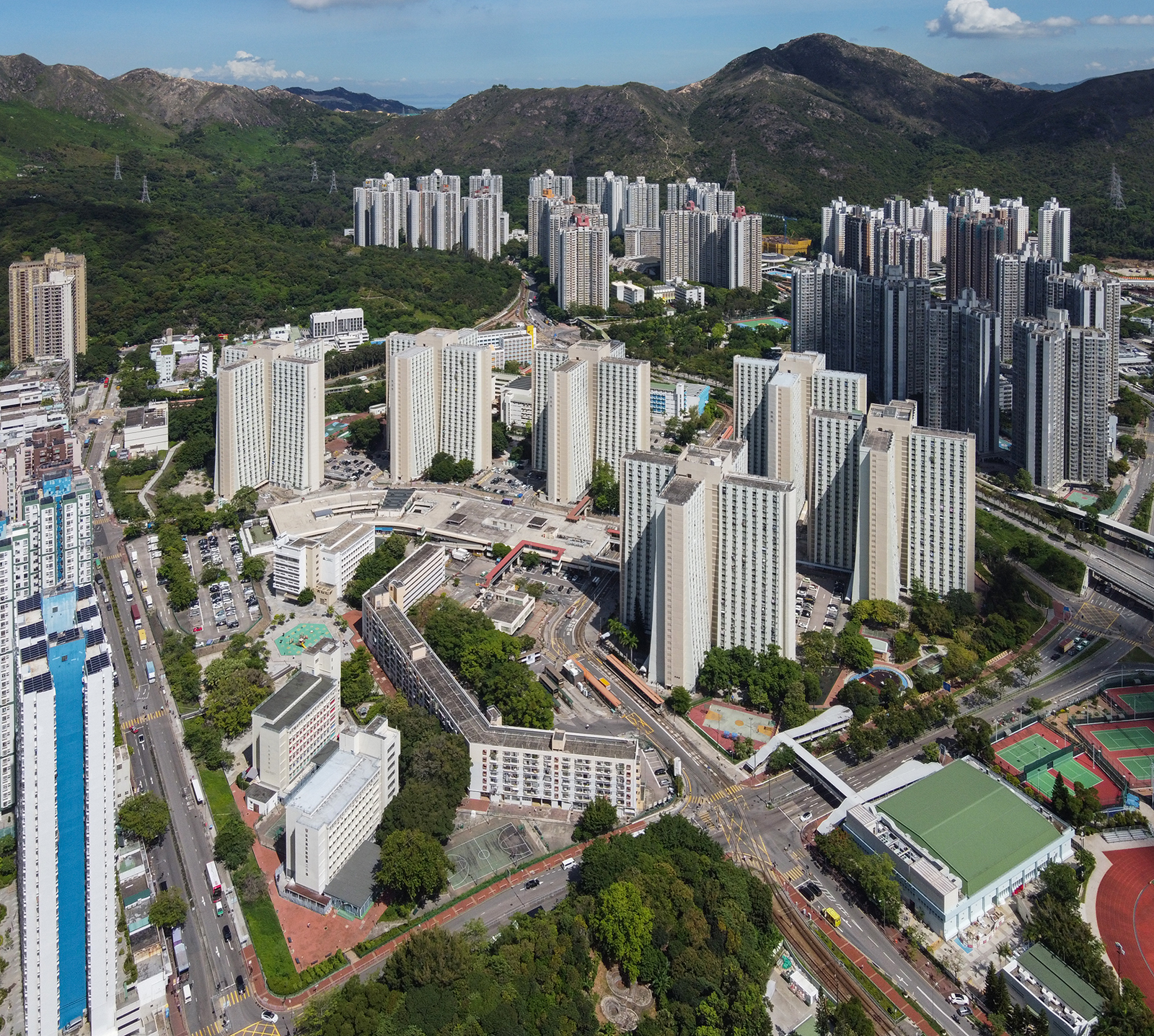
Tai Hing Estate

Tai Hing Estate (Chinese: 大興邨) is the oldest existing public housing estate in Tuen Mun, New Territories, Hong Kong. There are 8,602 flats in the estate with capacity to house 21,100 people. It is also a district council constituency. It is a traditional strong pro-democratic area, having returned Albert Ho as district councillor in the Legislative Council.

=== Terrace Concerto ===
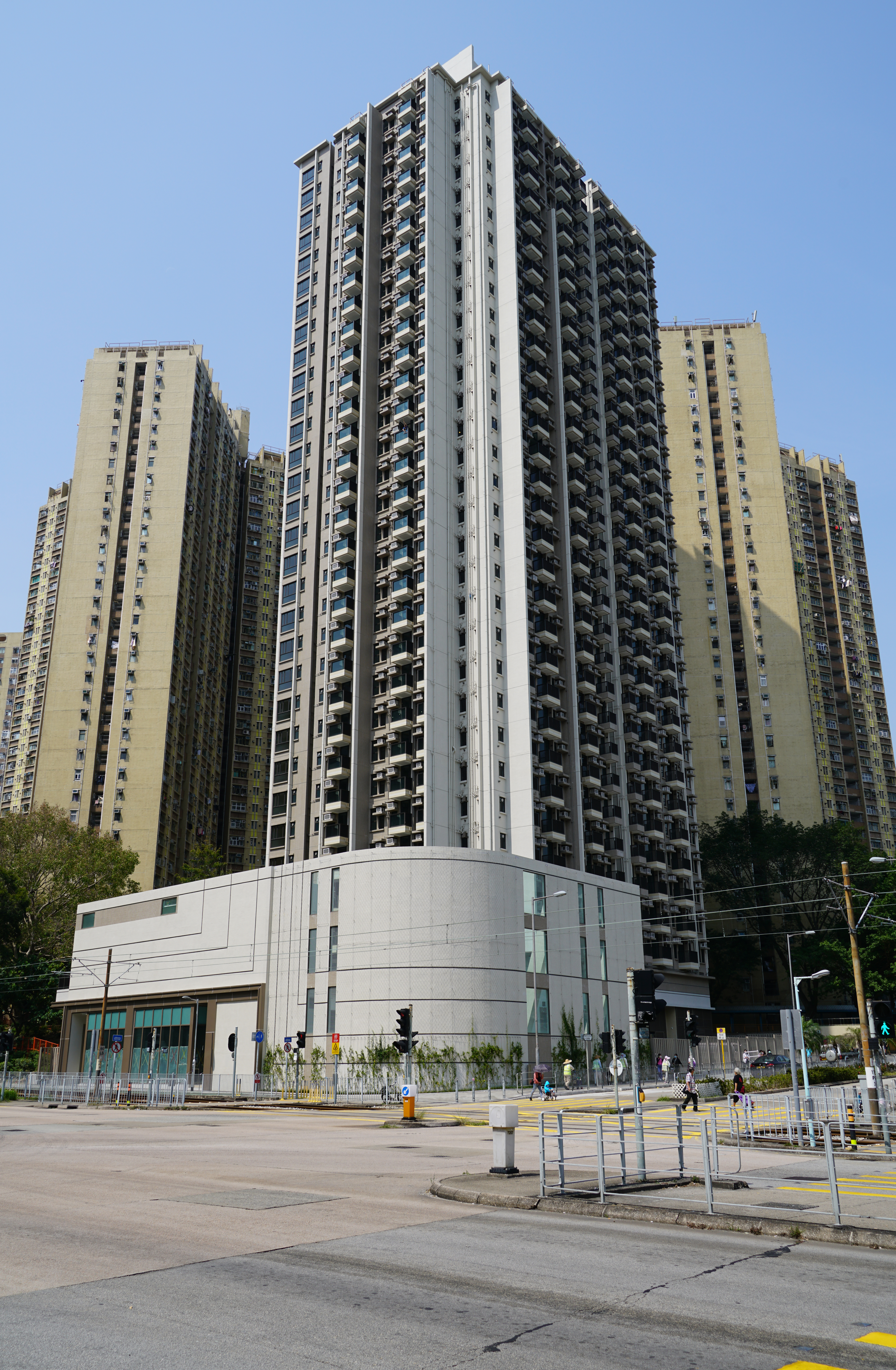
Terrace Concerto

Terrace Concerto (Chinese: 翠鳴臺) is a court under the Subsidized Sale Flats Project developed by Hong Kong Housing Society in Ming Kum Road, Tuen Mun. It comprises single 31-storey tower with total 290 units ranging from 297 to 662 square feet. It was the site of Yan Oi Tong Tin Ka Ping Secondary School Science And Ecological Learning Centre in Shan King Estate.

The court was sold together with another court, Mount Verdant in Tseung Kwan O, in 2017, at prices between HK$1.92 million and HK$4.78 million, or about 30 percent less than market prices. It is expected to complete in 2021.

Name	Type	Completion
Terrace Concerto	Designed by architect	2021

=== Tin King Estate ===
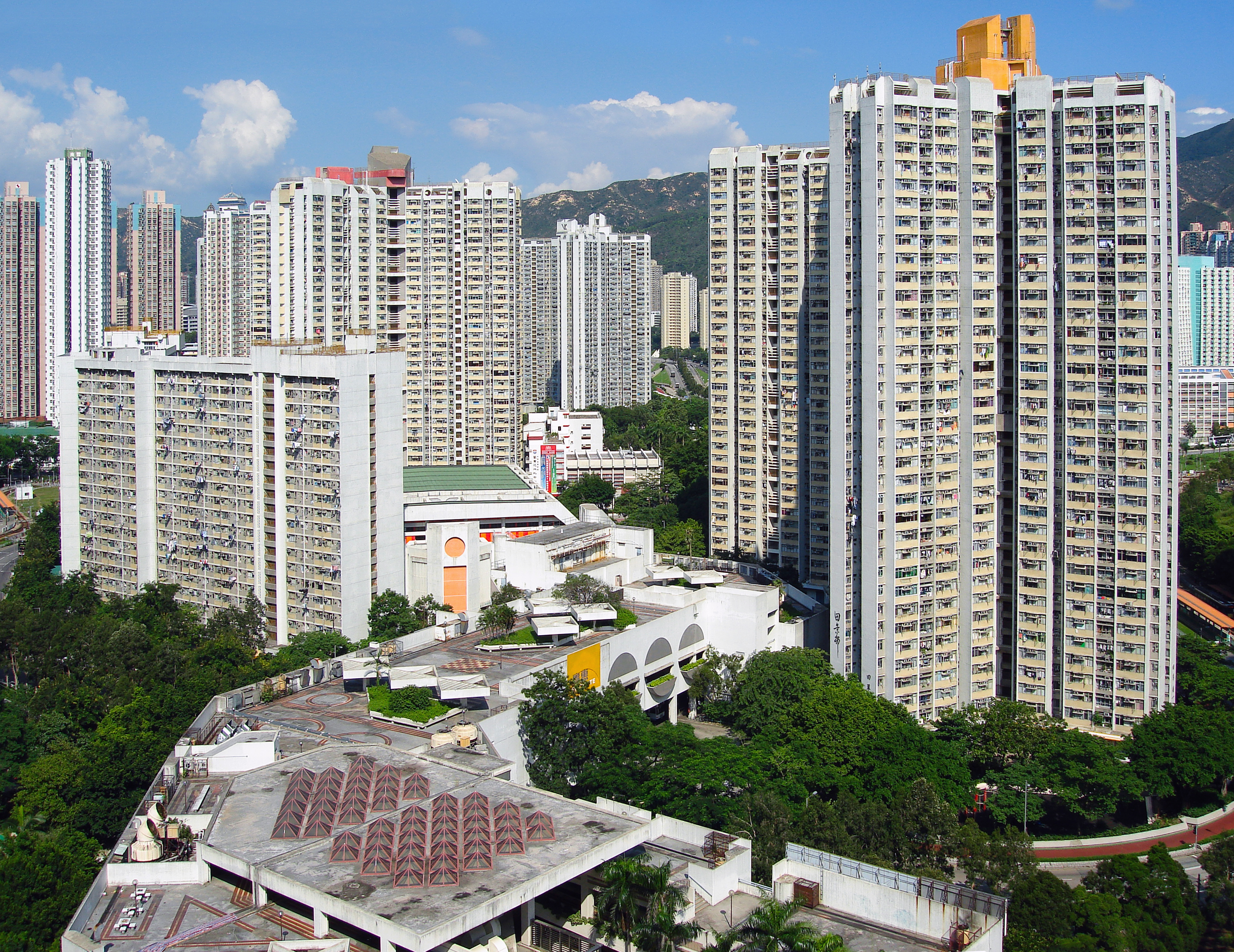
Tin King Estate

Tin King Estate (Chinese: 田景邨) is the tenth public housing estate in Tuen Mun. It consists of 4 residential buildings completed in 1989. The estate was formerly the site of Leung Tin Village and it was named from the village, together with the nearby Leung King Estate. In 1999, some of the flats in the estate were sold under Tenants Purchase Scheme Phase 2.

Name	Type	Completion
Tin Lok House	New Slab	1989
Tin Tun House	Trident 3	1989
Tin Yue House	Trident 3	1989
Tin Tsui House	Trident 4	1989

=== Tsui Ning Garden ===
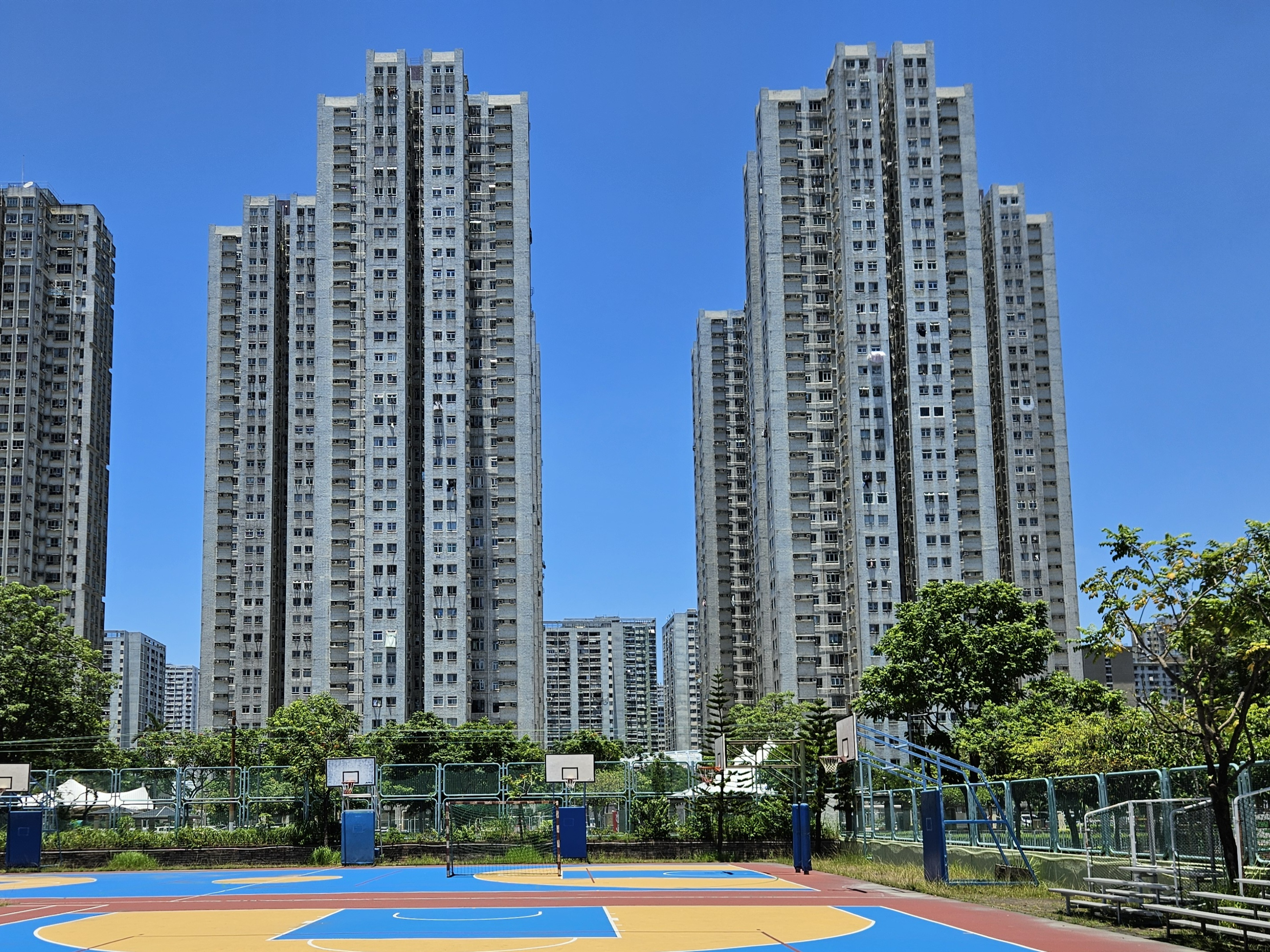
Tsui Ning Garden

Tsui Ning Garden (Chinese: 翠寧花園) is a Home Ownership Scheme and Private Sector Participation Scheme court in Tuen Mun, located at the reclaimed land of Castle Peak Bay, near Yau Oi Estate and On Ting Estate. It has totally 6 blocks built in 1991.

Name	Type	Completion
Block 1	Private Sector Participation Scheme	1991
Block 2	Private Sector Participation Scheme	1991
Block 3	Private Sector Participation Scheme	1991
Block 4	Private Sector Participation Scheme	1991
Block 5	Private Sector Participation Scheme	1991
Block 6	Private Sector Participation Scheme	1991

=== Wu King Estate ===
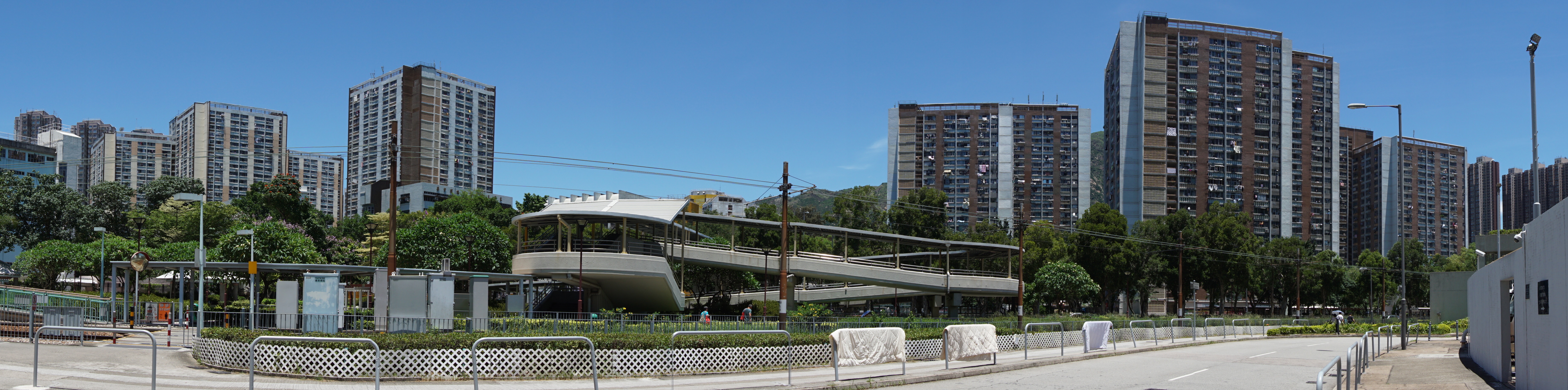
Wu King Estate

Wu King Estate (Chinese: 湖景邨) is the sixth public housing estate in Tuen Mun consisting of 6 residential blocks completed in 1982. It is built on the reclaimed land of Castle Peak Bay.

Wu King Estate is in Primary One Admission (POA) School Net 70. Within the school net are multiple aided schools (operated independently but funded with government money) and the following government schools: Tuen Mun Government Primary School (屯門官立小學).

Name	Type	Completion
Wu Boon House	Twin Tower	1982
Wu Fai House	Twin Tower	1982
Wu Kwong House	Twin Tower	1982
Wu Pik House	Twin Tower	1982
Wu Tsui House	Twin Tower	1982
Wu Yuet House	Twin Tower	1982

=== Yan Tin Estate ===
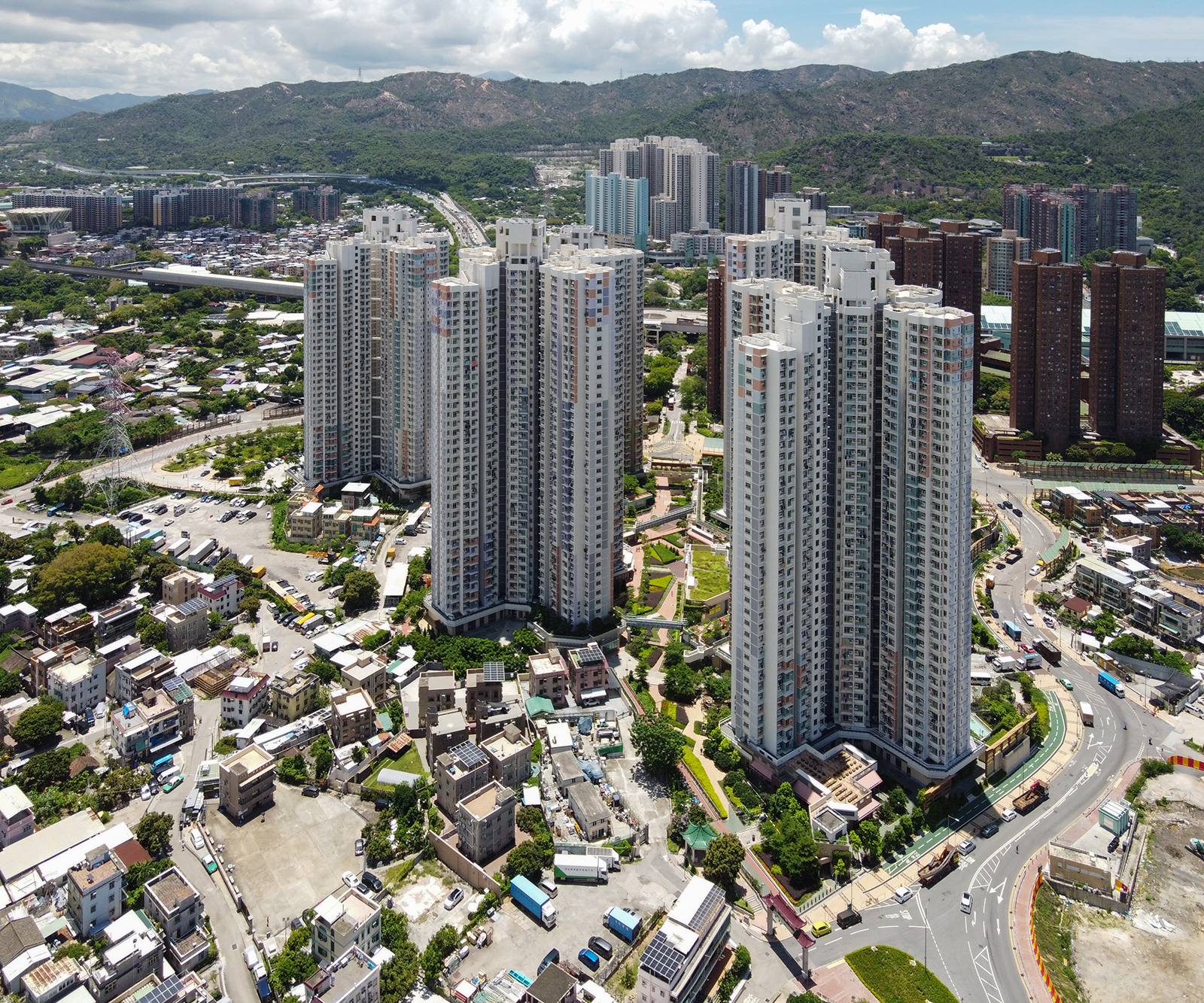
Fu Tai Estate

Yan Tin Estate (欣田邨) is a new public housing estate in Tuen Mun Area 54, behind Siu Hong Court. It consists of five residential blocks, ranging in height from 33 to 38 storeys, and the Yan Tin Shopping Centre. It provides 4,688 rental flats catering to an approximate population of around 13,000. Tenant intake began on 23 March 2018.

Name	Chinese name	Type	Completion
Chun Tin House	俊田樓	Non-standard	2018
Yat Tin House	逸田樓	Non-standard	2018
Hei Tin House	喜田樓	Non-standard	2018
Yuet Tin House	悅田樓	Non-standard	2018
Luk Tin House	綠田樓	Non-standard	2018

=== Yau Oi Estate ===
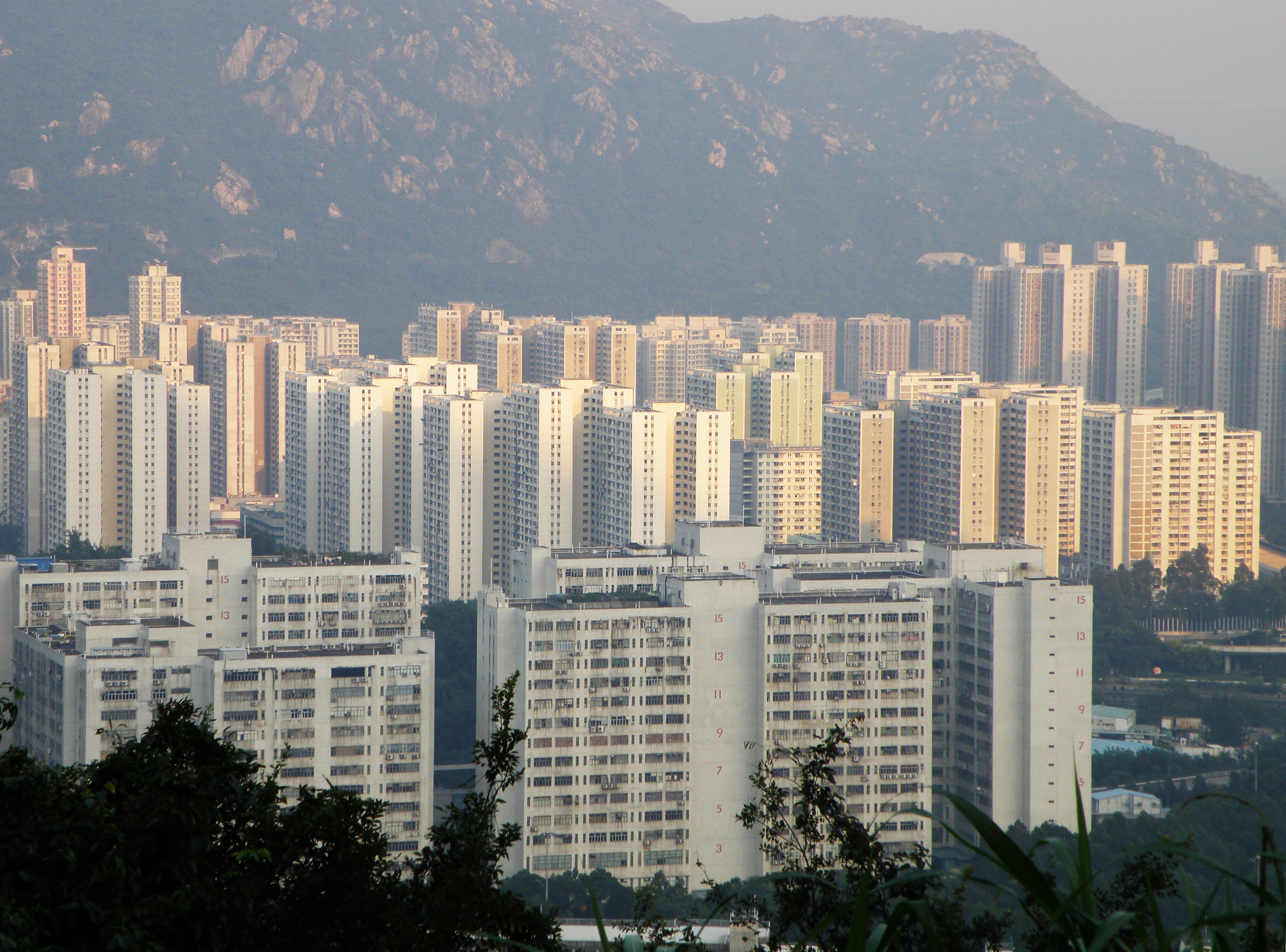
Yau Oi Estate

Yau Oi Estate (Chinese: 友愛邨) is the third public housing estate in Tuen Mun. It was built between 1979 and 1982 on reclaimed land of Castle Peak Bay. Consisting of 11 residential blocks, it was the largest single subsidized housing development in Hong Kong, with 9,153 units and a population of more than 35,000.

Name	Type	Completion
Oi Ming House	Double H	1979
Oi Lai House	Double H	1980
Oi Hei House	Double H	1980
Oi Tak House	Double H	1980
Oi Chi House	Double H	1981
Oi Shun House	Twin Tower	1981
Oi Yee House	Twin Tower	1981
Oi Lim House	Twin Tower	1982
Oi Yung House	Old Slab	1980
Oi Fai House	Triple H	1980
Oi Lok House	Old Slab	1981

=== Yuet Wu Villa ===
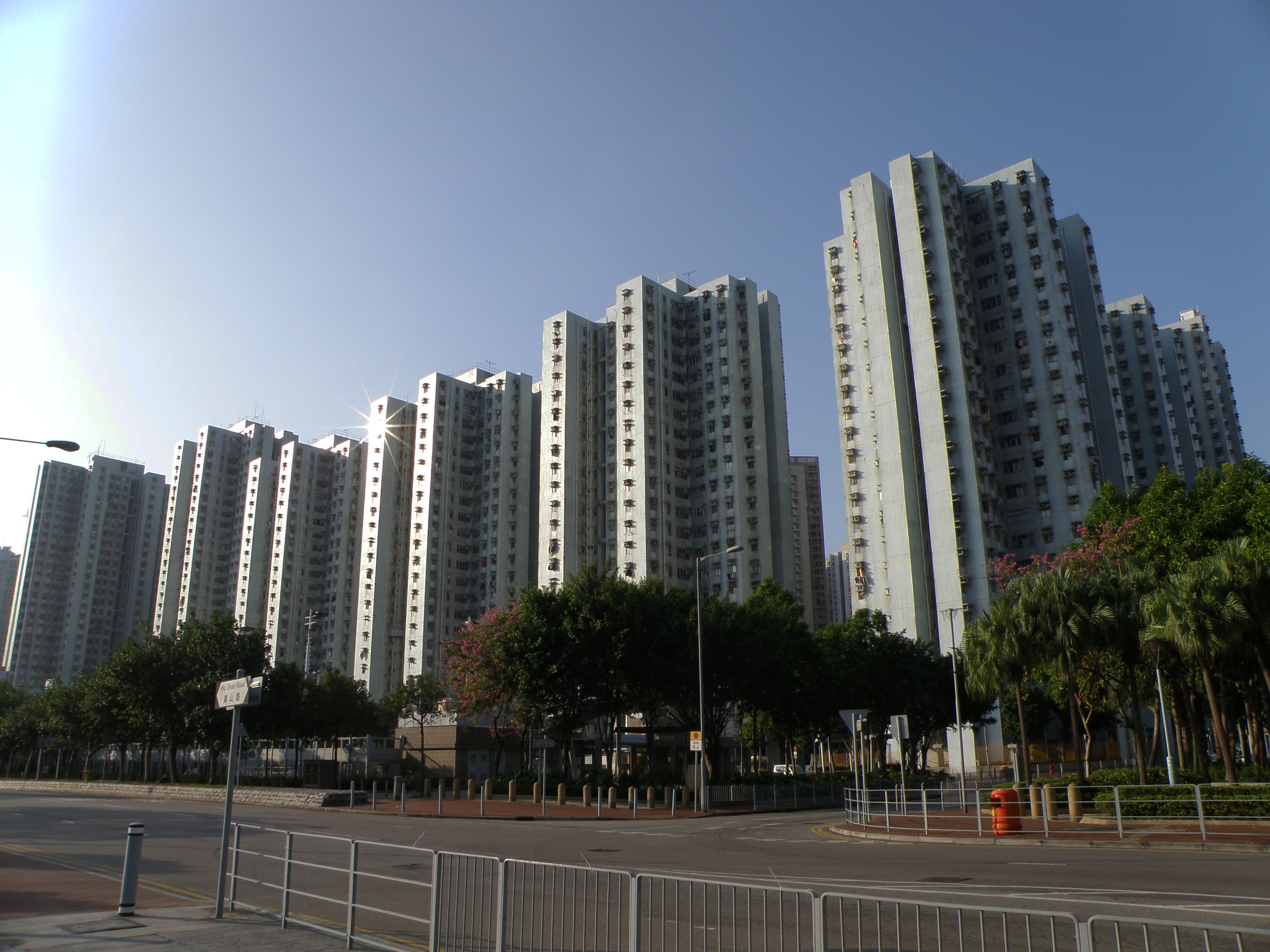
Yuet Wu Villa

Yuet Wu Villa (Chinese: 悅湖山莊) is a Home Ownership Scheme and Private Sector Participation Scheme court in Tuen Mun, located at the reclaimed land of Castle Peak Bay. It comprises 15 high-rise tower blocks consisting of 3,890 residential units, which were built in 1994.

Name	Type	Completion
Block 1	Private Sector Participation Scheme	1994
Block 2	Private Sector Participation Scheme	1994
Block 3	Private Sector Participation Scheme	1994
Block 4	Private Sector Participation Scheme	1994
Block 5	Private Sector Participation Scheme	1994
Block 6	Private Sector Participation Scheme	1994
Block 7	Private Sector Participation Scheme	1994
Block 8	Private Sector Participation Scheme	1994
Block 9	Private Sector Participation Scheme	1994
Block 10	Private Sector Participation Scheme	1994
Block 11	Private Sector Participation Scheme	1994
Block 12	Private Sector Participation Scheme	1994
Block 13	Private Sector Participation Scheme	1994
Block 14	Private Sector Participation Scheme	1994
Block 15	Private Sector Participation Scheme	1994
