= Hoh Fuk Tong stop =

Coordinates: 22°23′51″N 113°58′40″E

Hoh Fuk Tong 何福堂
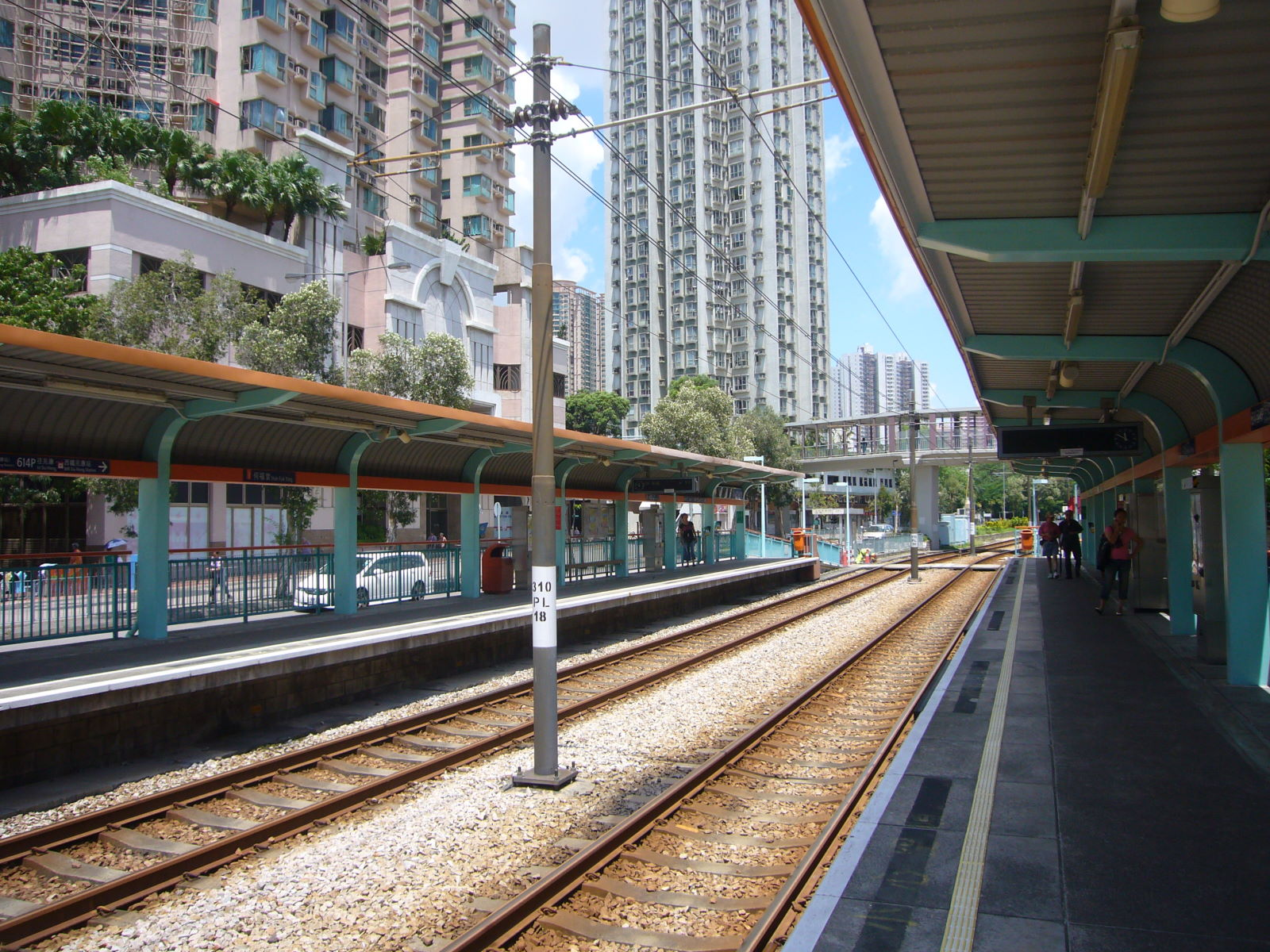
- Hoh Fuk Tong stop platform

Chinese name
- Chinese: 何福堂
Transcriptions
Standard Mandarin
- Hanyu Pinyin: Héfútáng
Yue: Cantonese
- Jyutping: ho4 fuk1 tong4

General information
- Location: San Hui; Tuen Mun District; Hong Kong
- System: MTR Light Rail stop
- Owner: KCR Corporation
- Operator: MTR Corporation
- Line: 614 614P
- Platforms: 2 side platforms
- Tracks: 2
- Connections: Bus, minibus

Construction
- Structure type: At-grade
- Accessible: yes

Other information
- Station code: HFT (English code); 310 (Digital code)
- Fare zone: 2

History
- Opened: 2 February 1992; 34 years ago

Services
Preceding stop	MTR Light Rail	Following stop
Pui To towards Tuen Mun Ferry Pier	614	San Hui towards Yuen Long
Pui To towards Tuen Mun Ferry Pier	614P	San Hui towards Siu Hong
Location
- Location within MTR

Hoh Fuk Tong (Chinese: 何福堂) is a stop on the MTR Light Rail network in Tuen Mun District, New Territories, Hong Kong. It is located at ground level at Castle Peak Road - San Hui next to CCC Hoh Fuk Tong College and Hoh Fuk Tong Centre.

Being part of Fare Zone 2 for single ride tickets, the stop serves CCC Hoh Fuk Tong College's vicinity and the southeastern part of San Hui.

== History ==
Hoh Fuk Tong Stop commenced operation on 2 February 1992 along with the Tuen Mun Northeast Extension of Light Rail Transit.

The stop is named after Hoh Fuk Tong Centre and CCC Hoh Fuk Tong College, which are in turn named after Revd. Hoh Fuk Tong, the first ever Christian pastor of Chinese ethnicity in Hong Kong.

Hoh Fuk Tong Stop is the only Light Rail stop in Hong Kong named after an individual.

== Rail service ==
Hoh Fuk Tong Stop is served by Light Rail route 614 and its short-working service 614P.

== See also ==
- Hoh Fuk Tong Centre
