= Prime View stop =

MTR Light Rail stop in Hong Kong

Coordinates: 22°24′14″N 113°58′47″E

Prime View 景峰
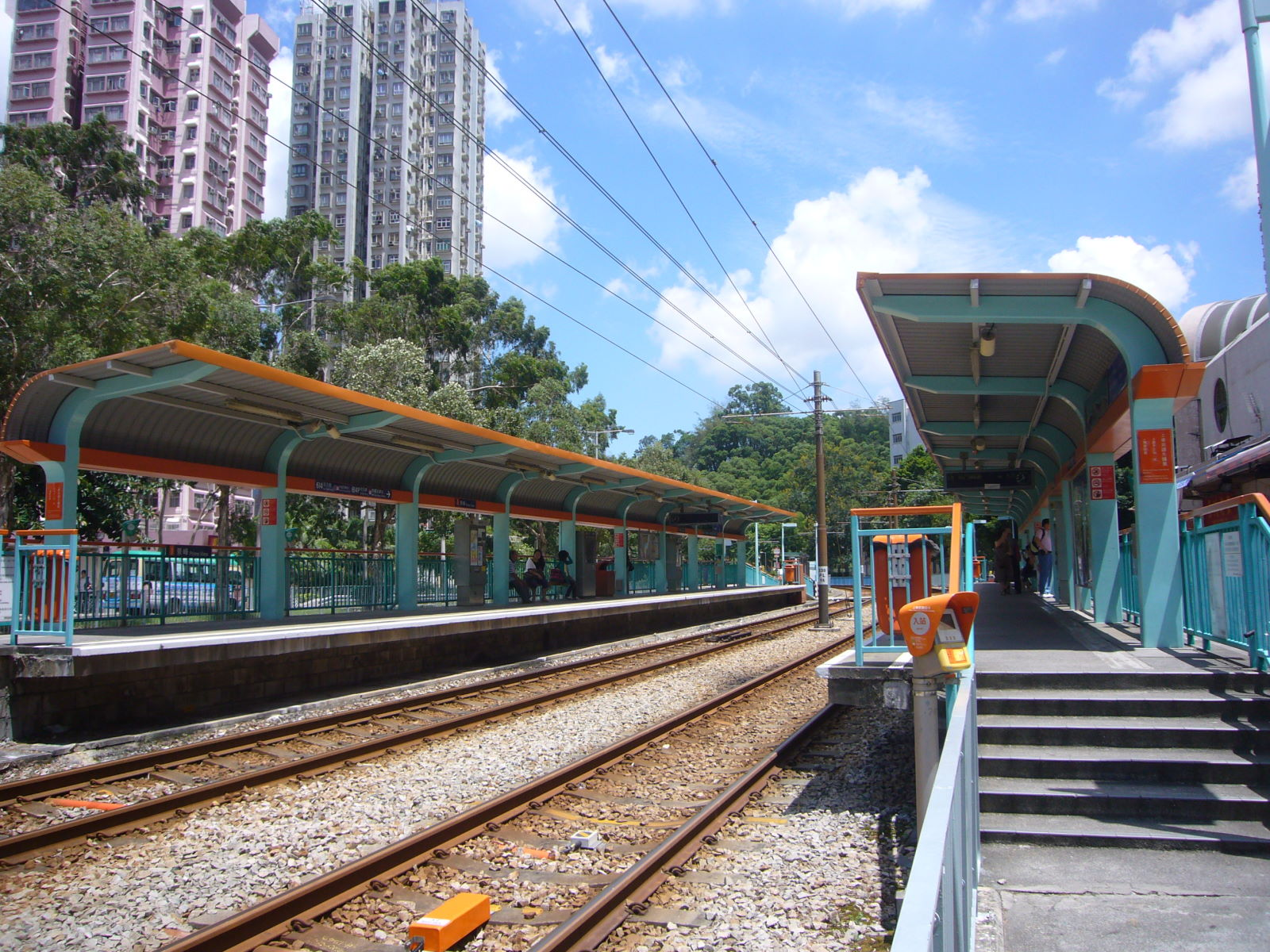
- Appearance of Prime View stop

General information
- Location: Prime View Garden; Tuen Mun District; Hong Kong
- System: MTR Light Rail stop
- Owner: KCR Corporation
- Operator: MTR Corporation
- Line: 614 614P
- Platforms: 2 side platforms
- Tracks: 2
- Connections: Bus, minibus

Construction
- Structure type: At-grade
- Accessible: yes

Other information
- Station code: PRV (English code); 330 (Digital code)
- Fare zone: 2

History
- Opened: 2 February 1992; 34 years ago

Services
Preceding stop	MTR Light Rail	Following stop
San Hui towards Tuen Mun Ferry Pier	614	Fung Tei towards Yuen Long
San Hui towards Tuen Mun Ferry Pier	614P	Fung Tei towards Siu Hong
Location
- Location within MTR

Prime View (Chinese: 景峰) is one of the MTR Light Rail stops in Hong Kong. It is located at ground level at Castle Peak Road next to Prime View Garden in Tuen Mun District. It began service on 2 February 1992 and belongs to Zone 2. It serves Prime View Garden and nearby areas.
