= Butterfly Beach =

Butterfly Beach may refer to:

- Butterfly Beach, a beach in Montecito, California, United States
- Butterfly Beach, a beach in Tuen Mun District, the New Territories, Hong Kong
- Butterfly Beach, a beach in Goa, India
