= San Hui stop =

MTR Light Rail stop in Tuen Mun District

Coordinates: 22°24′01″N 113°58′40″E

San Hui 新墟
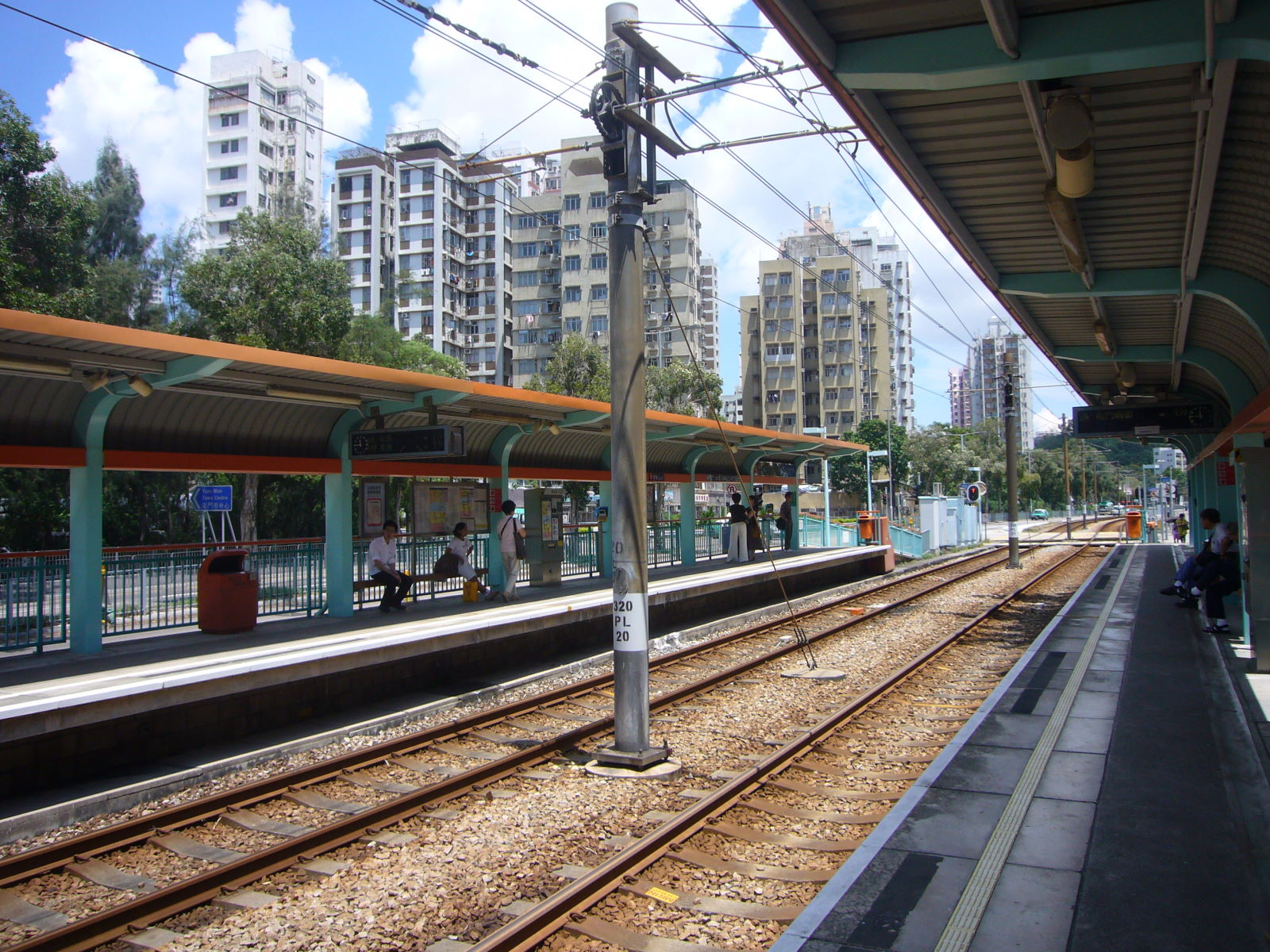
- San Hui stop platform

General information
- Location: San Hui Village; Tuen Mun District; Hong Kong
- System: MTR Light Rail stop
- Owner: KCR Corporation
- Operator: MTR Corporation
- Line: 614 614P
- Platforms: 2 side platforms
- Tracks: 2
- Connections: Bus, minibus

Construction
- Structure type: At-grade
- Accessible: yes

Other information
- Station code: SAH (English code); 320 (Digital code)
- Fare zone: 2

History
- Opened: 2 February 1992; 34 years ago

Services
Preceding stop	MTR Light Rail	Following stop
Hoh Fuk Tong towards Tuen Mun Ferry Pier	614	Prime View towards Yuen Long
Hoh Fuk Tong towards Tuen Mun Ferry Pier	614P	Prime View towards Siu Hong
Location
- Location within MTR

San Hui (Chinese: 新墟) is one of the MTR Light Rail stops. It is located at ground level at Castle Peak Road next to San Hui Village in Tuen Mun District. It began service on 2 February 1992 and belongs to Zone 2. It serves San Hui Village and Kau Hui San Village.

== See also ==
- San Hui
