= Fung Tei stop =

MTR Light Rail stop in Hong Kong

Coordinates: 22°24′29″N 113°58′44″E

Fung Tei 鳳地
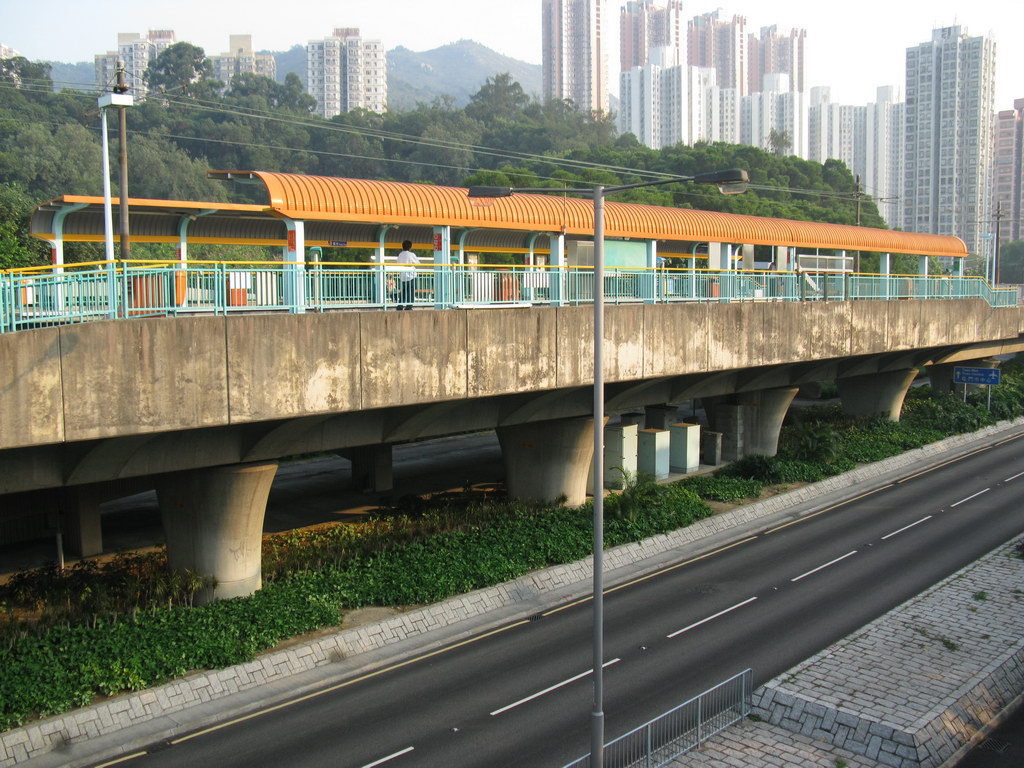
- Fung Tei stop's Platform

General information
- Location: Fung Tei; Tuen Mun District; Hong Kong
- System: MTR Light Rail stop
- Owner: KCR Corporation
- Operator: MTR Corporation
- Line: 614 614P
- Platforms: 2 side platforms
- Tracks: 2
- Connections: Bus, minibus

Construction
- Structure type: Elevated
- Accessible: yes

Other information
- Station code: FUT (English code); 340 (Digital code)
- Fare zone: 3

History
- Opened: 2 February 1992; 34 years ago

Services
Preceding stop	MTR Light Rail	Following stop
Prime View towards Tuen Mun Ferry Pier	614	Siu Hong towards Yuen Long
Prime View towards Tuen Mun Ferry Pier	614P	Siu Hong Terminus
Location
- Location within MTR

Fung Tei (Chinese: 鳳地) is an MTR Light Rail stop elevated at Castle Peak Road in Tuen Mun District, near Brilliant Garden. It began service on 2 February 1992 and belongs to Zone 3. It serves Fung Tei and nearby areas.
