= Tuen Mun New Town =

Satellite town in New Territories, Hong Kong

Tuen Mun New Town 屯門新市鎮
- Neighbourhood
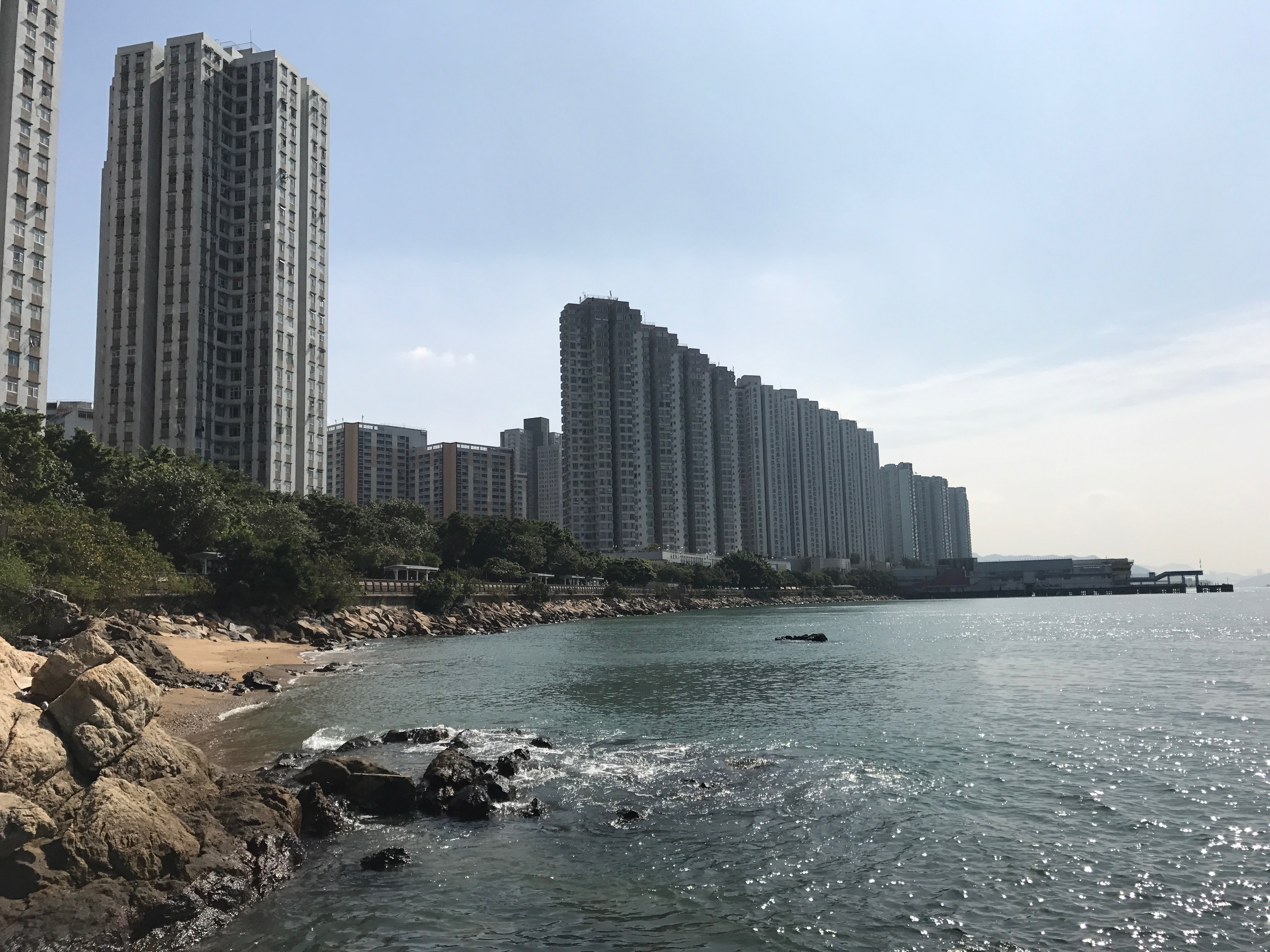
- Residential blocks at the Butterfly Bay, Tuen Mun New Town
- Etymology: Tuen Mun
- Nicknames: Tuen Mun Town, Castle Peak New Town
- Tuen Mun New Town in Hong Kong
- Coordinates: 22.39163°N 113.9770885°E
- Country: China
- SAR: Hong Kong
- Region: New Territories
- District: Tuen Mun
- Founded: 1966; 60 years ago

Area
  - Total: 22.6 km^{2} (8.7 sq mi)
- Time zone: UTC+8 (Hong Kong Time)
- source for area size

Tuen Mun New Town
- Traditional Chinese: 屯門新市鎮
- Cantonese Yale: Tyùhn mùhn sān shíh dzan
Transcriptions
Yue: Cantonese
- Yale Romanization: Tyùhn mùhn sān shíh dzan
- Jyutping: Tyun4 mun4 san1 si5 zan3

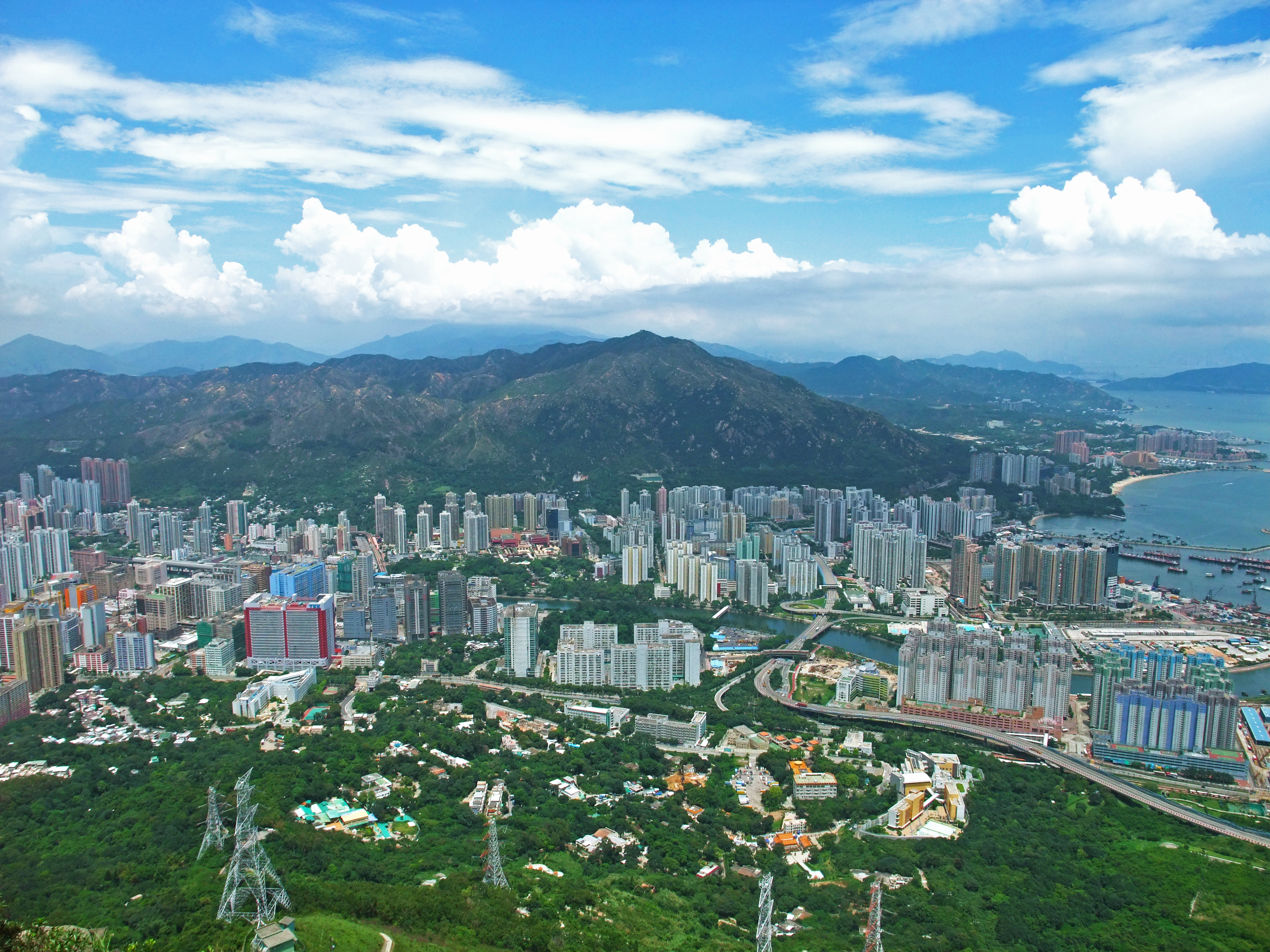
View of Tuen Mun New Town and Kau Keng Shan from Castle Peak

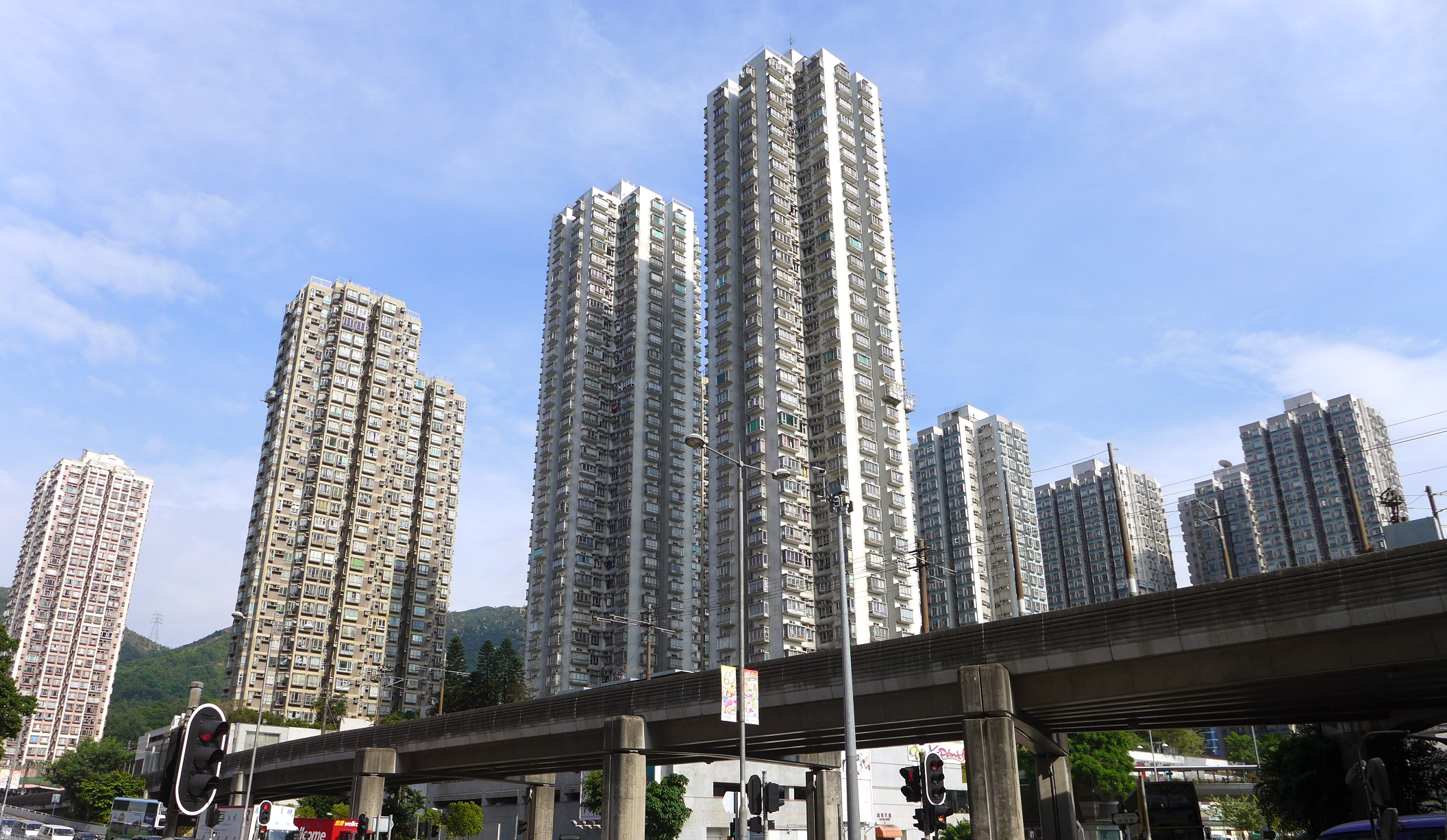
Tuen Mun Town centre

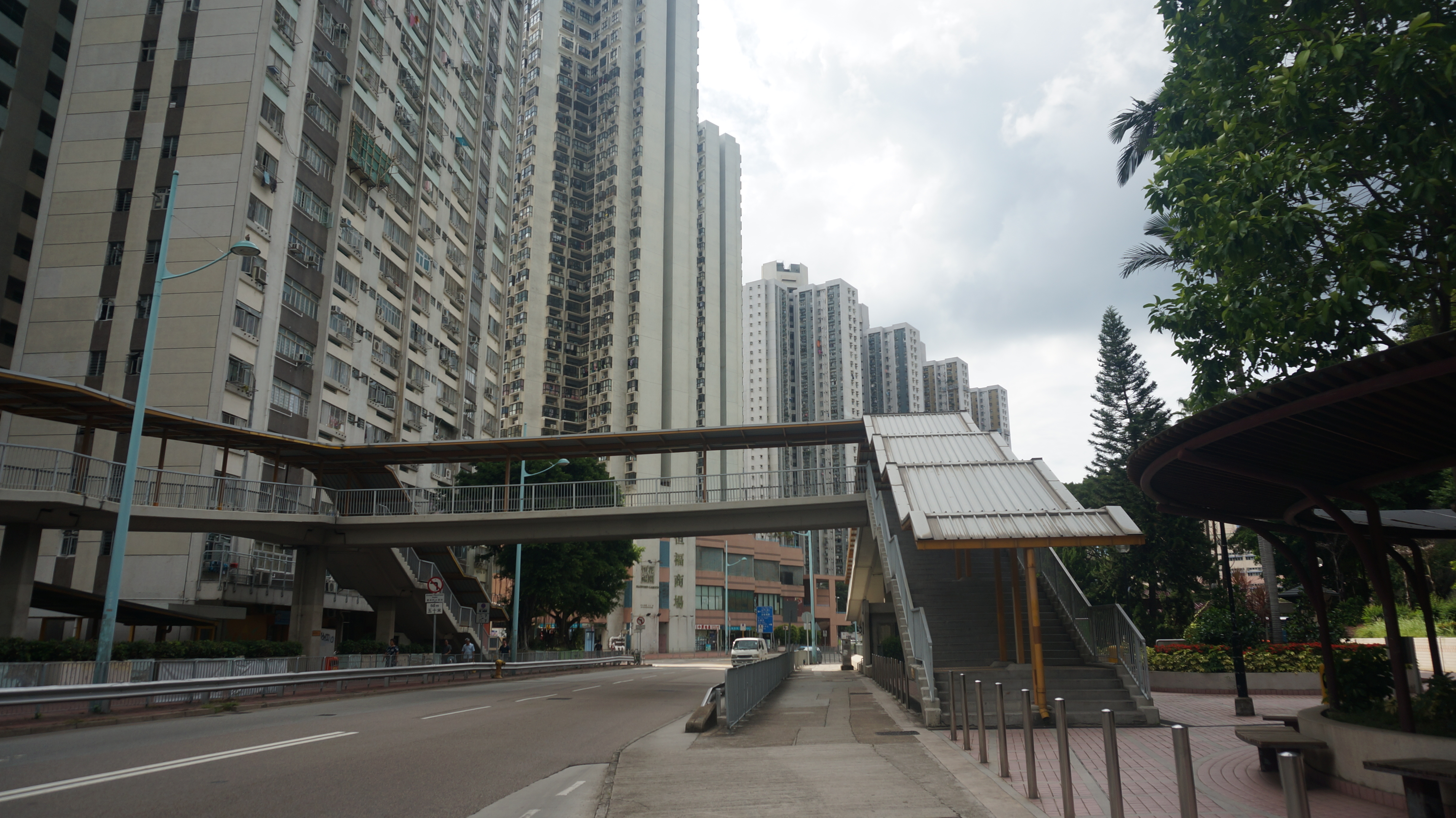
Residence in Sam Shing area

Tuen Mun New Town (formerly Castle Peak New Town), commonly referred to simply as Tuen Mun, is a satellite town of Hong Kong. It is one of the new towns that were developed by the Hong Kong Government in the New Territories from the 1960s. It was built around the existing rural local centre of Tuen Mun (a.k.a. Castle Peak), which has since been referred to as the Tuen Mun Kau Hui‌ and the Tuen Mun San Hui. The new town covers most of the urban area of Tuen Mun District.

The model of development is quite similar to Sha Tin New Town, with town centre built in the middle. While the southern parts of the town is similar to Tai Po New Town.

== History ==
The initial plan for Tuen Mun New Town can be traced to a report by consulting firm Scott Wilson Kirkpatrick & Partners in 1959. At that time the project was known as Castle Peak. The history of settlement in Tuen Mun can be traced back 6,000 years. The area was part of a larger region which was leased from the Qing Empire to the British Empire in 1898 for 99 years as part of the Convention for the Extension of Hong Kong Territory. The colonial government, faced with overcrowding resulting from large numbers of immigrants from China as well as natural increase, embarked on various new towns projects to create large housing developments to house the rapidly growing population.

Construction of the new town started in 1966. In the next year, the government reclaiming 29 acres (12 ha) of land near an area known as "Tuen Mun San Hui" (Chinese: 屯門新墟; Jyutping: Tyun4 Mun4 San1 Heoi1; Cantonese Yale: Tyùhn Mùhn Sān Hēui; lit. 'Tuen Mun new market'). San Hui was considered as a market township of the area at that time, which was a market centre for the surrounding area. Further reclamation was carried out in Castle Peak Bay, among others, until the late 1960s. The government also levelled the hillside area to obtain land for the town during that period. J. M. Wigglesworth, a senior planning officer of the government, has stated that choosing coastal sites is partially due to land tenure rights in the New Territories. Thus the government preferred land reclamation.

In 1973, the new town project was renamed Tuen Mun New Town. Rumour has it that the town was renamed because Castle Peak was more famous for a psychiatric hospital which was named after the area.

The major construction works, such as land reclamation, underground drainage, electricity infrastructure, and roads were completed in 1974. However, the last sale of the land lease of the new town by the government wasn't carried out until 2019.

The first public housing estate of the new town was San Fat Estate. It was completed in 1971.

== Geography ==
Tuen Mun New Town, as of 1971, was 20 miles (32 km) by road and 15 miles (24 km) by sea from Kowloon. There was little chance of flood at that time. The new town is situation in the valley between Castle Peak and Tai Lam hill [sic] (should be Kau Keng Shan). Before the development, it was a major fishing port with a land-based population of 22,500 people. Studies suggested that the area should be developed into a satellite city of 1 million population. As of 2011 census, whole Tuen Mun District, which covers Tuen Mun New Town and other urban and rural areas, had a population of 487,546 people.

== Design ==
The development model is constructed around a town centre. The town is also served by multiple lines of the Light Rail.

According to the early draft of the new town, the settlement was designed to have land allocated for industrial use, which would provide employment to residents, however this did not eventuate. As Hong Kong transformed into a service-oriented economy, only 30% of residents in the western New Territories (including the Tuen Mun, Yuen Long, and Tin Shui Wai New Towns) worked locally, according to 2011 census. In 2019, some industrial buildings of the new town applied to be rezoned for commercial use. However, it was also reported that due to the opening of the Hong Kong–Zhuhai–Macau Bridge, some industrial buildings were rented by logistic companies in 2018. A number of logistics companies also expressed interest in land leases near the River Trade Terminal in 2018.

The road infrastructure of the town to other areas of Hong Kong relies on Tuen Mun Road and Castle Peak Road, as well as roads to northern Yuen Long District. Until the opening of the West Rail in 2003, local residents suffered from traffic congestion on Tuen Mun Road and Castle Peak Road. However, as of 2019, the railway line also reached its capacity and the government had planned new road to connect the town to the CBD via the site of the Lantau Tomorrow Vision project. Tuen Mun–Chek Lap Kok Link was opened in 2020.

Tuen Mun Ferry Pier serves as the pier for the town to connect to Mainland China, and Macau, as well as local destinations such as Lantau Island. In the past it also had scheduled ferries to Hong Kong Island.

The boundary and land uses of the town are still regulated by Tuen Mun Outline Zoning Plan. The government still periodically updates the plan. The first plan was approved by Governor-in-Council in 1967. As of 2018, the statutory boundaries of the town are "the ridges of Castle Peak to the west, Lam Tei Interchange of Castle Peak Road to the north, and Tai Lam Country Park to the east. To the southeast the area extends to Siu Lam Interchange of Tuen Mun Road, while to the southwest it extends to Tap Shek Kok." In 2017, the local council rejected the government's plan to convert some land from "government, institution and community" use or "open space" to residential.

=== Tuen Mun town centre ===
The town centre was designed to have public library, education centre, theatre, convention and exhibition hall, arts museum, as well as government building that connects to commercial buildings, which house supermarkets, banks and other shops that provide daily needs. In a history book edited by Lau Chi-pang (Chinese: 劉智鵬; Jyutping: Lau4 Zi3 Paang4) and Liu Shuyong (Chinese: 劉蜀永; pinyin: Liú Shǔyǒng; Jyutping: Lau4 Suk6 Wing5), they give a positive review on the town planning, which they describe the Tuen Mun town centre is the "centre of gravity" (Chinese: 重心) of the town:

今天看來，當初的規劃的確陸續得以實現，市中心確實是屯門的重心。

— 黃君健 [Kenneth Wong Kwan-kin], 屯門新市鎮的發展, 香港地區史研究之四：屯門 (2012)

In 1971, the section of the town that encompassing the existing market town San Hui was considered as the most-valuable land for high-rise private residential use. These residential area are designated as Tuen Mun Area 10, 11 and 13 in the OZP, which they are bordering one to another. Area 11 also accommodated the planned town centre. [sic] Tuen Mun Area 34, due west to Area 11 and 13, was designed to be an open space. Area 34 is now known as Tuen Mun Park. News reports also consider residential blocks of the Trend Plaza, Kam Wah Garden, Tuen Mun Town Plaza and Waldorf Garden are the four major residential estates of the town centre. In urban zoning, they were located at the aforementioned Area 11, as well as on a small strip of Area 37 of the Tuen Mun OZP. Another private residential estate, Tuen Mun Centre (Chinese: 屯門中心大廈), is situated at Area 10, which also marked as the site of the San Hui. Another land lease, Tuen Mun Town Lot №513, which was sold by the government in 2014, was also considered as next to the town centre and the railway station by the real estate critics.

Nowadays, near to the Tuen Mun railway station, are Tuen Mun Town Hall, Tuen Mun Public Library, Tuen Mun Clinic, Tuen Mun Government Offices, Tuen Mun Law Courts, Tuen Mun Park, as well as shopping centres such as V City, The Trend Plaza Shopping Arcade, Tuen Mun Town Plaza shopping centre, as well as pentahotel Tuen Mun, etc. Those public facilities were mostly located in Area 11 as well as Area 37, while the V City and its associated residential blocks, are located in Area 10. The railway station itself is located above the river, which divides Area 10 to Area 9.

== Politics ==
Some constituencies of the Tuen Mun District Council serve the new town, although the boundaries of the constituencies differ from the boundaries of the urban planning OZP. The executive branch of the district-level government, the Tuen Mun District Office of the Home Affairs Department, is located on the second floor of Tuen Mun Government Offices, a building located within the new town at 1 Tuen Hi Road.

== See also ==
- Hong Kong Gold Coast, a private housing estate built on the shores of the Castle Peak Bay
- Castle Peak Power Station, an electric power station that located within the town boundaries
- Hung Shui Kiu, a new town which is located partially in Tuen Mun District
