= Hoh Fuk Tong Centre =

Declared monument of Hong Kong

- Chinese: 何福堂會所 - 福堂樓
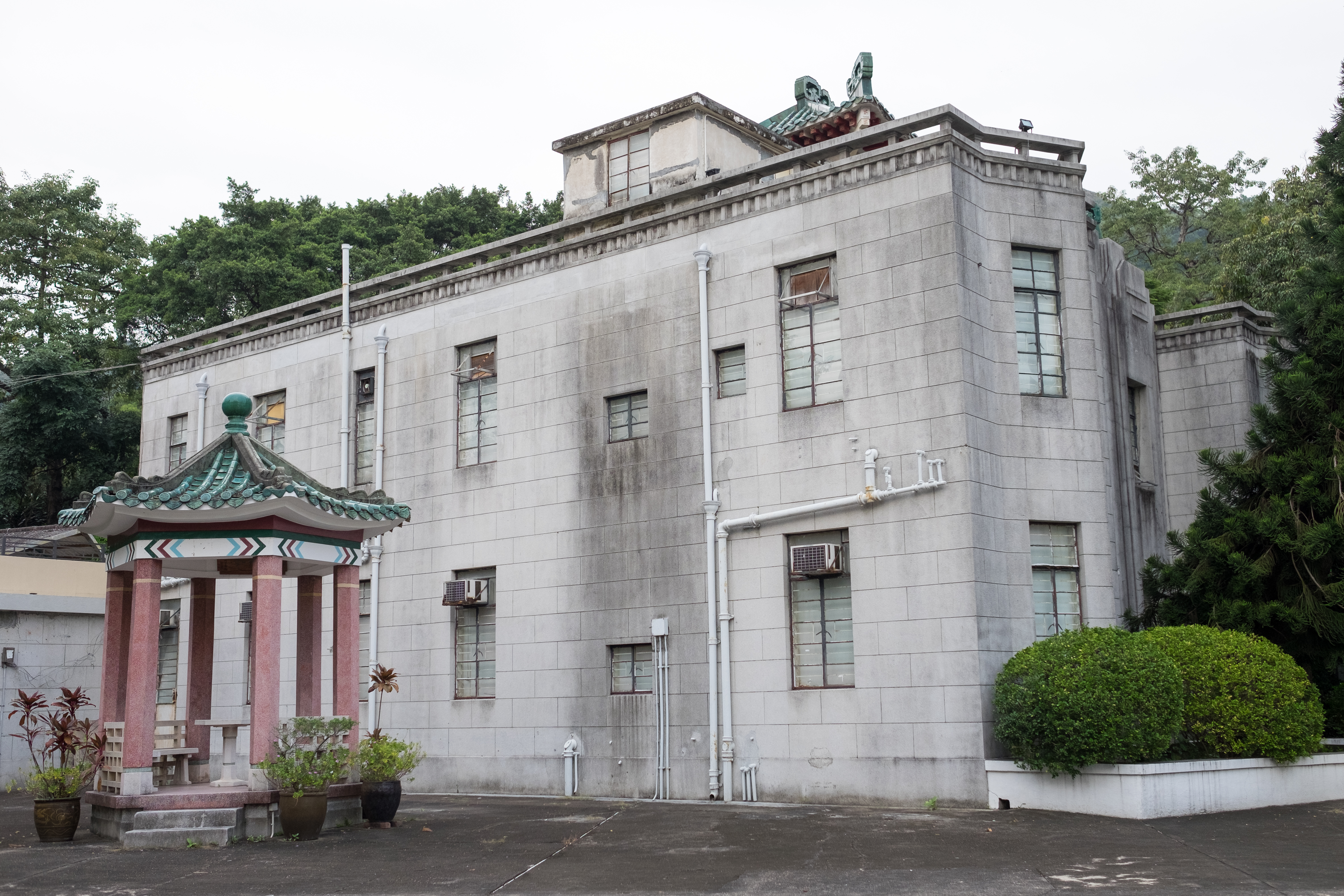
- The Morrison Building, Hoh Fuk Tong Centre
- Interactive map of the Hoh Fuk Tong Centre area

General information
- Location: 28 Castle Peak Road - San Hui, San Hui, Tuen Mun, New Territories, Hong Kong
- Coordinates: 22.39787°N 113.97737°E
- Construction started: 1930s

Hoh Fuk Tong Centre (Chinese: 何福堂會所 - 福堂樓) is located at 28 Castle Peak Road - San Hui, San Hui, Tuen Mun, New Territories, Hong Kong near Light Rail Hoh Fuk Tong stop. Morrison Building is a declared monument of Hong Kong.

The centre was named after Rev. Hoh Fuk Tong, the first Chinese pastor in Hong Kong.

== History ==
Hoh Fuk Tong Centre was originally built by General Cai Tingkai (1892–1968) as his personal villa. The general led the Nineteenth Corps against the Japanese invasion between 1936 and the early 1940s.

The villa was then used for tertiary education by the Ta Teh Institute, founded under the directive of Chinese leaders Zhou Enlai and Dong Biwu, from 1946 to 1949. After the closure of Ta Teh Institute, the London Missionary Society, now the Council for World Mission, bought the campus and lent it to the Church of Christ in China since 1950.

The London Missionary Society formally transferred the ownership of the compound to the Church at a token fee of one dollar in 1961.

In early 2000s, the owner of the building, Hong Kong Council of the Church of Christ in China, applied to the Buildings Department to demolish all the centre's historical buildings and redevelop the site. "But San School" and "Hoh Fuk Tong College", two buildings adjacent to Hoh Fuk Tong Centre, would also have been torn down.

To protect the historic building from demolition, Morrison House was declared a proposed monument on 11 April 2003; it was later declared as monument on 26 March 2004.

== Buildings ==
The Morrison Building and the Hoh Fuk Tong Centre Building are two of the oldest buildings in the centre.

=== Morrison Building ===
Constructed in 1936, Morrison Building was the oldest building in the Hoh Fuk Tong Centre; it was the main building of the Former Dade Institute.

=== Hoh Fuk Tong Centre Building ===
Hoh Fuk Tong Centre Building was constructed in the 1940s; it had been used as the girls' dormitory of the Former Dade Institute. It was also known as the "Red House" as it was built of red bricks.
