= Pui To stop =

Coordinates: 22°23′40″N 113°58′36″E

Pui To 杯渡
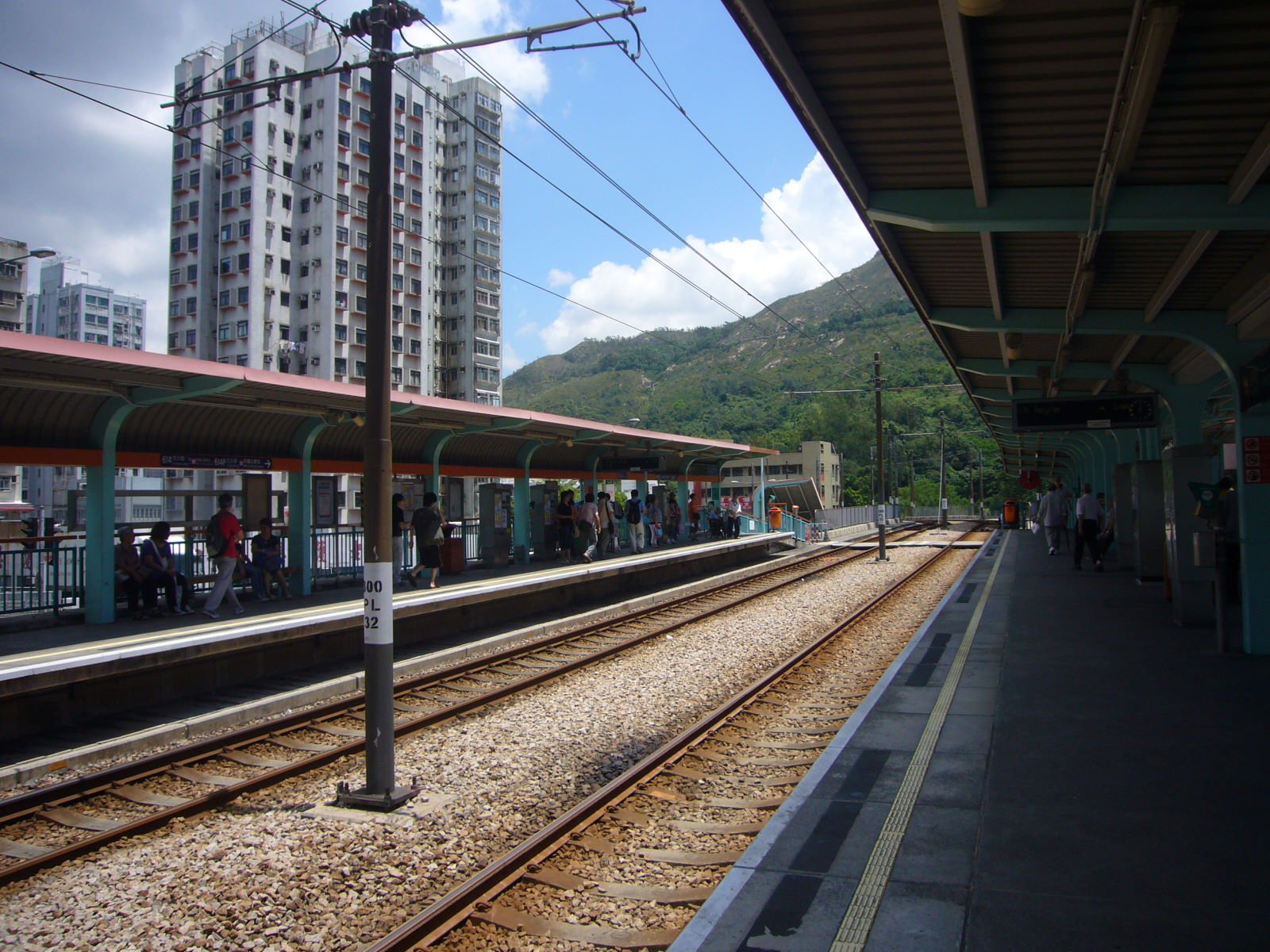
- Pui To stop platform

General information
- Location: Pui To Road; Tuen Mun District; Hong Kong
- System: MTR Light Rail stop
- Owner: KCR Corporation
- Operator: MTR Corporation
- Line: 614 614P
- Platforms: 2 side platforms
- Tracks: 2
- Connections: Bus, minibus

Construction
- Structure type: Elevated
- Accessible: yes

Other information
- Station code: PUT (English code); 300 (Digital code)
- Fare zone: 2

History
- Opened: 2 February 1992; 34 years ago

Services
Preceding stop	MTR Light Rail	Following stop
Town Centre towards Tuen Mun Ferry Pier	614	Hoh Fuk Tong towards Yuen Long
Town Centre towards Tuen Mun Ferry Pier	614P	Hoh Fuk Tong towards Siu Hong
Location
- Location within MTR

Pui To (Chinese: 杯渡) is one of the MTR Light Rail stops. It is elevated at Pui To Road and Castle Peak Road in Tuen Mun District. It began service on 2 February 1992 and belongs to Zone 2.

The stop has reserved area for the construction of the branch line to Chi Lok Fa Yuen, but the plan was left out due to insufficient population in Chi Lok Fa Yuen area.
