= San Hui =

Area of Tuen Mun District, Hong Kong

Coordinates: 22°24′2.1″N 113°58′50.8″E

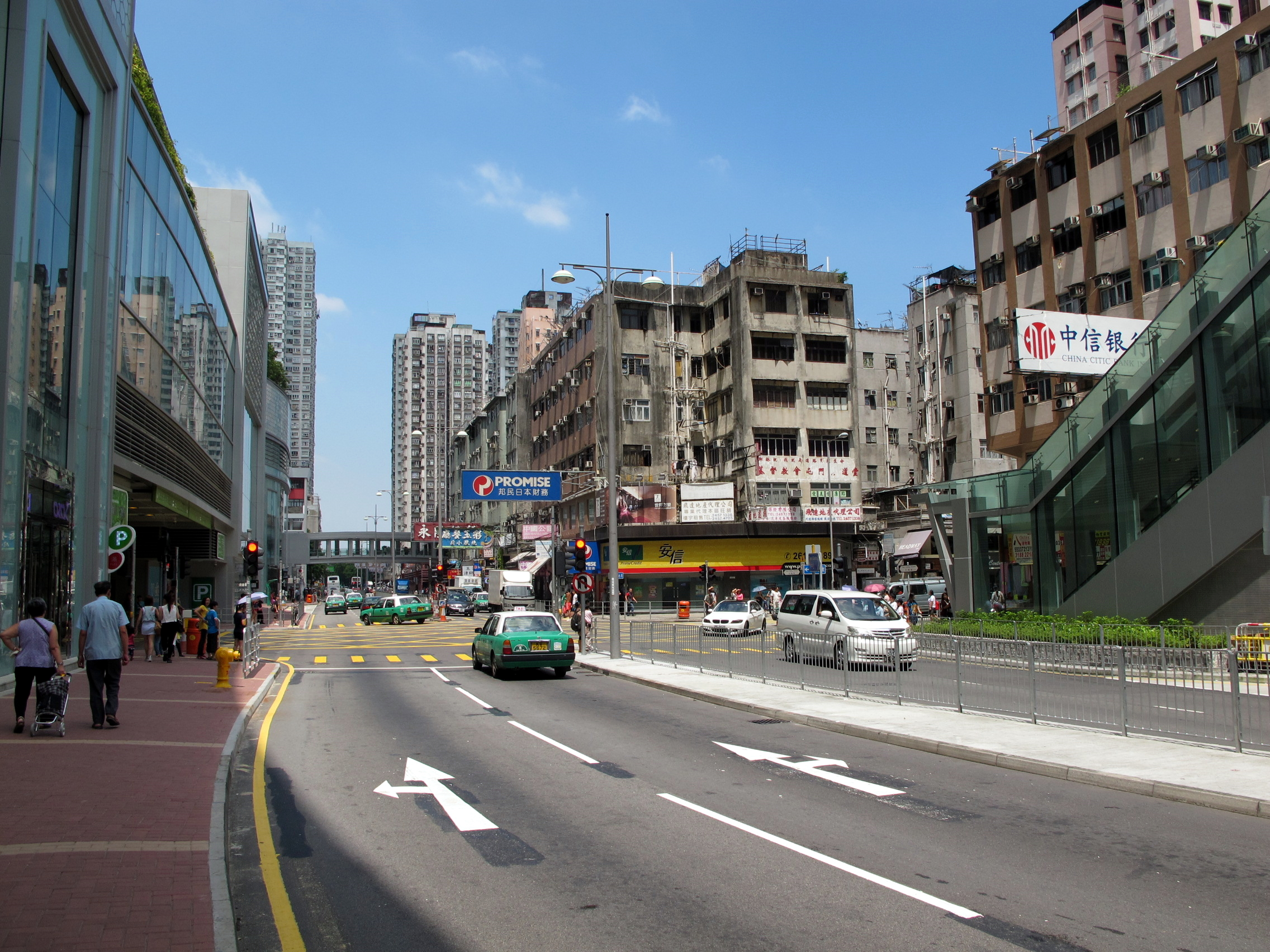
San Hui

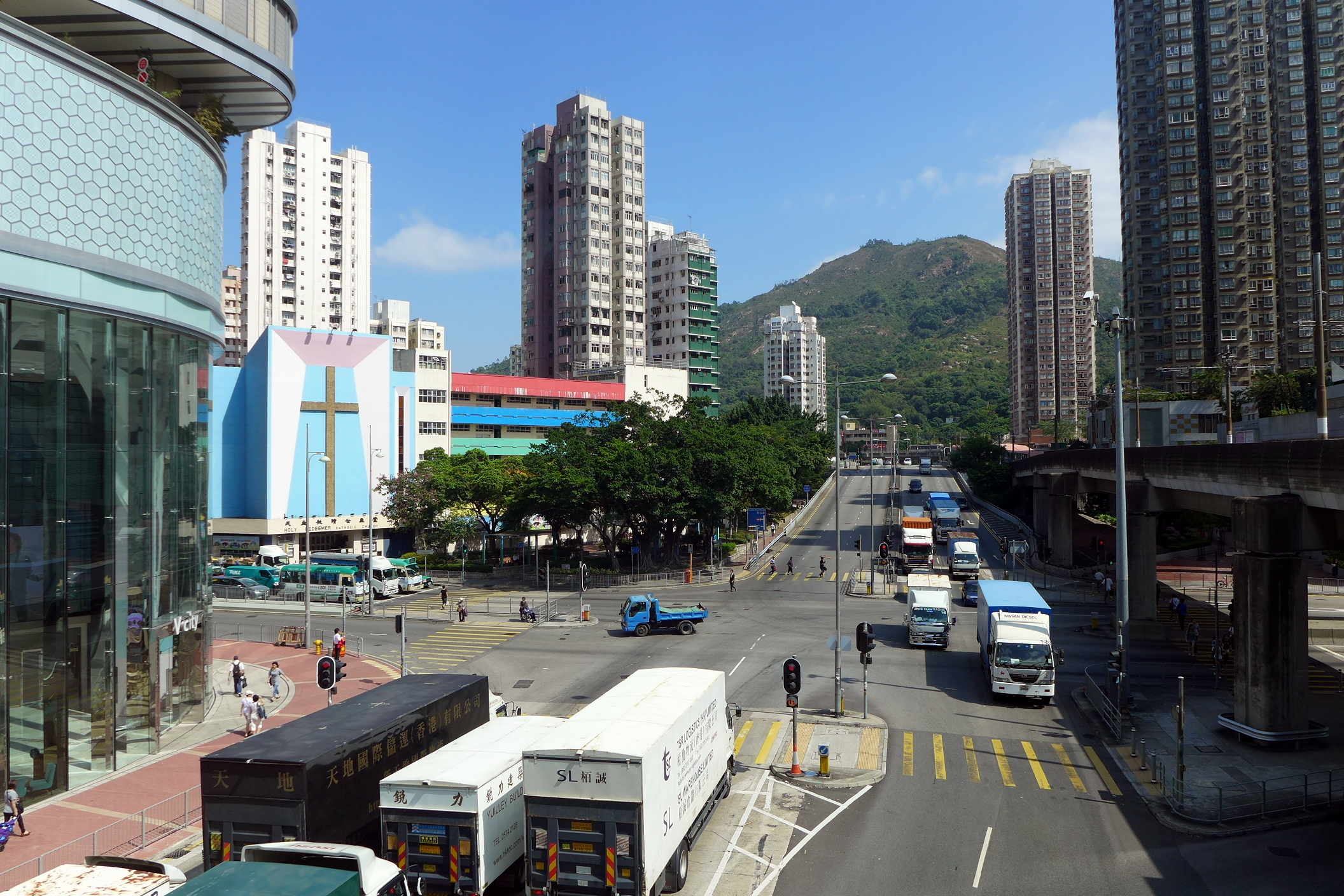
Pui To Road

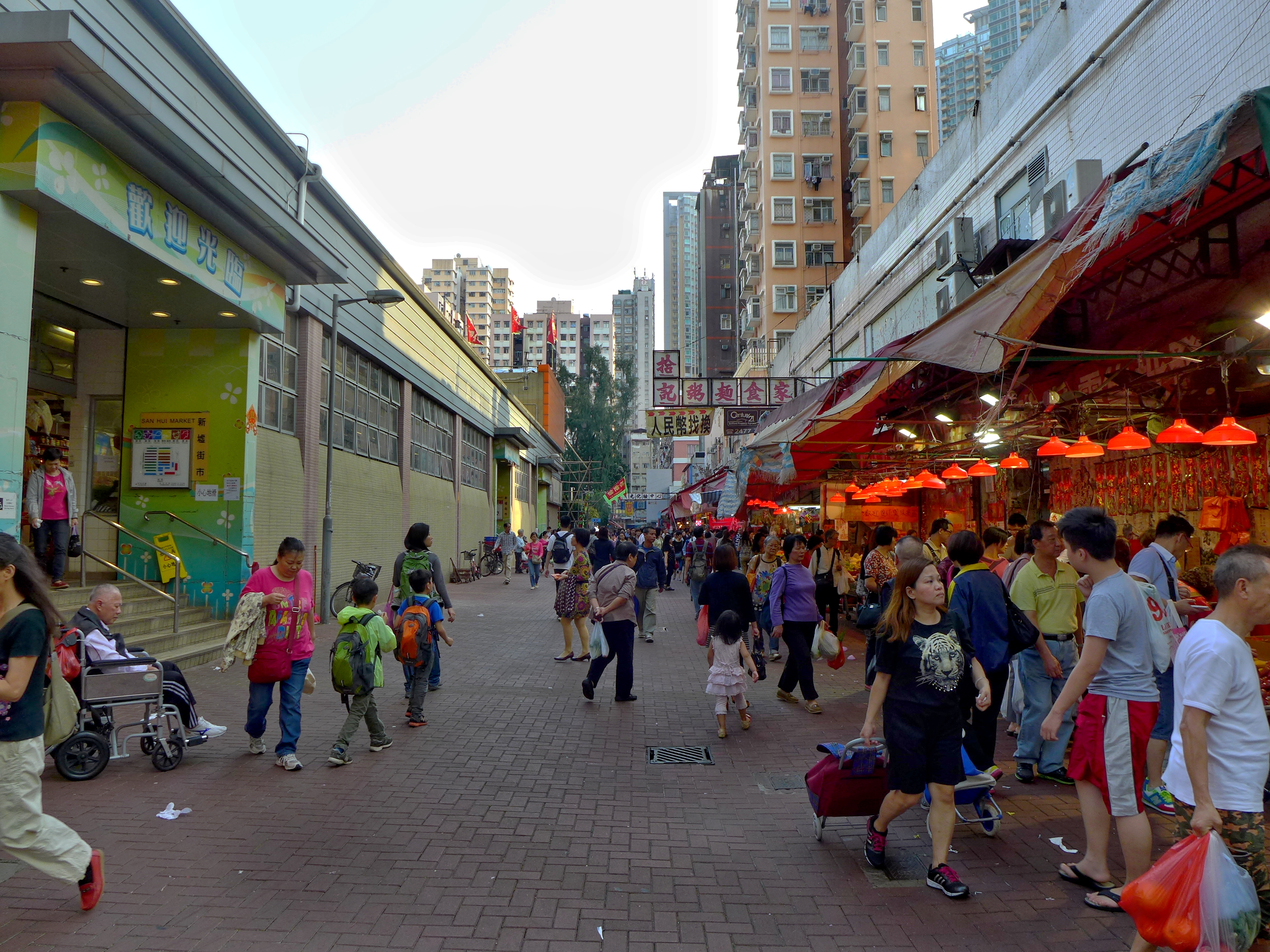
San Hui market

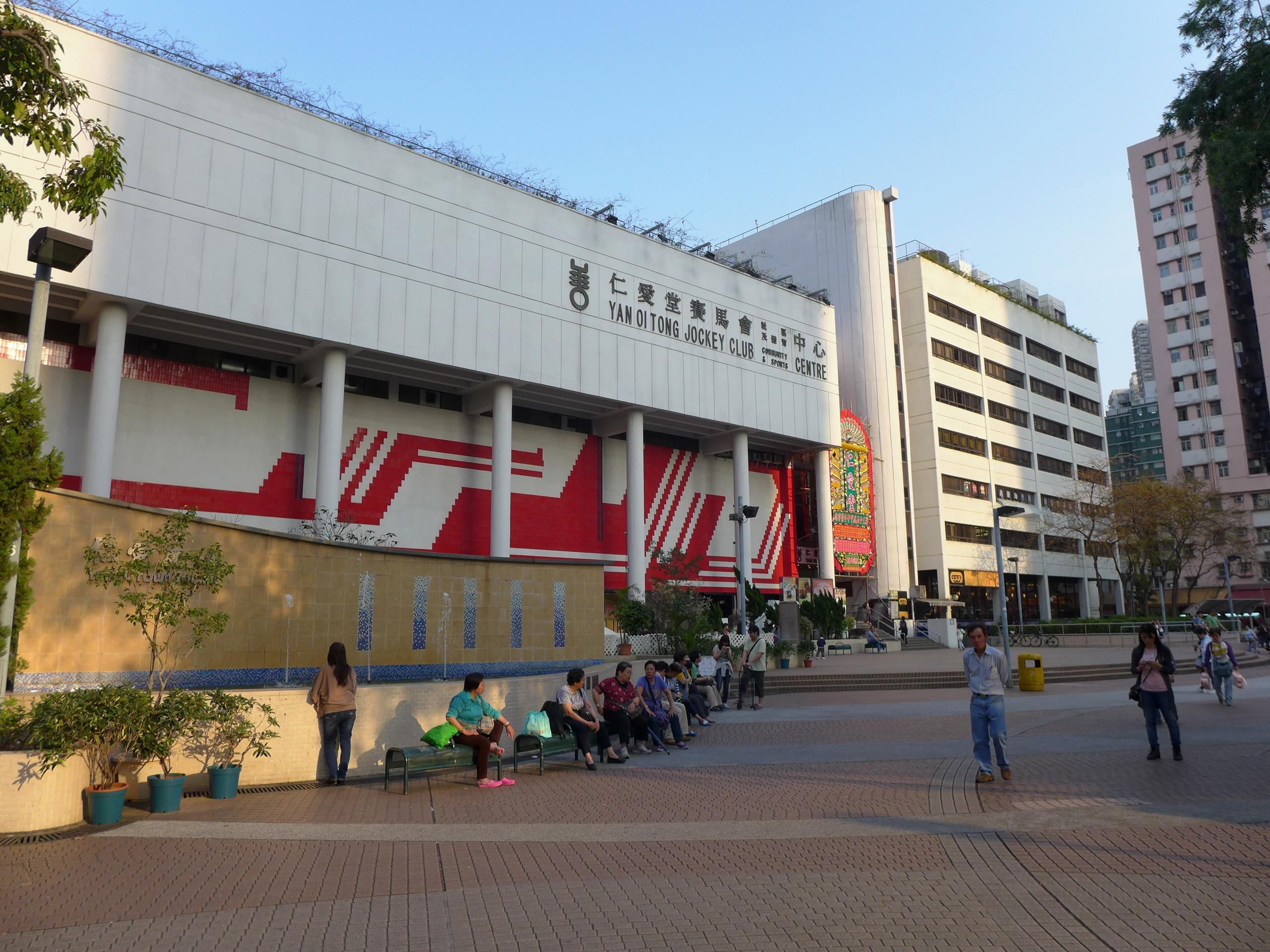
Yan Oi Tong Jockey Club Centre

Tuen Mun San Hui (Chinese: 屯門新墟) more commonly known as just San Hui (新墟) is an area of Tuen Mun District, Hong Kong and is a major food market and commercial quarter in the district. In urban planning, it is part of Tuen Mun New Town (Tuen Mun).

== Etymology ==
San Hui (Chinese: 新墟) means a 'new market' in Cantonese and is referred as such in contrast to Kau Hui (Chinese: 舊墟; Jyutping: gau6 heoi1; Cantonese Yale: gauh hēui), which means the 'old market'.

== History ==
=== The market and the area ===
By the time Tuen Mun was designated as the site of a new town in 1972, San Hui had already grown into an established market in the district. The market was founded on the site of the present Eldo Court, which was once a small hill on the former northern edge of Castle Peak Bay and also the lowest bridging point in Tuen Mun before successive reclamation projects moved the shoreline further south. The market was established next to the newly built New Territories circular road:

As the main circular road was intended to facilitate the movement of troops, it avoided the centres of population. Of course, this new facility was just the thing to stimulate development.…At Castle Peak, the road was on the opposite side of the river estuary from the town of Tuen Mun, so a San Hui, or New Market, was built alongside the road.…

— Denis Bray, Hong Kong Metamorphosis (2001)

The shops of the original market town were moved into a purpose built complex to the south of the original site in the 1980s and the structure has since undergone several major changes, receiving a new exterior design, a new western entrance and air conditioning, but also losing its rooftop garden when the last was added to accommodate shafts and condensers.

The area around it probably came to be known as San Hui in the 1960s, when reclamation of the bay created new land for developments and resulted in an urban settlement with a social life centred on the market itself.

=== New Town's new market ===
The market thrived with the growth of the new town and, despite the creation of a planned town centre several hundred yards to the south, continued as a popular destination for shoppers and remained a hub for local businesses. A healthy and interesting mix was on offer, including a variety of restaurants, three theatres, several banks, clinics and pharmacies, hairdressers and boutiques, and even a Sunday market offering produce from farms and villages in the district. In short, the pedestrian precinct outside of the market was the high street of the new town short of a proper name plate.

=== Decline ===
The area witnessed a general decline at the turn of the century though, when the new town centre matured and every plot in the area had been built over and major developments would not be seen for almost a decade, and the fact that the population in the area began to age did not help. Branches of each of two leading banks in Hong Kong, and almost every Chinese restaurant in the area, would go eventually. This was accentuated by the Asian financial crisis, which took Hong Kong a while to get over. At one time, almost all shops in one shopping centre, except those fronting the original site of the market, were vacant.

The area has drawn new visitors from mainland China since the opening of the Deep Bay Link in 2007, which shortened journey times to Shenzhen, as well as Hong Kong citizens resident the way over buying daily necessities, probably due to concerns over the safety of food sold on the other side of the border.

== Administration ==
Tuen Mun San Hui is a recognized village under the New Territories Small House Policy.

== Education ==
San Hui is in Primary One Admission (POA) School Net 71. Within the school net are multiple aided schools (operated independently but funded with government money); no government schools are in the school net.

== Declared monument ==
The Morrison Building in the Hoh Fuk Tong Centre, built in 1936 and named after the missionary Robert Morrison, was recognised as a declared monument in 2004.

== See also ==
- San Hui stop, a MTR Light Rail station
