= Castle Peak Beach =

Beach in Tuen Mun, New Territories, Hong Kong

Coordinates: 22.379232°N 113.980156°E

- Beach
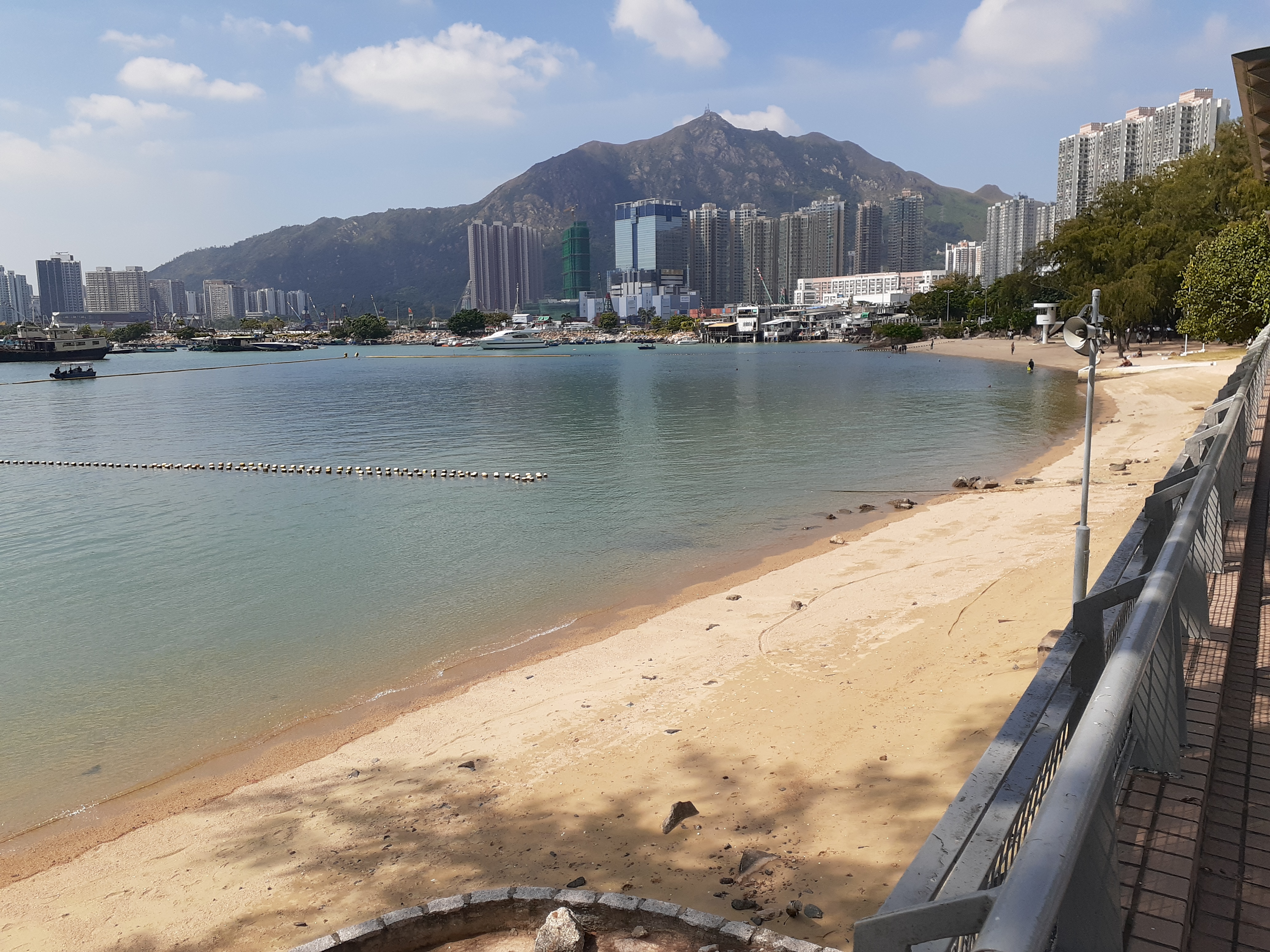
- Castle Peak Beach in November 2019
- Location: Tuen Mun, Hong Kong

Dimensions
  - Length: 200 metres
- Patrolled by: Leisure and Cultural Services Department
- Access: Castle Peak Road

Castle Peak Beach (Chinese: 青山灣泳灘) is a gazetted beach in Tuen Mun, Hong Kong, beside Sam Shing Estate. It looks onto Castle Peak Bay and the Tuen Mun typhoon shelter, although it is separated from the typhoon shelter by a breakwater.

The beach comprises 2.97 hectares and has a swimming zone of 0.8 hectares protected by a shark net. It was closed from 1981 to 2005 due to water pollution. In the summer months it is staffed by lifeguards of the Leisure and Cultural Services Department (LCSD).

== History ==
Historically, the beach was known as Yung Lung Beach (Chinese: 容龍泳灘) and was a very attractive place for swimming. It was closed for swimming in 1981 due to poor water quality. In September 1983, the beach was badly damaged by a typhoon that caused the loss of sand and trees.

In November 1994, the Tuen Mun District Board made a request to open the beach for swimming and leisure. In response, the Regional Council built several facilities at a cost of HK$97 million including a barbecue area, a sitting-out area, a children's play area, and a two-storey beach building with toilets, changing rooms and showers. In November 1999, the beach was handed over to the Regional Services Department. However, the beach was still not opened for swimming owing to a layer of mud and refuse on the seabed. In May 2000, the beach facilities were opened to public use, though the water remained off-limits.

From December 2001 to August 2002, the then-Civil Engineering Department (CED) undertook dredging and sand-filling works at a cost of $1.9 million. The layer of soft mud was removed to improve the water quality. However, in October 2002, the CED reported that the beach was still not suitable for swimming, and the LCSD decided the beach would continue to be closed.

Other attempts to improve water quality were made over the years. In 1993, a new trunk sewer was built along Castle Peak Road, from So Kwun Wat to Sam Shing Estate, directing sewage from the hinterland to the Pillar Point Sewage Treatment Works. Additionally, the North Western Water Control Zone was declared under the Water Pollution Control Ordinance, controlling pollution. In 1999, a longer submarine outfall came into operation at the Pillar Point Sewage Treatment Works, directing effluent farther away from the beaches. In the early 2000s, two dry weather flow interceptors were installed along the Tuen Mun River, which discharges into Castle Peak Bay, to intercept village sewage and other pollutants before it reaches the river.

A shark net was installed on 24 May 2005. After 24 years of closure, the beach was reopened for swimming on 1 June 2005.

== Facilities ==
- BBQ pits (27 nos.)
- Changing rooms and showers
- Restaurant
- Toilets

== Statistics ==
In 2019, the LCSD estimated that Castle Peak Beach saw 176,690 visitors during the bathing season. This makes it the least-visited among Tuen Mun District's six gazetted beaches.

== Water quality ==
Castle Peak had the highest mean E. coli levels of all 41 beaches monitored by the Environmental Protection Department during the 2019 bathing season.

In 2019, the water quality hovered between Grade 2 (Fair) and Grade 3 (Poor) on the four-point Beach Grading System of the Environmental Protection Department, dipping to Grade 1 (Very Poor) on one day only.

== Transport ==
The beach is within walking distance of Sam Shing stop of the Light Rail network. There is also a franchised bus stop beside the beach served by Kowloon Motor Bus, Long Win Bus, MTR Bus, and Citybus.

== See also ==
- Beaches of Hong Kong
- Golden Beach – located nearby
