= Castle Peak Bay =

Bay in Hong Kong

Coordinates: 22°22′N 113°58′E

- Traditional Chinese: 青山灣
Transcriptions
Yue: Cantonese
- Yale Romanization: Chīng sāan wāan
- Jyutping: Cing1 saan1 waan1

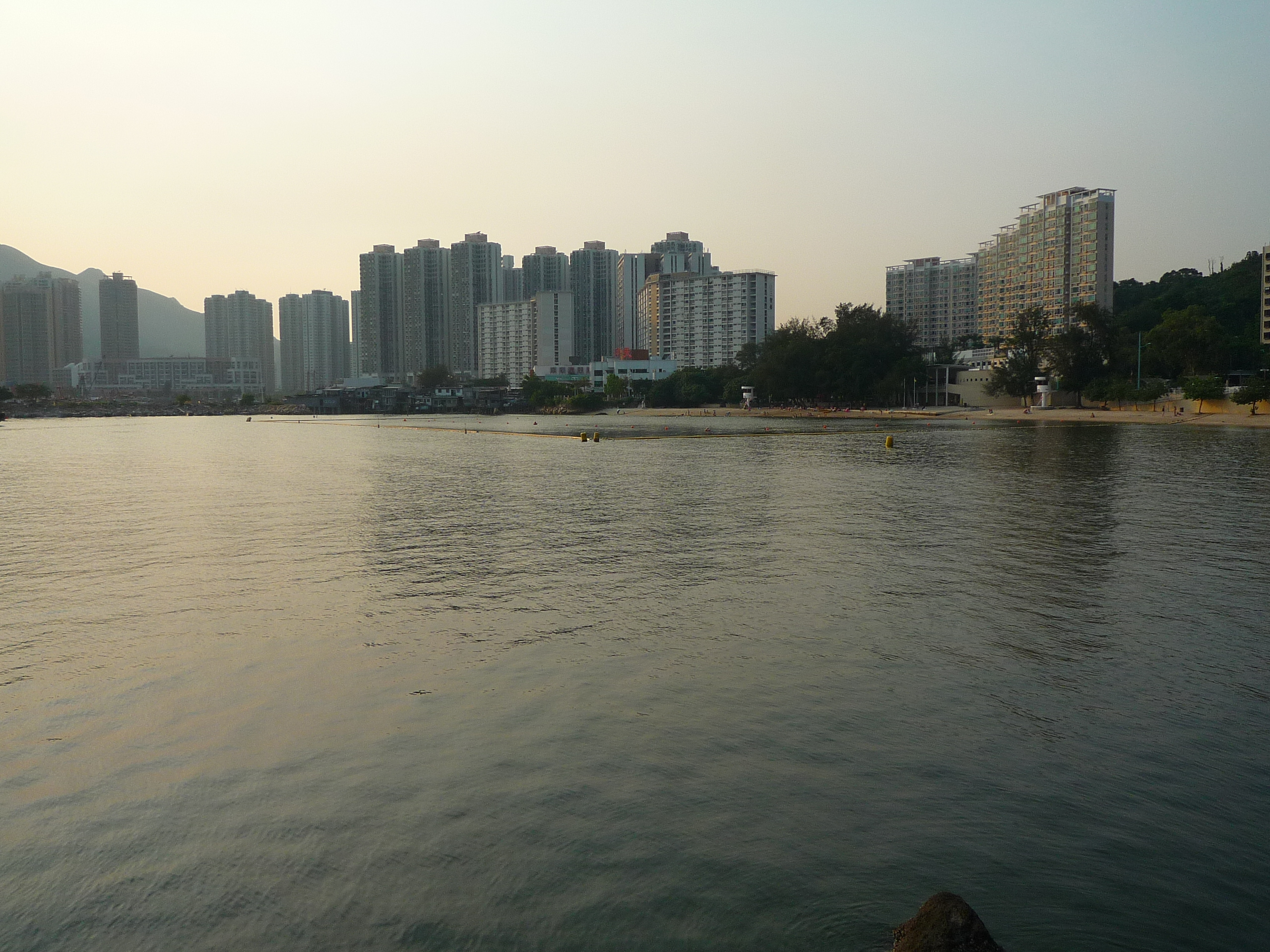
Castle Peak Bay in July 2009

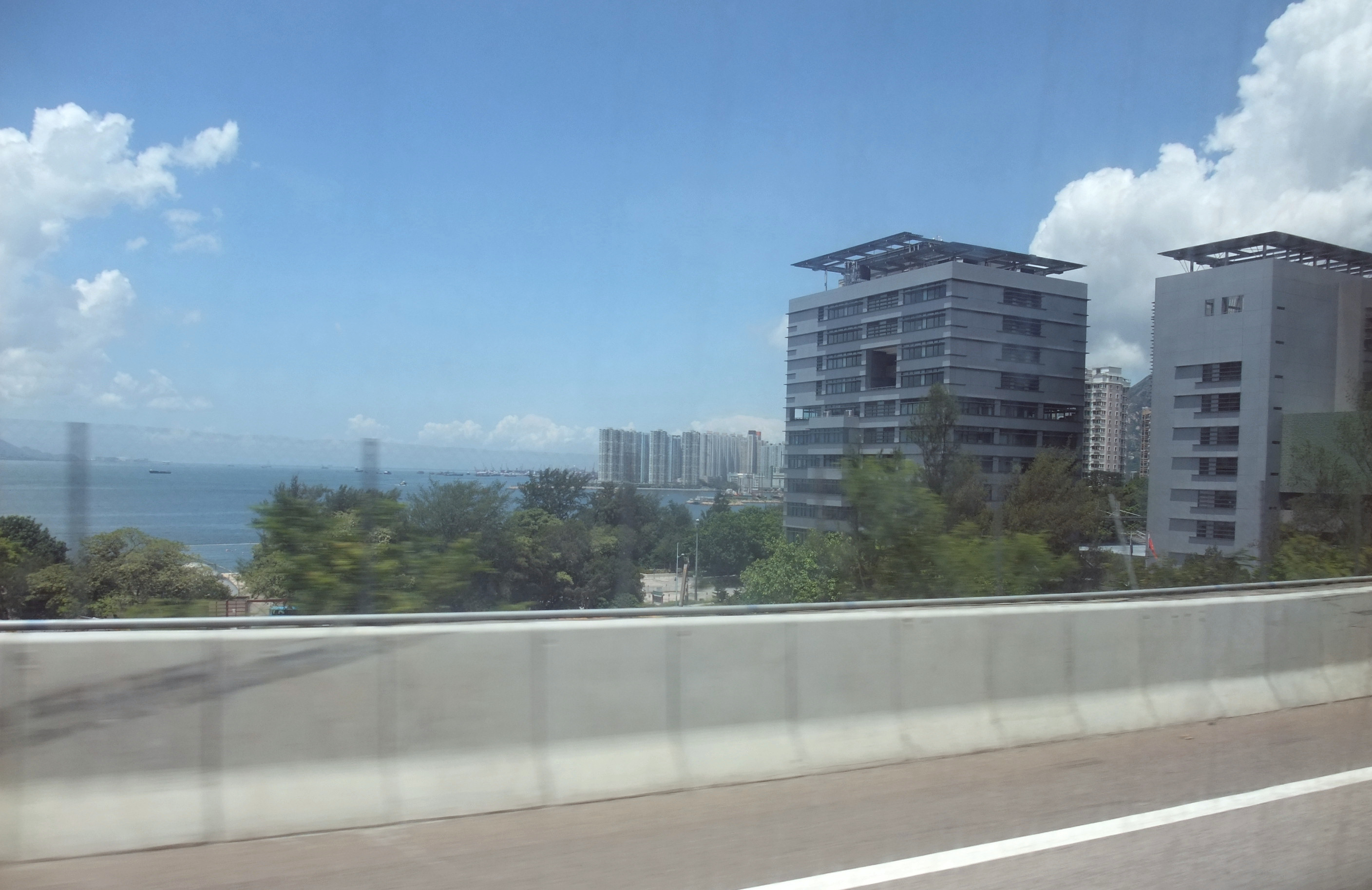
View across Castle Peak Bay from Tuen Mun Road in August 2011

Castle Peak Bay (Chinese: 青山灣) is a bay outside Tuen Mun. Tuen Mun River empties into the bay. In the past, many Tanka fishermen harboured at the bay.

In 1513, explorer Jorge Álvares arrived in the Pearl River Delta and started a Portuguese settlement, Tamão. One source specifically states that it was located at the "bay of Tunmen ... now called Castle Peak".

There are several barbecue sites and recreation facilities near the bay including the Castle Peak Beach and other beaches. Castle Peak Bay is served by MTR Bus routes K51, K58, Kowloon Motor Bus 52X and 53.
