= Tuen Mun District =

District in New Territories, Hong Kong

Tuen Mun District 屯門區
- District
- Tuen Mun
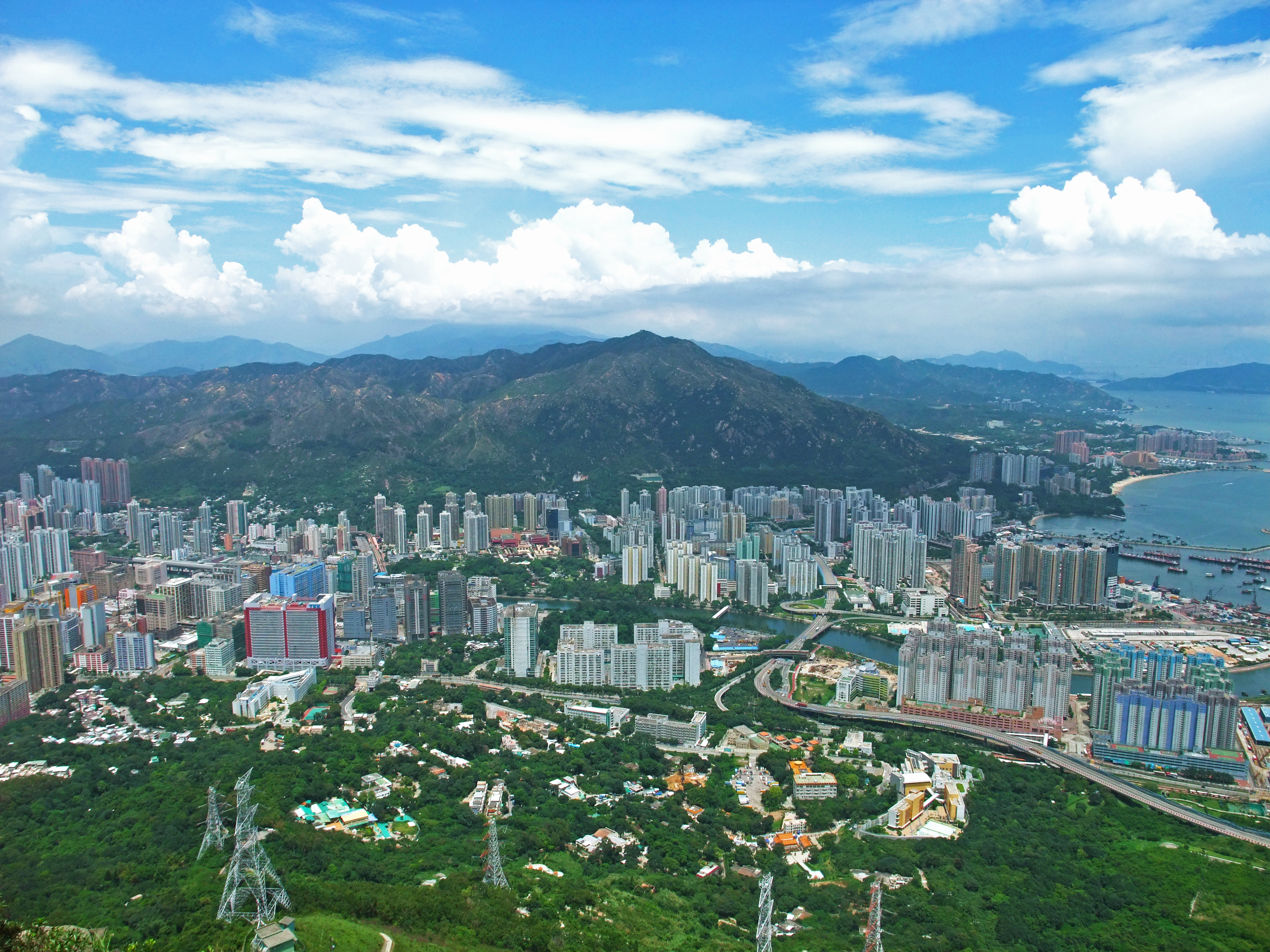
- Day view of the Tuen Mun District skyline

- Official emblem

- Location within Hong Kong
- Coordinates: 22°23′30″N 113°58′38″E
- SAR: Hong Kong
- Constituencies: 29

Government
  - Council Chairman: Chan Yau Hoi (Hong Kong Federation of Trade Unions)
  - Council Vice-Chairman: Wong Tan Ching
  - District Officer: Aubrey Fung

Area
  - Land: 84.19 km^{2} (32.51 sq mi)

Population (2021)
  - Total: 506,879
  - Density: 6,021/km^{2} (15,590/sq mi)
- Population data from 2021 census; size of the areas from Table E489 (2018 ed.)
- Time zone: UTC+8 (Hong Kong Time)

Tuen Mun District
- Traditional Chinese: 屯門區
- Simplified Chinese: 屯门区
- Jyutping: Tyun4 mun4 keoi1
Transcriptions
Standard Mandarin
- Hanyu Pinyin: Tún mén qū
Yue: Cantonese
- Yale Romanization: Tyùhn mùhn kēui
- Jyutping: Tyun4 mun4 keoi1
- IPA: [tʰyn˩.mun˩ kʰɵɥ˥]

Tuen Mun District (Chinese: 屯門區) is one of the 18 administrative districts of Hong Kong. As of 2025, the population was 545,000, of which 64,000 were under the age of 18. Part of the district is the Tuen Mun New Town (or simply Tuen Mun), which contains one of the largest residential areas in the New Territories.

== History ==
=== Etymology ===
The name Tuen Mun is thought to be short for 屯兵之門, literally translating to "door of the garrison." Other interpretations of the name include 門, which translate to "opening of the water route". The district was named after the Tuen Mun area.

=== Before the establishment of the district ===
Tuen Mun was a major trading port, with garrison stationed there as early as the Tang dynasty, and the geological features described in historical literature match those of modern day Tuen Mun. However, the interpretation of the location of Tuen Mun is widely disputed, and it has been suggested that the historic Tuen Mun may actually refer to Nantou in modern day Shenzhen, although this has been disputed by Lau Chi-pang.

The area around Tuen Mun, excluding Tai Lam and Lung Kwu Tan, was placed under the Yuen Long yeuk (Chinese: 約; Jyutping: joek3; Cantonese Yale: yeuk) soon after the signing of the Convention for the Extension of Hong Kong Territory in 1898. The convention leased the New Territories and New Kowloon to the British Empire as an extension of the Colony of Hong Kong. Before the lease, Tuen Mun was part of the Xin'an County, and Tuen Mun village was under the administration of Wu-dou (Chinese: 五都). Also under Wu-dou were Kam Tin, Ping Shan, Yuen Long and Shek Kong, which are areas of the modern-day Yuen Long District.

Soon after, the District Office North (not to be confused with the modern-day North District) was established to administer the New Territories including Tuen Mun. After World War II, the Yuen Long District Office split from the District Office North.

Tuen Mun and its surrounding area were administratively part of Yuen Long District Office until 1974.

While originally named Castle Peak New Town during its planning, the new town of the area was finally named Tuen Mun New Town, adopting the historic name of the region in 1972. The new town was built on reclaimed land from the Castle Peak Bay, as well as levelled hillside areas starting from the 1960s.

The New Town also incorporated Tuen Mun San Hui, a rural market township, as part of the New Town's town centre.

=== Establishment to present ===
In 1982, the Tuen Mun District Council (initially Tuen Mun District Board) was established as part of the political reform of the district-level government.

The Tuen Mun District includes Tuen Mun New Town, as well as other areas and villages. In the 2010s, the government announced the construction of a new satellite town in Hung Shui Kiu, an area that consists of several villages and administrations spanning between Tuen Mun and Yuen Long Districts.

== Council ==
Tuen Mun District Council is one of the 18 district councils of Hong Kong. The Council consists of 32 members, including 6 elected members, 12 members from the District Committees constituency, 13 appointed members, and 1 ex-officio member. The latest election was held in 2023.

== Tourist attractions ==
Some of Tuen Mun's tourist attractions include:

- Dragon Boat Racing at Castle Peak Bay, held every year during the Tuen Ng Festival.
- Tuen Mun Park and its reptile house.
- Tuen Mun Public Riding School.
- The Hong Kong Gold Coast tourist resort.

== Places of worship ==
Tuen Mun's places of worship include:

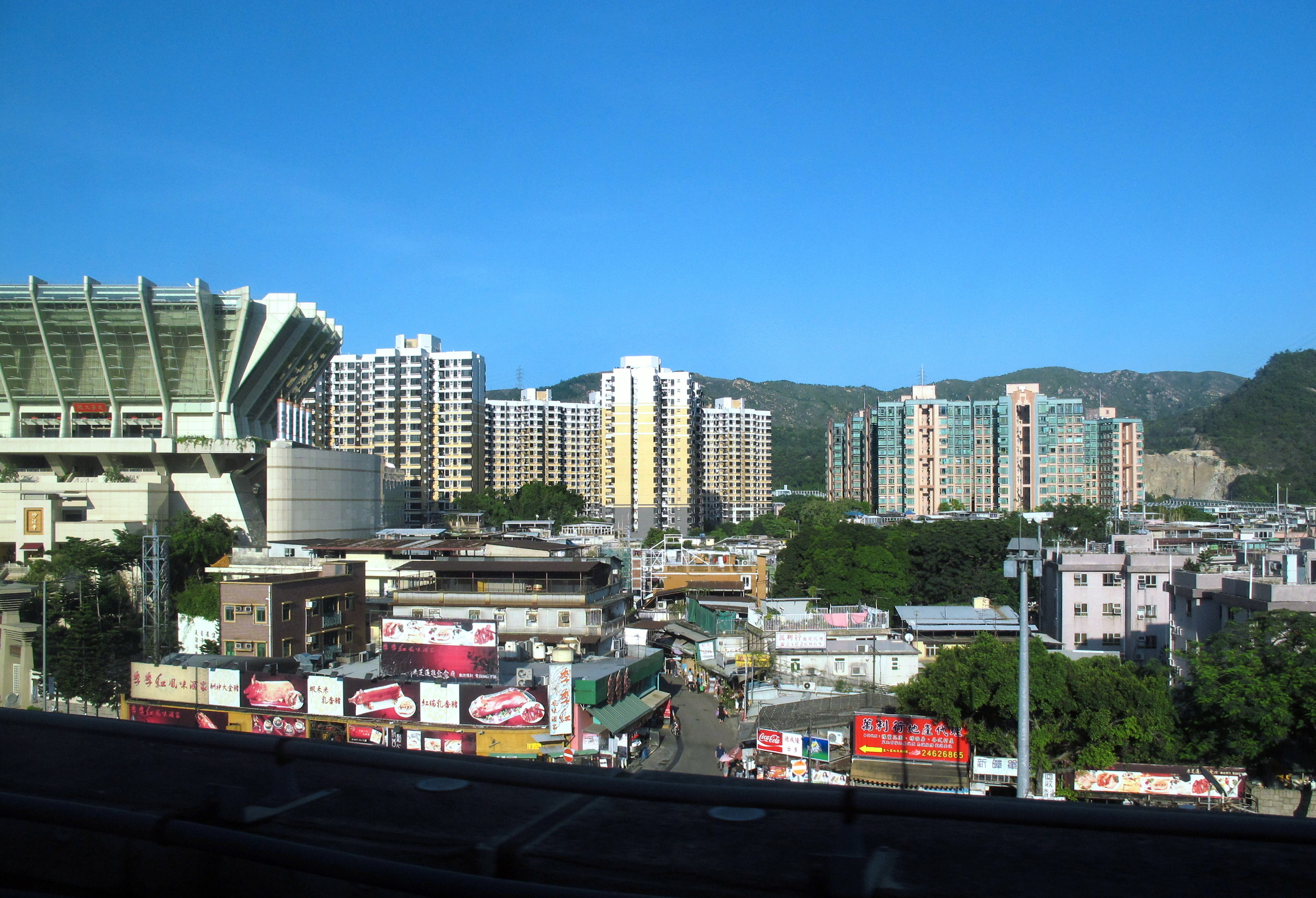
Miu Fat Buddhist Monastery (left) in Lam Tei

- Ching Leung Nunnery
- Tsing Shan Monastery
- Ching Chung Koon
- Miu Fat Buddhist Monastery
- Hau Kok Tin Hau Temple

== Public facilities ==
=== Town Hall ===
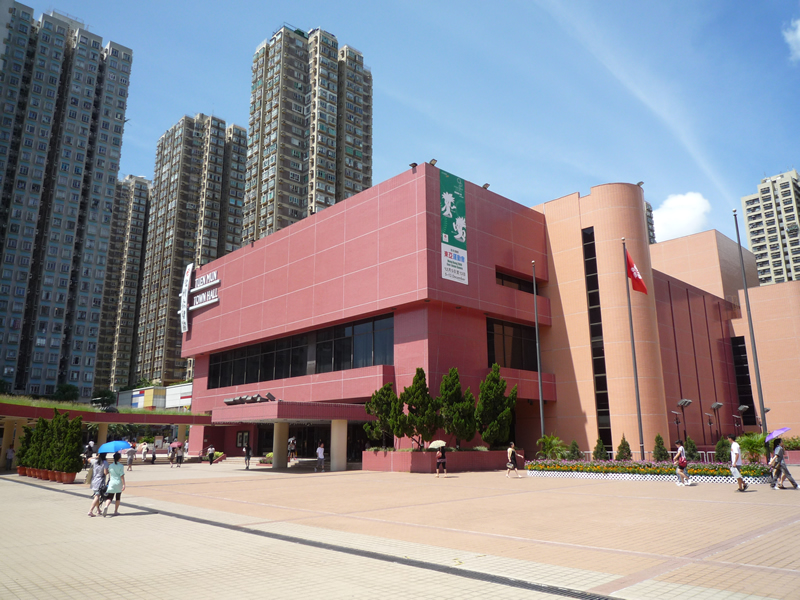
Tuen Mun Town Hall

The Tuen Mun Town Hall is a cultural complex building managed by the Leisure and Cultural Services Department.

=== Swimming pools ===
There are three public swimming pools in Tuen Mun District:

- Tuen Mun Swimming Pool, located on Hoi Wong Road, was permanently closed from 1 January 2026
- The Jockey Club Yan Oi Tong Swimming Pool, located on Tsing Chung Koon Road.
- Tuen Mun North West Swimming Pool, located on Ming Kum Road near Po Tin Estate.

=== Beaches ===
There are six beaches in the Tuen Mun District:

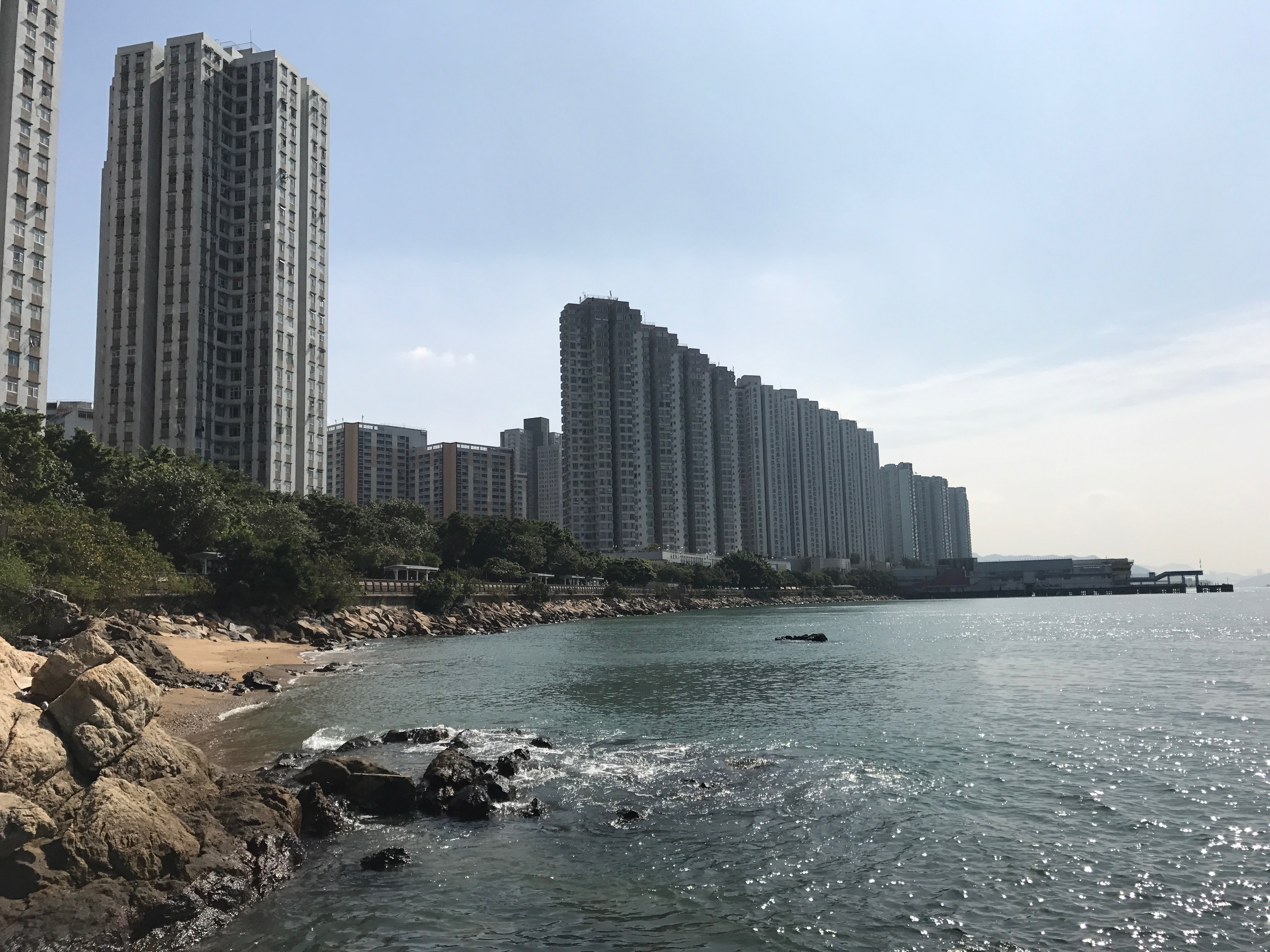
Butterfly Bay, Tuen Mun, NT, Hong Kong in 2017

- Butterfly Beach
- Castle Peak Beach
- Kadoorie Beach
- Cafeteria Old Beach
- Cafeteria New Beach
- Golden Beach (Hong Kong)

=== Public libraries ===
There are three public libraries: Tuen Mun Central Library, Butterfly Estate Public Library and Tai Hing Public Library.

=== Football ===
Tuen Mun SA are based in Tuen Mun Tang Shiu Kin Sports Ground and feature in the Hong Kong Second Division League.

=== EcoPark ===
EcoPark is an industrial park dedicated to recycling and environmental industry, and aims at promoting waste recycling in Hong Kong. Phase I of the EcoPark (about 80,000 square meters) will be made available for occupation by end 2006, while Phase II (about 120,000 square meters) will be commissioned in 2009.

=== Power stations ===
There are two power stations to the west of Tuen Mun, which are run by CLP Power Hong Kong Limited, called Black Point Power Station and Castle Peak Power Station.

=== Hospitals ===
There are three hospitals in Tuen Mun District in total: Castle Peak Hospital, Tuen Mun Hospital and Siu Lam Hospital.

== Education ==
There are currently 50 secondary schools, 56 primary schools and 50 kindergartens in Tuen Mun. There are also 5 special schools for mentally or physically disabled children.

Hong Kong Public Libraries operates three libraries in the district: Butterfly Estate, Tai Hing, and Tuen Mun.

=== Lingnan University ===
Lingnan University, previously situated at Stubbs Road on Hong Kong Island, moved to its present campus site at Fu Tei in 1995. It is the only tertiary institution in Hong Kong to offer a purely humanities curriculum.

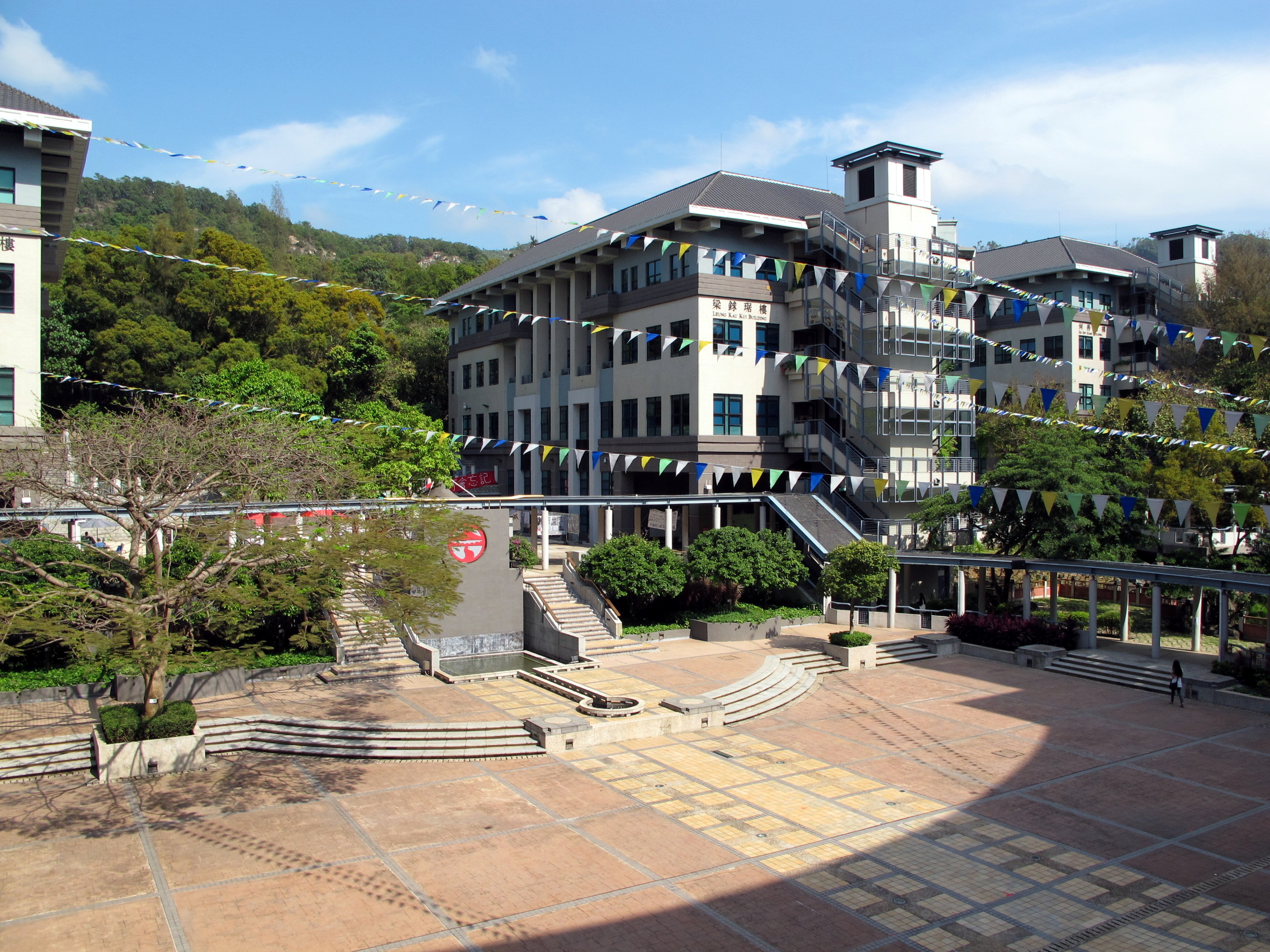
Lingnan University

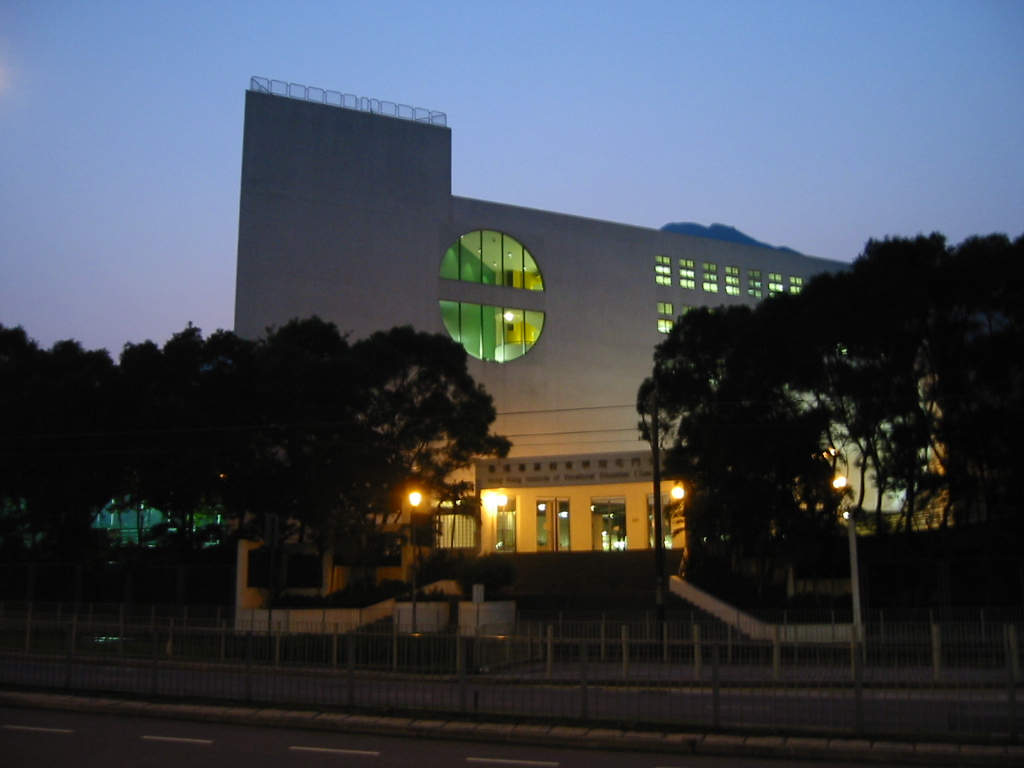
IVE Tuen Mun

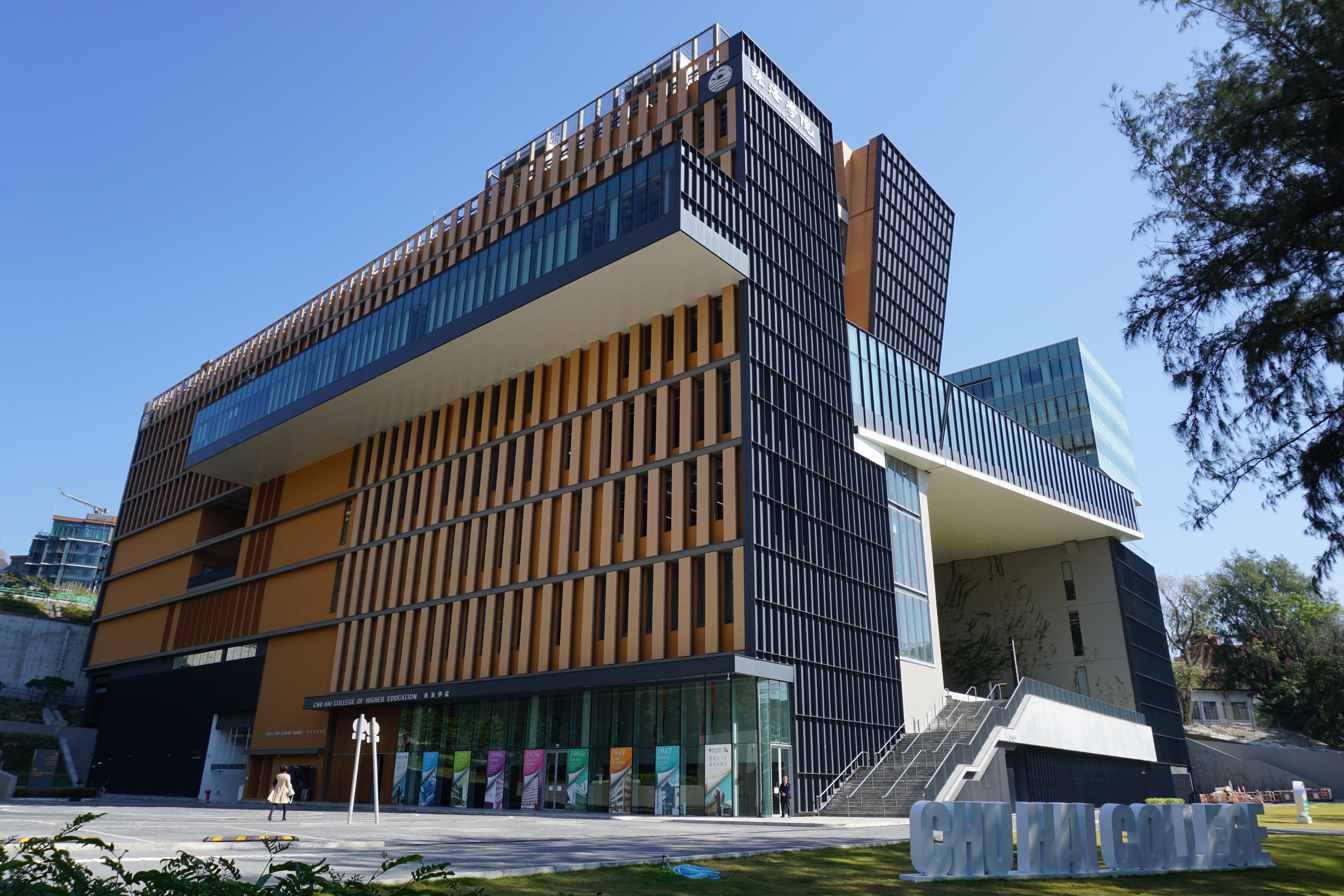
Chu Hai College of Higher Education

== Transport ==
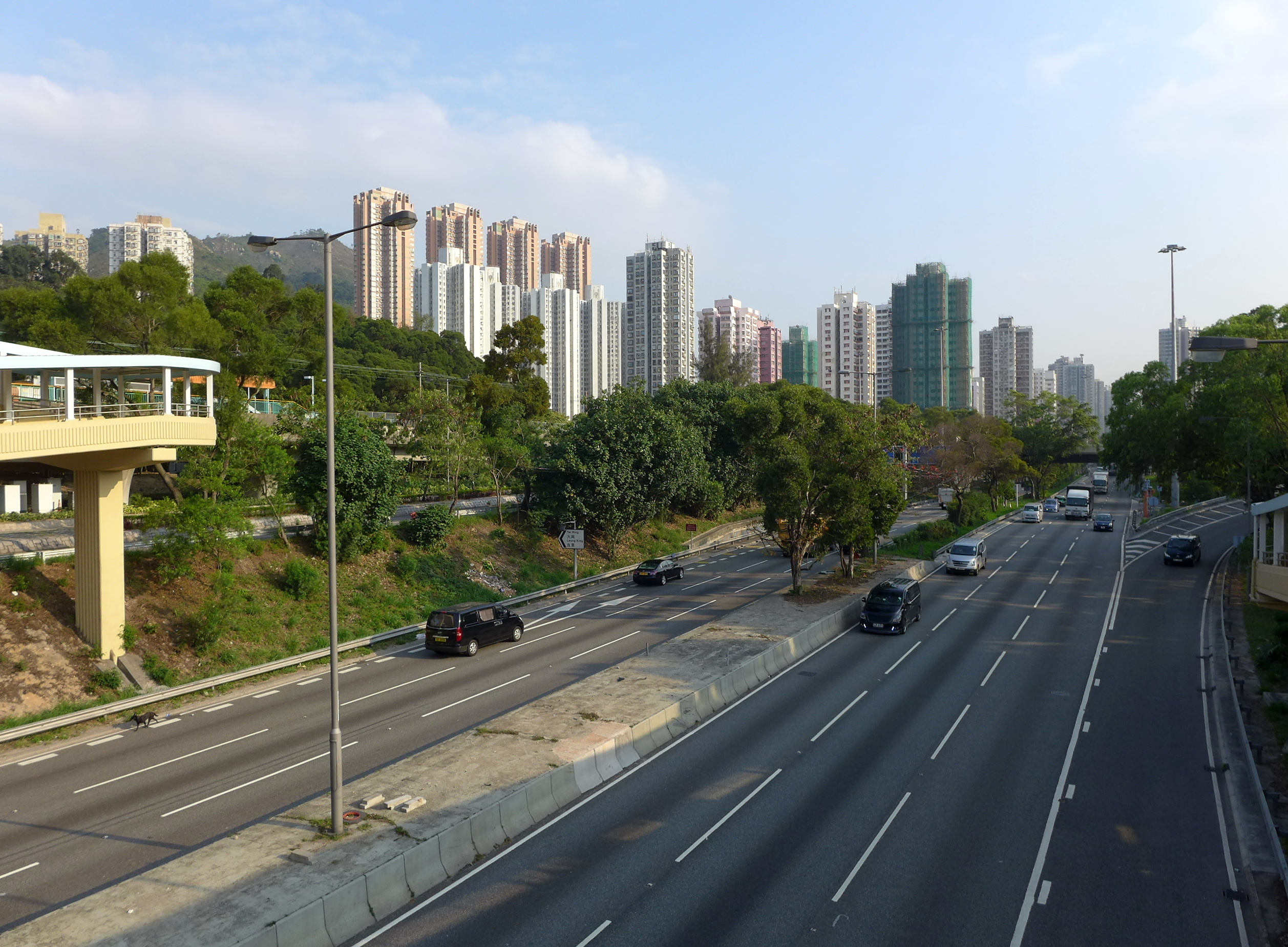
Tuen Mun Road-Siu Hong Section

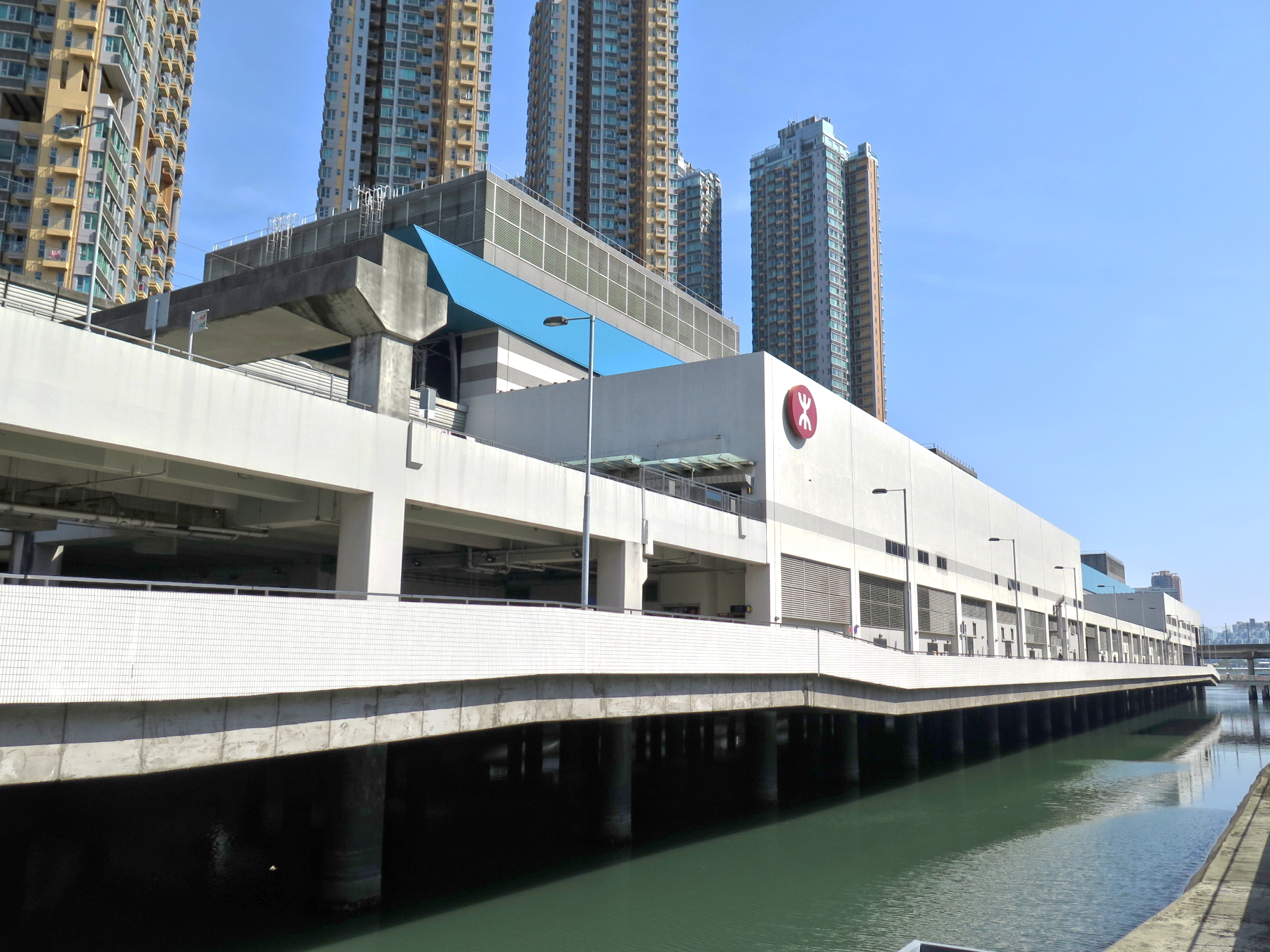
Tuen Mun Station

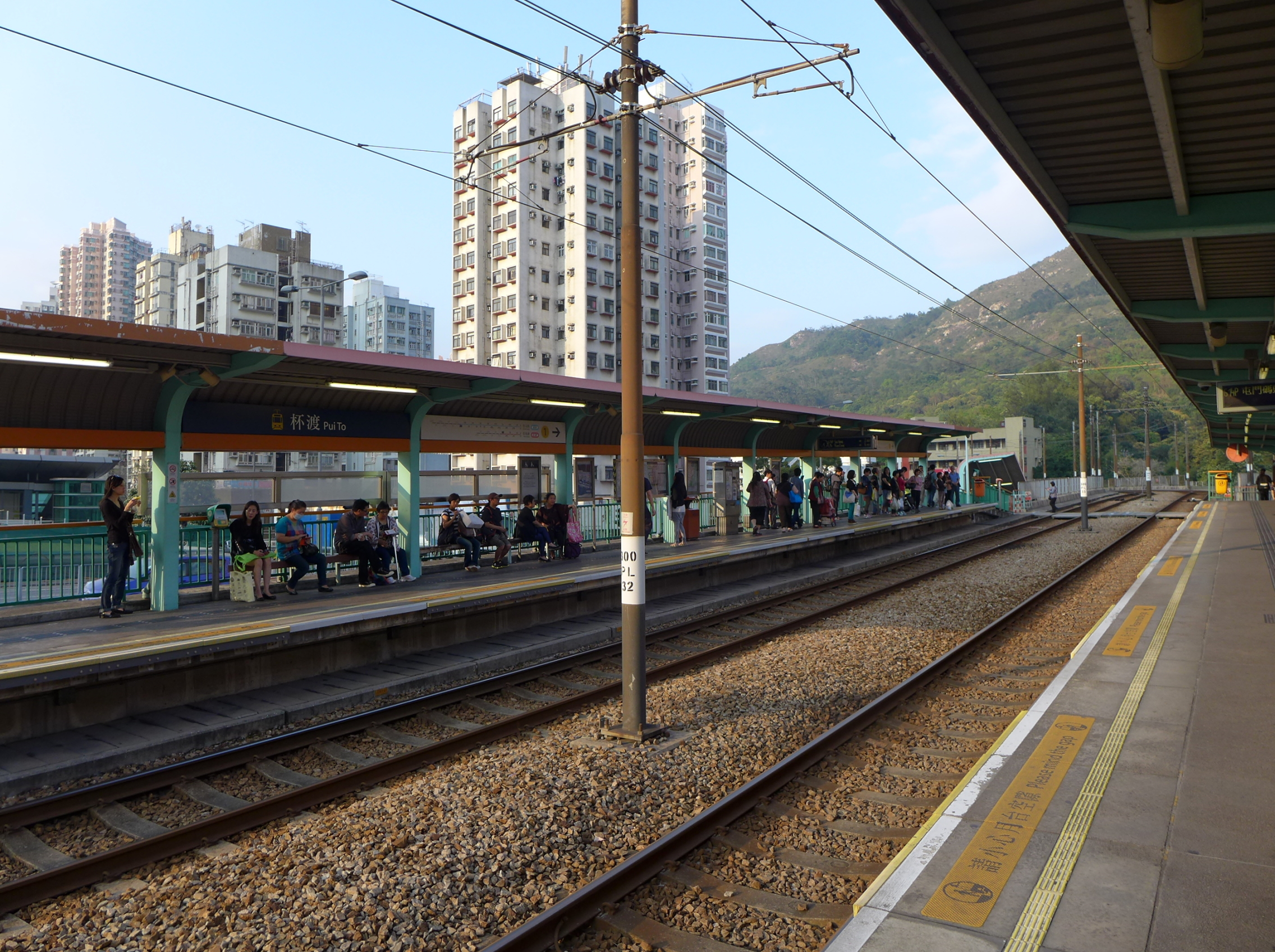
Pui To stop

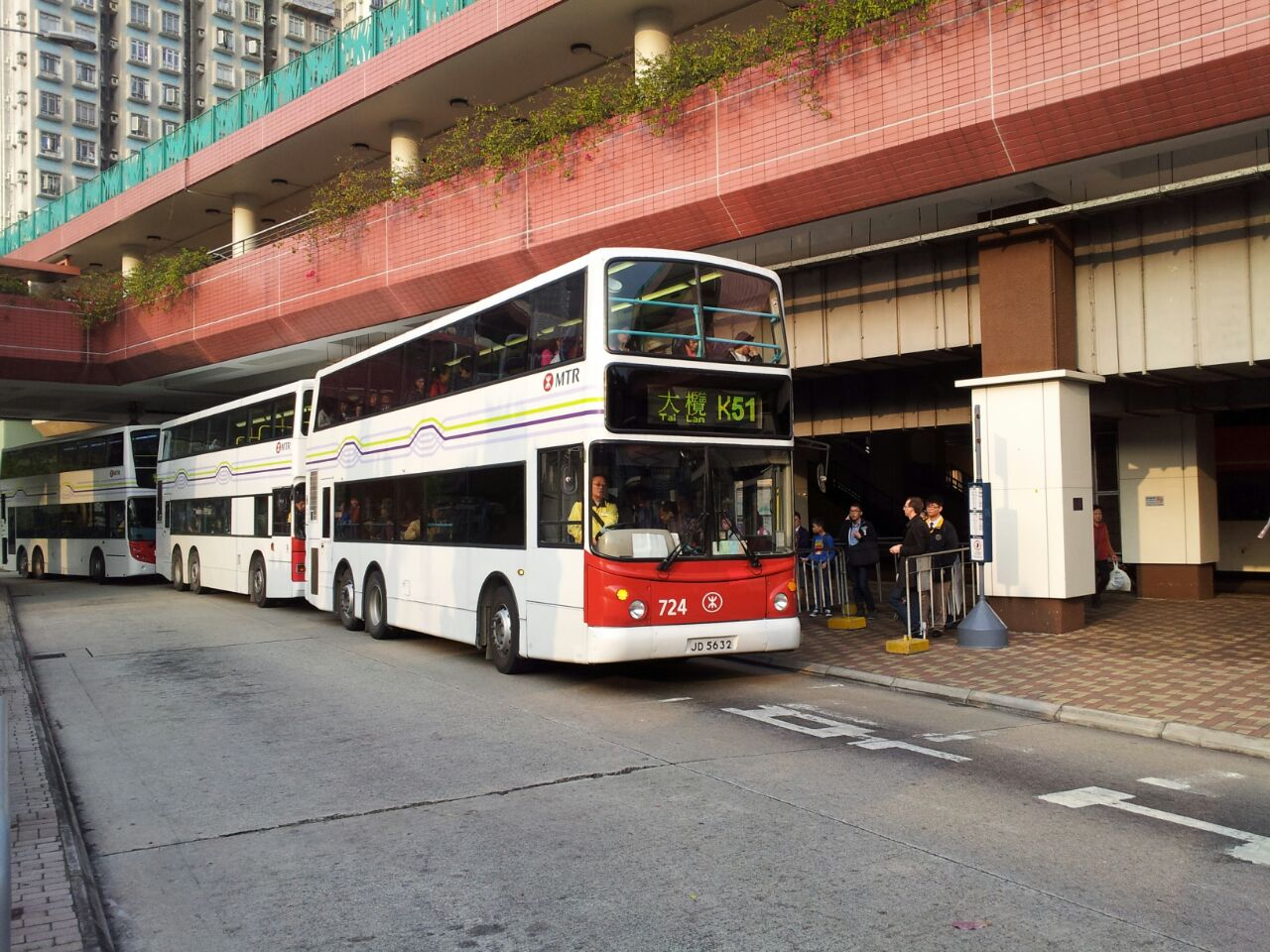
MTR bus

Until the West Rail line was opened in 2003, the Tuen Mun District was only connected to the urban area via the Tuen Mun Road and the Castle Peak Road. Citizens can also use the bus to go into the city, and also the Light Rail to connect to Yuen Long District.

=== Railways ===
- Tuen Ma line - Tuen Mun Station, Siu Hong Station, Hung Shui Kiu station (planned)
- Light Rail - Route 505, 507, 610, 614, 614P, 615, 615P and 751

=== Main roads ===
There was only one highway into Tuen Mun from Kowloon and Hong Kong Island before 2020. Because the Tuen Mun Road was loaded with traffic pressure from Yuen Long District, citizens often suffered from traffic jams until the Tsing Long Highway was opened since 2003. The Tuen Mun–Chek Lap Kok Link was opened in 2020, allowing a faster connection to the Hong Kong International Airport.

== See also ==
- Fernao Pires de Andrade
- List of buildings, sites and areas in Hong Kong
