= Public housing estates in Tsuen Wan =

Public housing in Tsuen Wan, Hong Kong

The following is a list of public housing estates in Tsuen Wan, Hong Kong, including Home Ownership Scheme (HOS), Private Sector Participation Scheme (PSPS), Sandwich Class Housing Scheme (SCHS), Flat-for-Sale Scheme (FFSS), and Tenants Purchase Scheme (TPS) estates.

== Overview ==
Name		Type	Inaug.	No Blocks	No Units	Notes
Cheung Shan Estate	象山邨	Public	1978	3	1,621	
Fuk Loi Estate	福來邨	Public	1963	9	3,129	
Lei Muk Shue (I) Estate	梨木樹(一)邨	Public	1999	3	2,317	
Lei Muk Shue (II) Estate	梨木樹(二)邨	Public	1975	11	4,313	
Lei Muk Shue Estate	梨木樹邨	Public	1970, 2005	5	3,901	
Shek Wai Kok Estate	石圍角邨	Public	1980	8	6,491	
Moon Lok Dai Ha	滿樂大廈	Public	1964	4	947	HK Housing Society
Clague Garden Estate	祈德尊新邨	Flat-for-Sale/Rental	1989	3	1,479	HK Housing Society
Bo Shek Mansion	寶石大廈	Flat-for-Sale/Rental	1996	3	667	HK Housing Society
Sheung Chui Court	尚翠苑	HOS	2017	3	962	

== Cheung Shan Estate ==
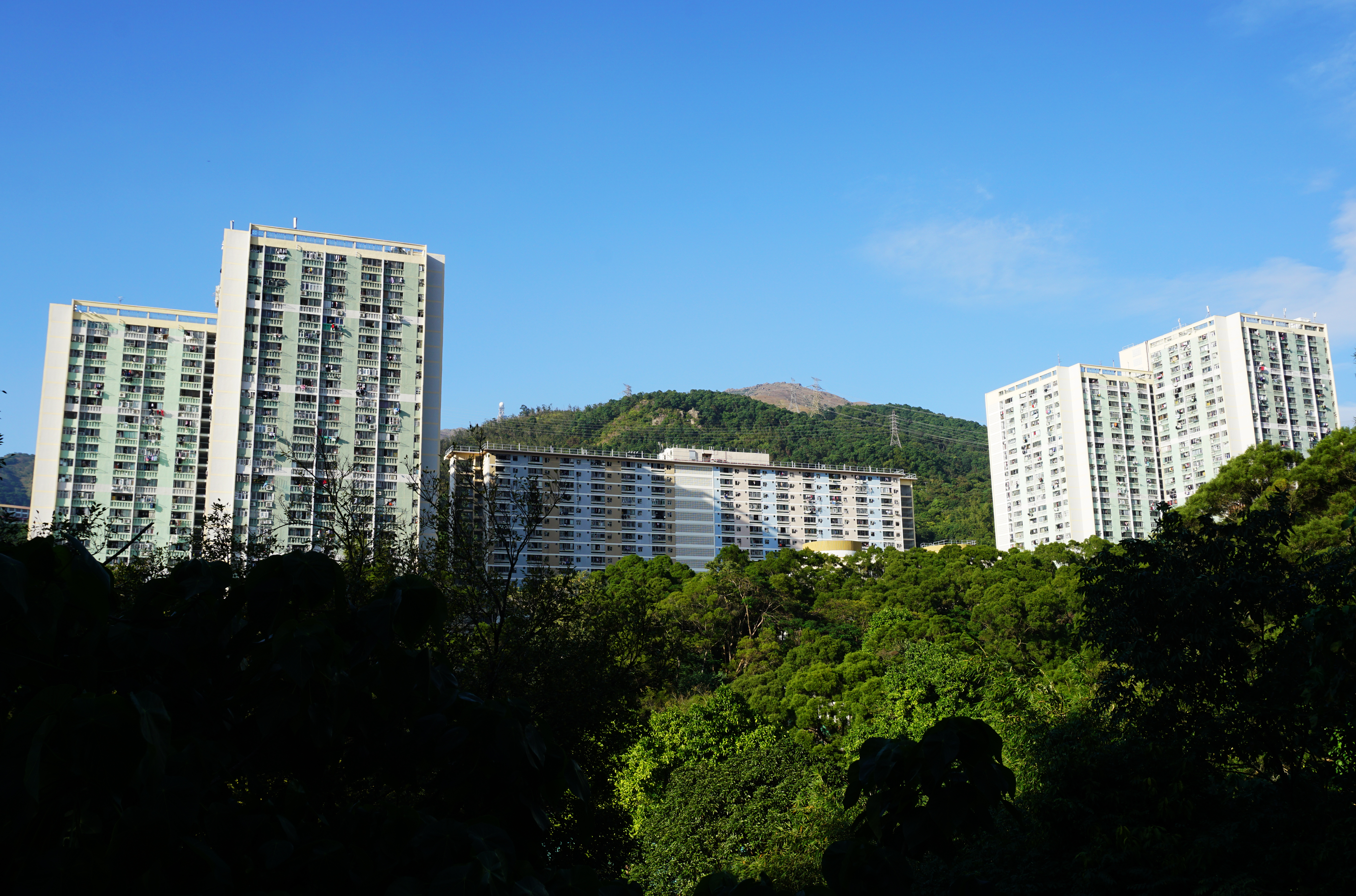
Cheung Shan Estate

Cheung Shan Estate (Chinese: 象山邨) is located between Shek Wai Kok Estate and Lei Muk Shue Estate, and near Shing Mun Tunnels. Formerly the site of Cheung Pei Shan Temporary Housing Area, it consists of 3 residential buildings and a shopping centre completed in 1978.

Name	Type	Completion
Lok Shan House	Twin Tower	1978
Sau Shan House	Twin Tower	1978
Tsui Shan House	Old Slab	1978

== Fuk Loi Estate ==
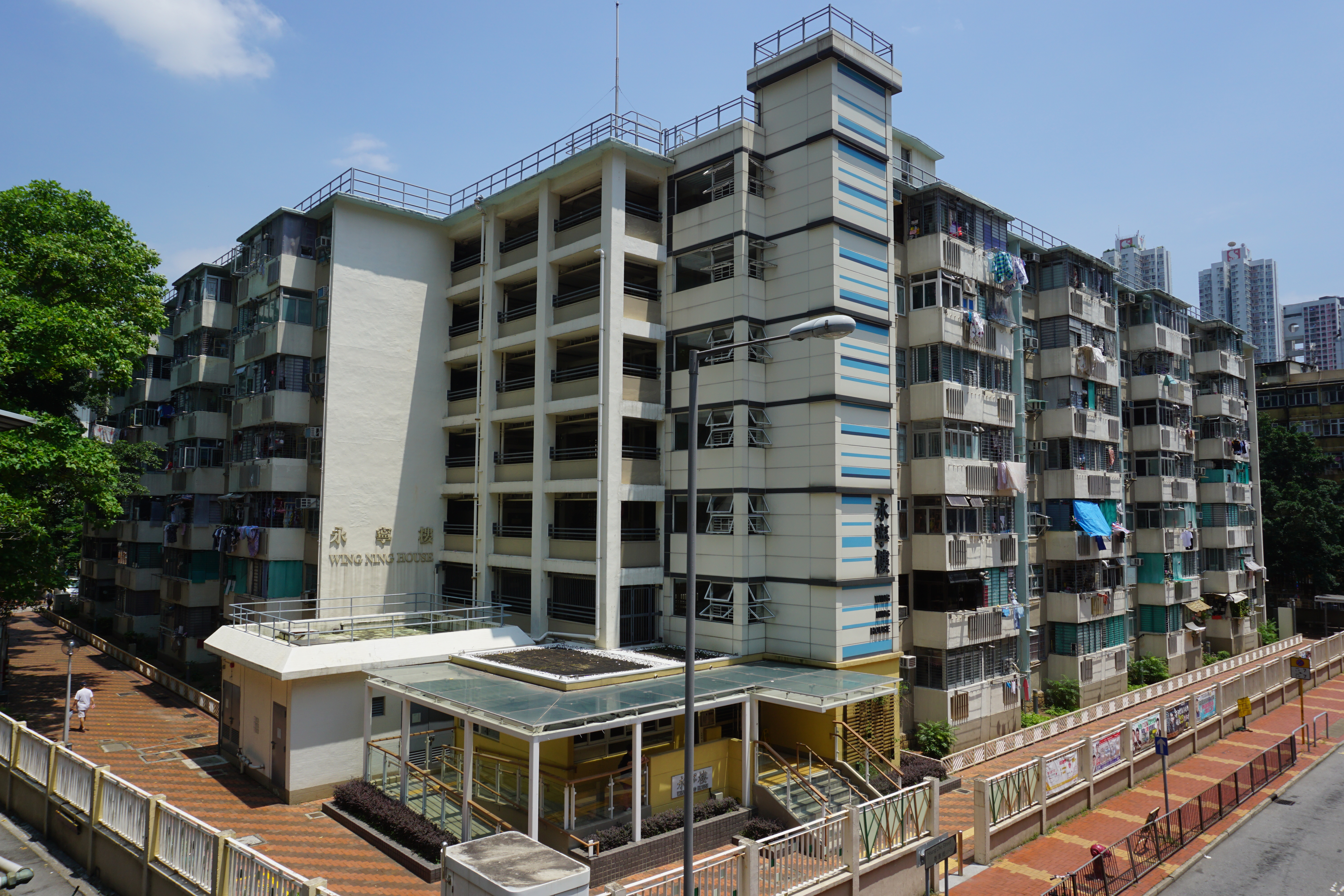
Wing Ning House, Fuk Loi Estate

Fuk Loi Estate (Chinese: 福來邨) is located at the reclaimed land along Castle Peak Road and opposite to Nan Fung Centre, Tsuen Kam Centre and Discovery Park. It has 9 residential buildings completed between 1963 and 1967, and it is the oldest existing public housing estate in Tsuen Wan District and Kwai Tsing District.

The original Tsuen Wan Public Library occupied the ground floor of Wing Hong House. It was the first public library in the New Territories.

Name	Type	Completion
Wing Ning House	Old Slab	1963
Wing Hing House	Old Slab	1963
Wing Ka House	Old Slab	1964
Wing Hong House	Old Slab	1964
Wing Cheung House	Old Slab	1964
Wing Ting House	Old Slab	1964
Wing Tai House	Old Slab	1964
Wing Lok House	Old Slab	1964
Wing Lung House	Old Slab	1967

== Lei Muk Shue Estate ==
Lei Muk Shue Estate (Chinese: 梨木樹邨) is the largest public housing estate in Tsuen Wan District consisting of 17 buildings, with the maximum population of 37,000. It was built in the 1970s. Although it is geographically located in the eastern part of Tsuen Wan as well as the northern part of Kwai Chung, it administratively belongs to Tsuen Wan District instead of Kwai Tsing District because it is at the west of Wo Yi Hop Road, the boundary between the two districts.

== Shek Wai Kok Estate ==
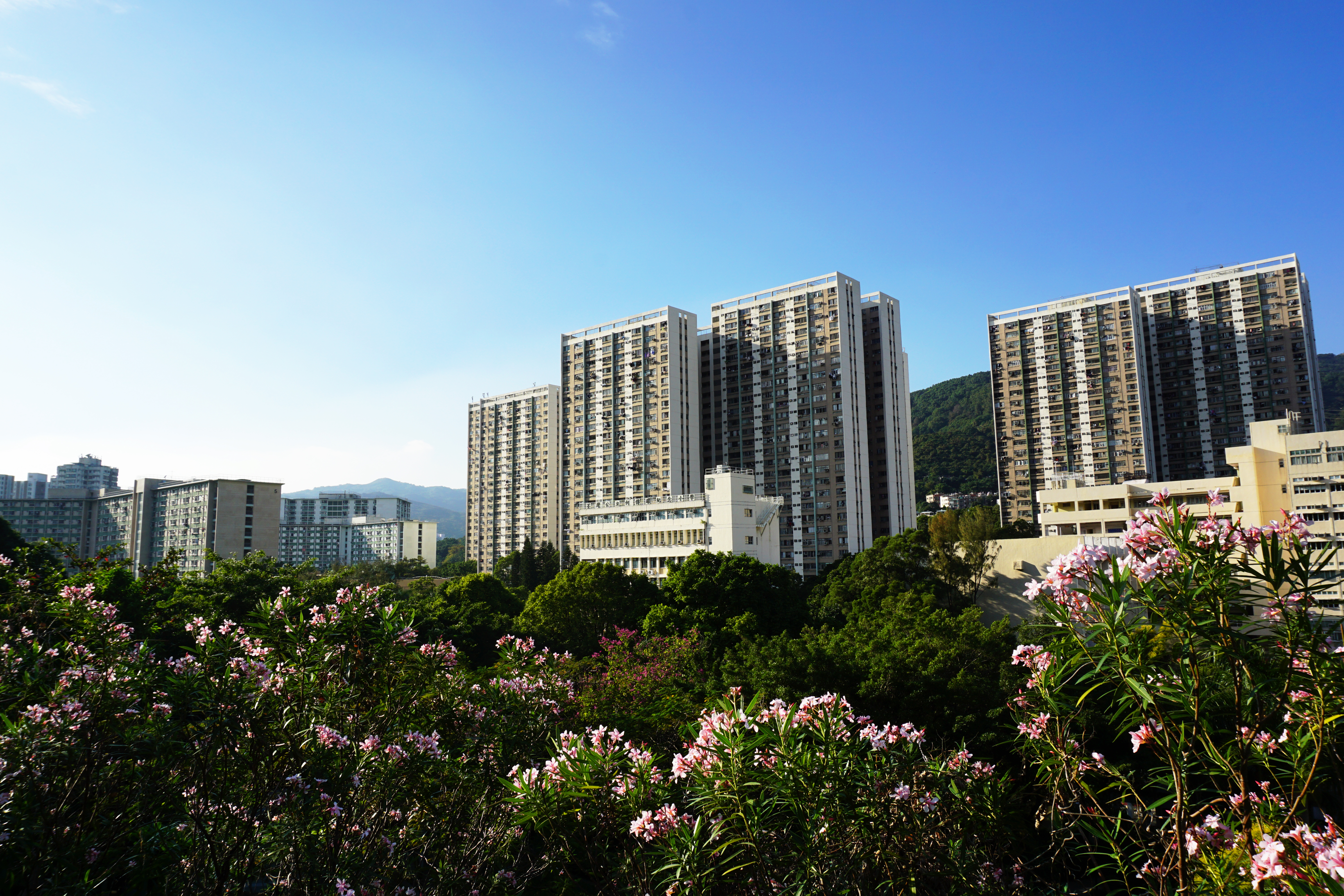
Shek Wai Kok Estate

Shek Wai Kok Estate (Chinese: 石圍角邨) is located in Shek Wai Kok, near Shing Mun Valley and Luk Yeung Sun Chuen. It consists of 8 residential buildings completed in 1980.

Name	Type	Completion
Shek Fong House	Old Slab	1980
Shek Ho House	Old Slab	1980
Shek Lin House	Old Slab	1980
Shek Kuk House	Double I	1980
Shek Lan House	Double H	1980
Shek To House	Double H	1980
Shek Tsui House	Double H	1980
Shek Kwai House	Double H	1980

== Bo Shek Mansion ==
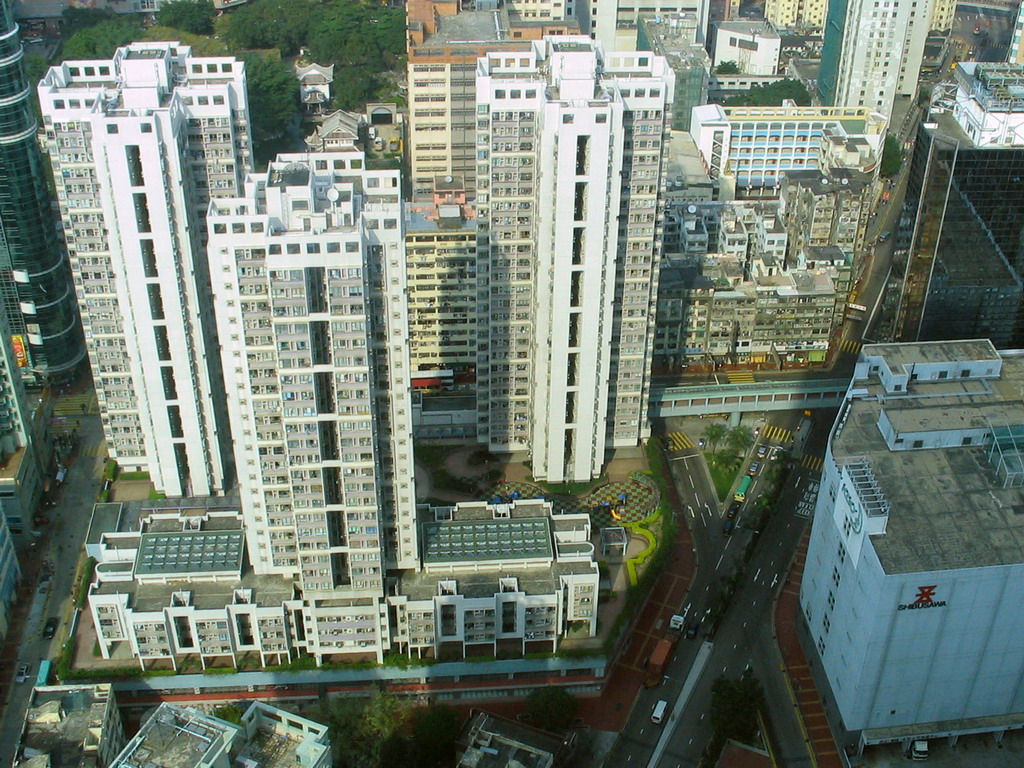
Bo Shek Mansion

Bo Shek Mansion (Chinese: 寶石大廈) is a Flat-for-Sale Scheme estate located at the reclaimed land in Sha Tsui Road. It now consists of 3 residential buildings, built in 1996 by Hong Kong Housing Society. It, in total, offers 268 units for rental use and 400 units for the Flat-for-Sale Scheme.

The estate was built in 1964 with in total 3 blocks. Its name in Chinese, literally "Precious Stones Estate" in English, was derived from the nearby Shek Pik San Tsuen (Chinese: 石碧新村; the character 石 means "stone"). The original estate was demolished in 1992, and 3 buildings, which stand today, were rebuilt at the site in 1996.

Prior to the redevelopment in 1996, the English name for the estate was "Bo Shek Dai Ha", completely transliterated from the Chinese pronunciation. However, it was renamed Bo Shek Mansion afterwards.

== Clague Garden Estate ==
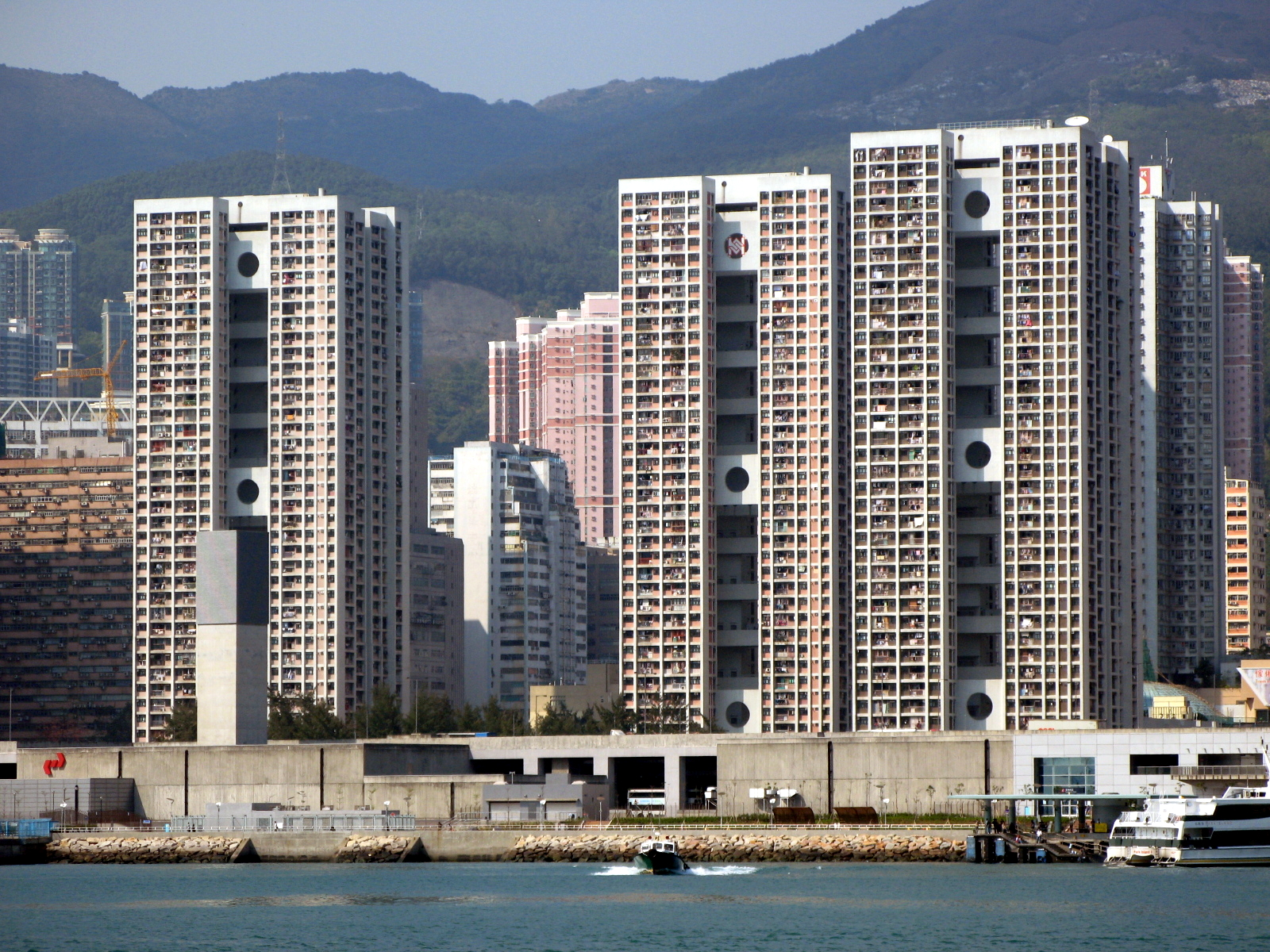
Clague Garden Estate

Clague Garden Estate (Chinese: 祈德尊新邨) is a Flat-for-Sale Scheme and public housing estate by Hong Kong Housing Society located on reclaimed land near Tsuen Wan Ferry Pier and MTR Tsuen Wan West station.

It consists of three residential buildings, built in 1989 by the Hong Kong Housing Society. It offers 552 flats for rent and 926 under the Flat-for-Sale Scheme. Many early residents were resettled from the Four Seasons Estate, a nearby public housing estate that was demolished in 1990.

The estate was named for Sir Douglas Clague, the ex-chairman of Hong Kong Housing Society and the former head of Hutchison International. It received a Certificate of Merit at the 1991 Hong Kong Institute of Architects Annual Awards.

== Moon Lok Dai Ha ==
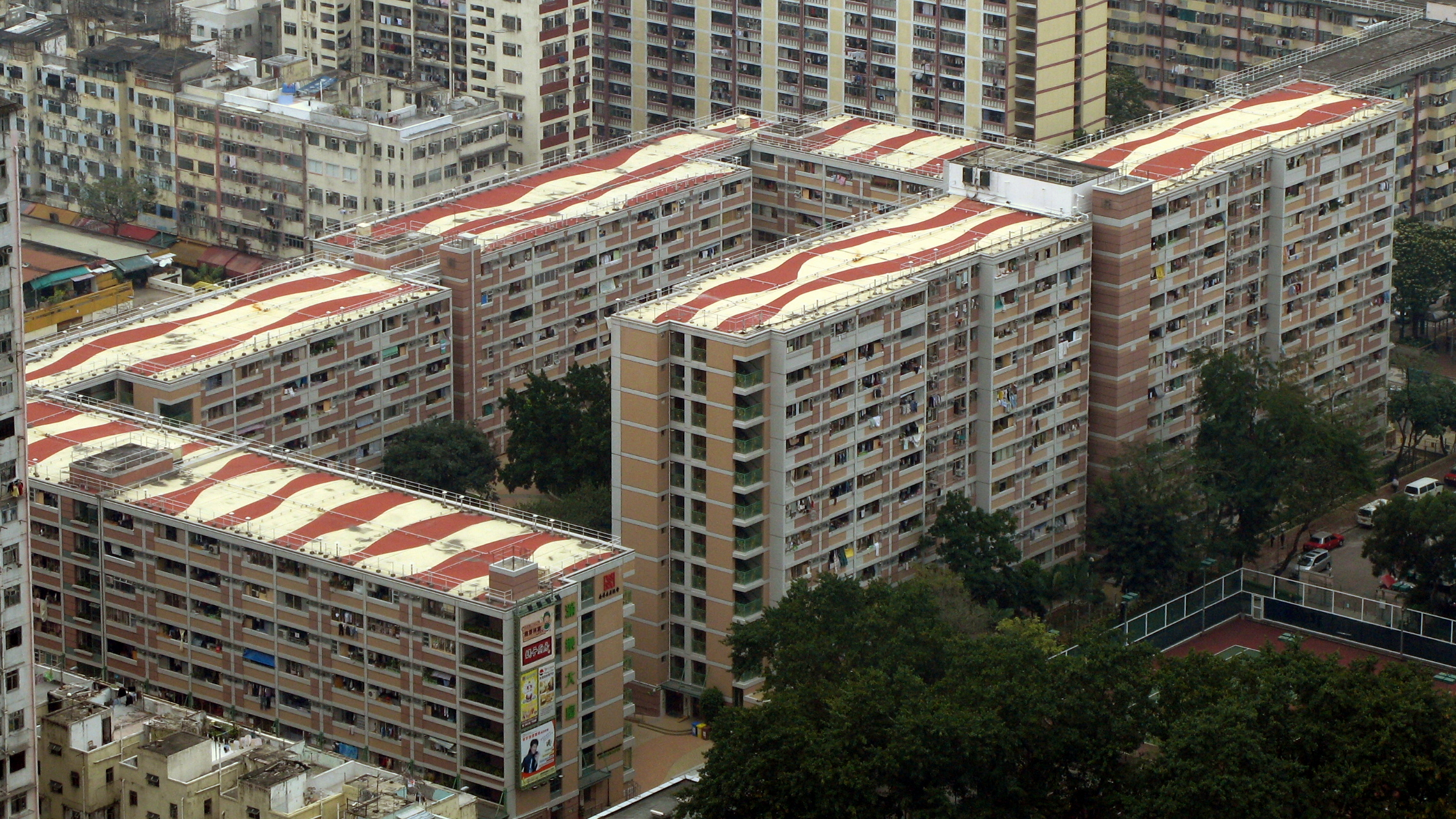
Moon Lok Dai Ha

Moon Lok Dai Ha (Chinese: 滿樂大廈) is located at the reclaimed land between Sha Tsui Road and Hoi Pa Street and near Fuk Loi Estate. It comprises 4 blocks of 11-storey buildings built in 1964 and 1965 by Hong Kong Housing Society, offering a total of 968 units. Its name, "Moon Lok Dai Ha", means "a building filled with happiness" in Cantonese. Rehabilitation works in the estate started in 2004 and finished in 2006.
