= Bo Shek Mansion =

Public housing estate in Tsuen Wan, Hong Kong

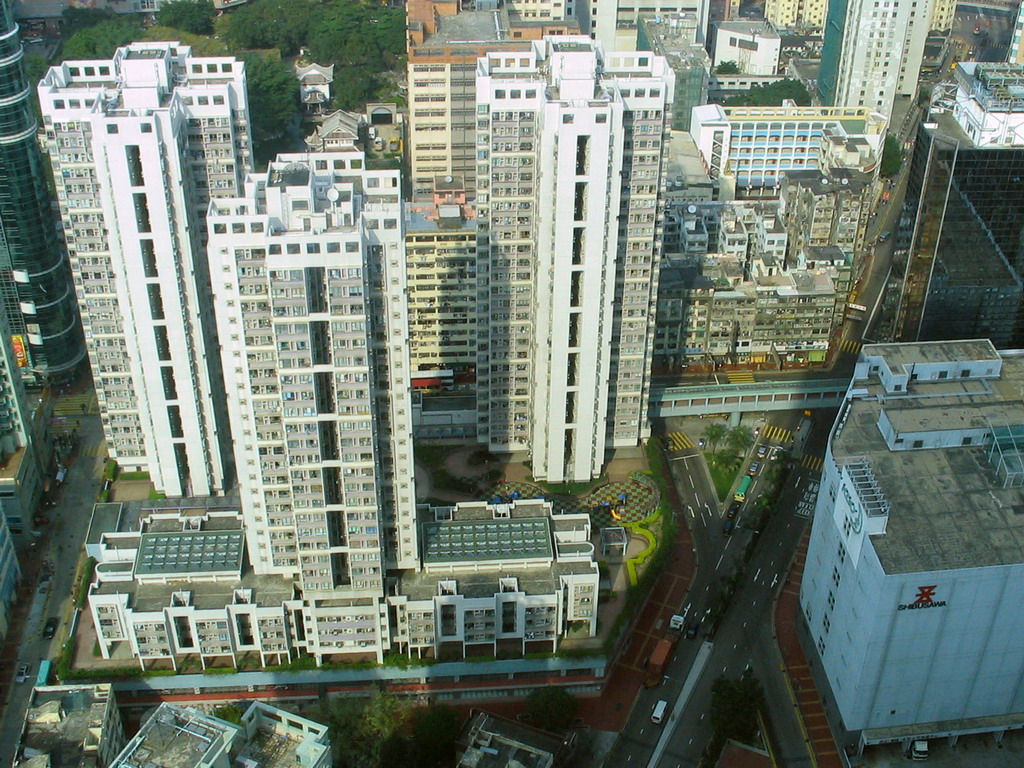
- Bo Shek Mansion
- Interactive map of Bo Shek Mansion

General information
- Location: 328 Sha Tsui Road, Tsuen Wan; New Territories, Hong Kong
- Coordinates: 22.3684897°N 114.1174728°E
- Status: Completed
- Category: Public rental housing
- No. of blocks: 3
- No. of units: 667

Construction
- Constructed: 1964; 62 years ago (before reconstruction); 1996; 30 years ago (after reconstruction)
- Authority: Hong Kong Housing Society

Bo Shek Mansion (Chinese: 寶石大廈) is a Flat-for-Sale Scheme public housing estate in Tsuen Wan, New Territories, Hong Kong located at the reclaimed land in Sha Tsui Road. It now consists of 3 residential buildings, built in 1996 by Hong Kong Housing Society. It, in total, offers 268 units for rental use and 400 units for the Flat-for-Sale Scheme. Its name in Chinese, literally "Precious Stones Estate" in English, was derived from the nearby Shek Pik San Tsuen (Chinese: 石碧新村; the character 石 means "stone"). The original estate was demolished in 1992, and 3 buildings, which stand today, were rebuilt at the site in 1996.

== Background ==
Prior to the redevelopment in 1996, the English name for the estate was "Bo Shek Dai Ha", completely transliterated from the Chinese pronunciation. However, it was renamed Bo Shek Mansion afterwards.

== Houses ==
Name	Chinese name	Completed
Block 1	第1座	1996
Block 2	第2座	1996
Block 3	第3座	1996

== Politics ==
Bo Shek Mansion is located in Yeung Uk Road constituency of the Tsuen Wan District Council. It is currently represented by Steven Lam Sek-tim, who was elected in the 2019 elections.

== See also ==
- Public housing estates in Tsuen Wan
