= Moon Lok Dai Ha =

Public housing estate in Tsuen Wan, Hong Kong

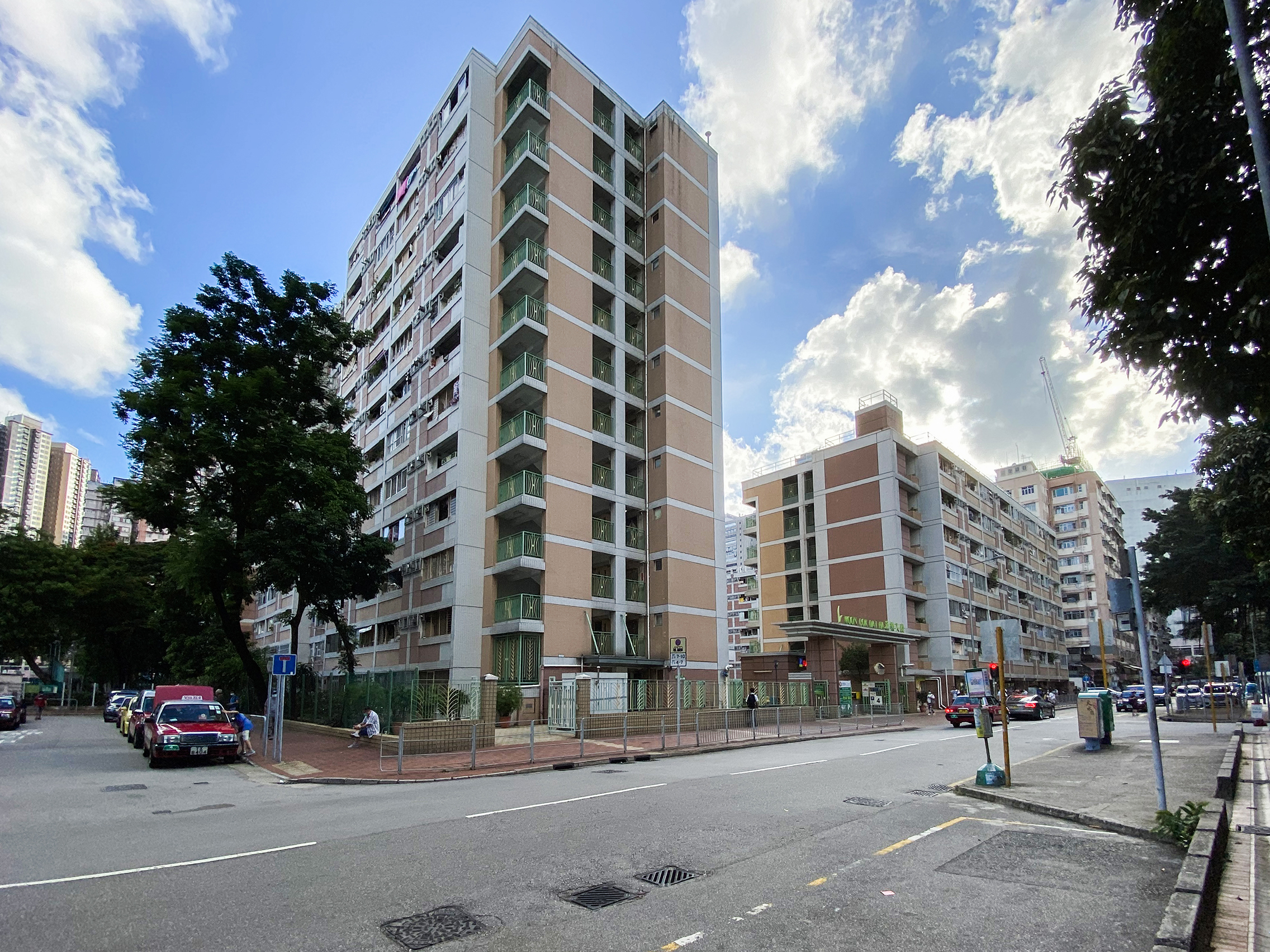
- Moon Lok Dai Ha
- Interactive map of Moon Lok Dai Ha

General information
- Location: 141-169 Sha Tsui Road; 50-54 Hoi Pa Street; 21 Tso Kung Street; Tsuen Wan; New Territories, Hong Kong
- Coordinates: 22.372900°N 114.112300°E
- Status: Completed
- Category: Public rental housing
- No. of blocks: 4
- No. of units: 947

Construction
- Constructed: 1964; 62 years ago
- Authority: Hong Kong Housing Society

Moon Lok Dai Ha (Chinese: 滿樂大廈) is a public housing estate in Tsuen Wan, New Territories, Hong Kong located at the reclaimed land between Sha Tsui Road and Hoi Pa Street and near Fuk Loi Estate. It comprises four blocks of 11-storey buildings built in 1964 and 1965 by Hong Kong Housing Society, offering a total of 968 units.

== Background ==
Its name, "Moon Lok Dai Ha", means "a building filled with happiness" in Cantonese. Rehabilitation works in the estate started in 2004 and finished in 2006.

== Houses ==
Name	Chinese name	Completed
Fook Chi Lau	福至樓	1964
Chung Sum Lau	從心樓	1964
Hong Lok Lau	康樂樓	1965
On Ning Lau	安寧樓	1965

== Politics ==
Moon Lok Dai Ha is located in Clague Garden constituency of the Tsuen Wan District Council. It was formerly represented by Chan Kim-kam, who was elected in the 2019 elections until July 2021.

== See also ==
- Public housing estates in Tsuen Wan
