= Tanner Hill Estate =

Rental housing estate in North Point, Hong Kong

Coordinates: 22.2900°N 114.2014°E

- Interactive map of Tanner Hill Estate

General information
- Status: Demolished
- Area: 9,810.57 m²
- No. of units: 590

Construction
- Constructed: 1961; 65 years ago

Other information
- Governing body: Hong Kong Housing Society

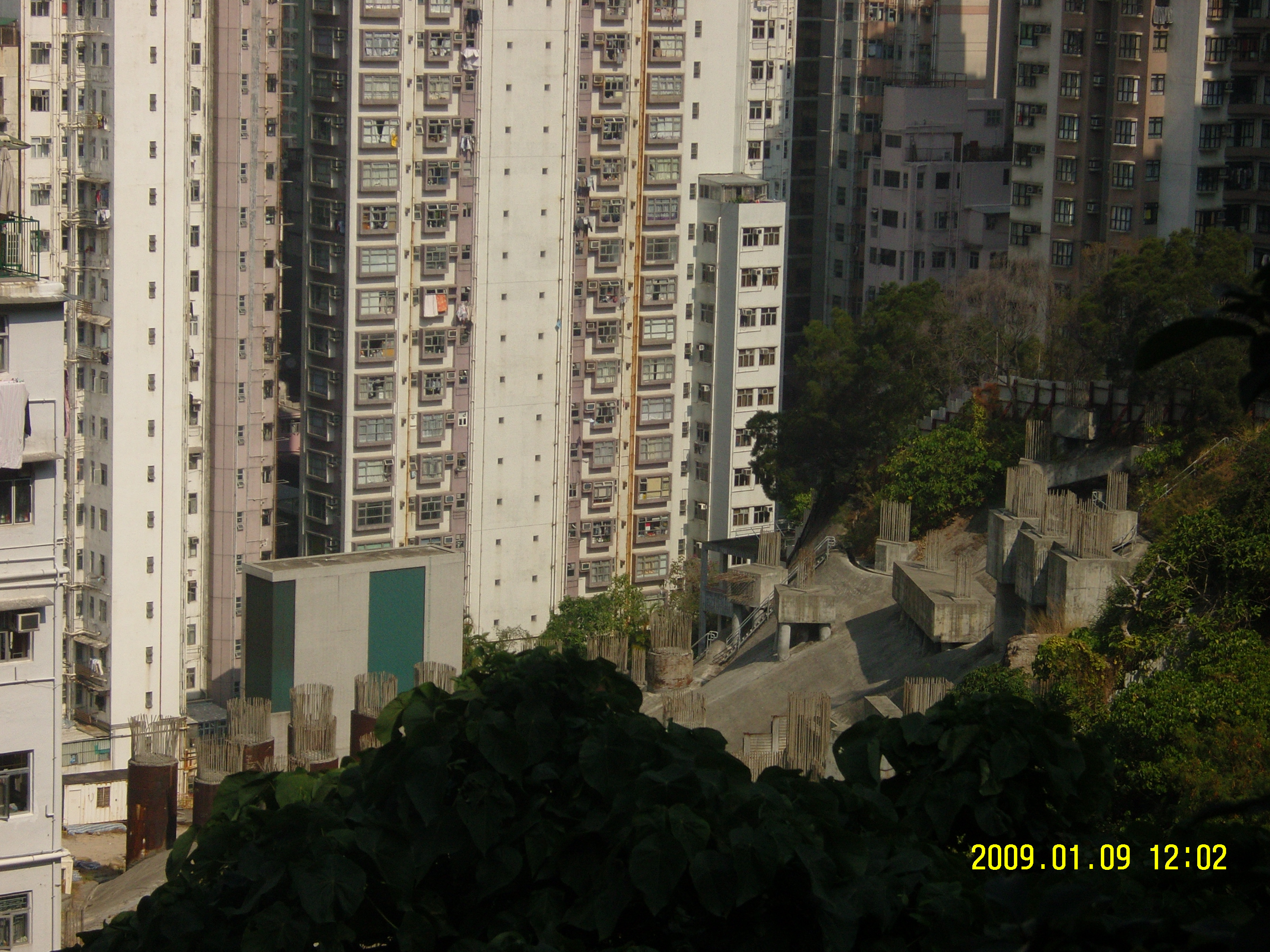
Former site of Tanner Hill Estate

Tanner Hill Estate (Chinese: 丹拿山邨) was a rental housing estate for low-income families on Tanner Road, North Point, Hong Kong, developed by the Hong Kong Housing Society.

== Background ==
The estate consisted of two blocks, Yellow Stork House and Pine Tree House, which were built in 1960 and 1961 respectively. It was originally called Shu Kuk Street Government Low Cost Housing Estate (書局街廉租屋宇), but it was later renamed to Tanner Hill Estate to avoid confusion with North Point Estate. In 1996, the Hong Kong Housing Society announced the redevelopment plan of Tanner Hill Estate.

Tanner Hill Estate was demolished in the nineties. Initially, the Hong Kong Housing Society planned to build housing for sale under the Home Ownership Scheme. However, the government temporarily called off the scheme in 2000 and the project was paused.

In 2008, the land lease was modified at market value land premium over HK$1,000,000,000 for the development of an elderly housing project. It comprises three 30-storey buildings with a total of 588 rental units of 500 to 1,000 square feet (46 to 93 m^{2}). In 2009, foundation work was started and the project was completed in December 2015. The flats are for lease only, seniors have to pay a lump sum between HK$4-16 million for an open lease that stands until their death based on the age of the senior and the floor space occupied. Around 380 applications were received, but as of July 2016 only 72 units were leased.
