= Cheung Shan Estate =

Public housing estate in Tsuen Wan, Hong Kong

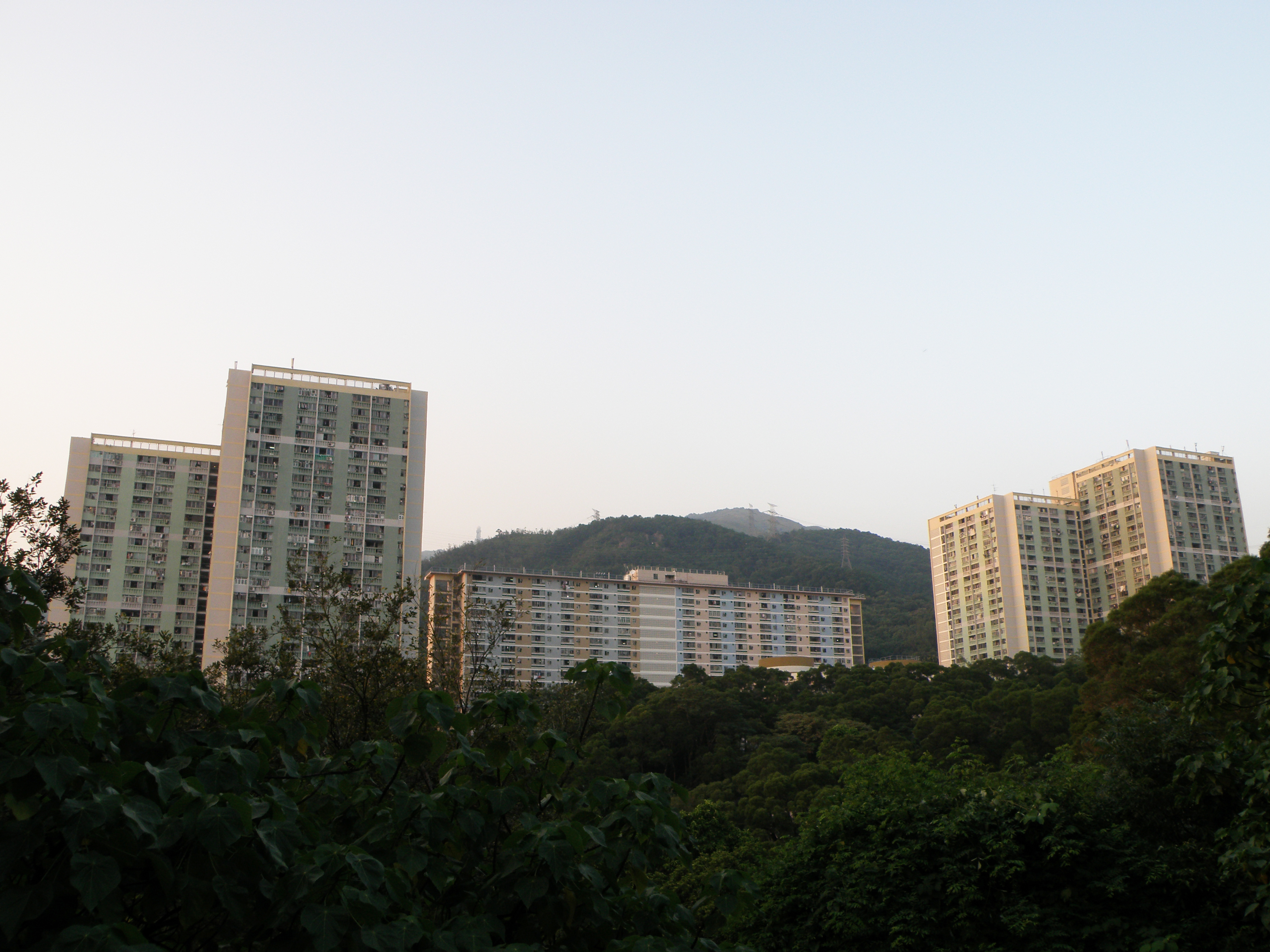
- Cheung Shan Estate
- Interactive map of Cheung Shan Estate

General information
- Location: 602 Cheung Shan Estate Road West, Tsuen Wan; New Territories, Hong Kong
- Coordinates: 22.37853°N 114.13003°E
- Status: Completed
- Category: Public rental housing
- Population: 4,746 (2016)
- No. of blocks: 3
- No. of units: 1,621

Construction
- Constructed: 1978; 48 years ago
- Authority: Hong Kong Housing Authority

Cheung Shan Estate (Chinese: 象山邨) is a public housing estate located between Shek Wai Kok Estate and Lei Muk Shue Estate, and near Shing Mun Valley Park and Shing Mun Tunnels in Tsuen Wan, New Territories, Hong Kong. Formerly the site of Cheung Pei Shan Temporary Housing Area, it consists of three residential buildings completed in 1978.

== Houses ==
Name	Chinese name	Building type	Completed
Lok Shan House	樂山樓	Twin Tower	1978
Sau Shan House	秀山樓	Twin Tower	1978
Tsui Shan House	翠山樓	Old Slab	1978

== Demographics ==
According to the 2016 by-census, Cheung Shan Estate had a population of 4,746. The median age was 48.6 and the majority of residents (95.1 per cent) were of Chinese ethnicity. The average household size was 3 people. The median monthly household income of all households (i.e. including both economically active and inactive households) was HK$21,500.

== Politics ==
Cheung Shan Estate is located in Cheung Shek constituency of the Tsuen Wan District Council. It was formerly represented by Matthew Lai Man-fai, who was elected in the 2019 elections until his resignation in July 2021.

== Education ==
Cheung Shan Estate is in Primary One Admission (POA) School Net 62, which includes schools in Tsuen Wan and areas nearby. The net includes multiple aided schools and one government school, Hoi Pa Street Government Primary School.

== See also ==
- Public housing estates in Tsuen Wan
- Cheung Pei Shan Road
