= Cheung Shek (constituency) =

Hong Kong constituency

- Elected constituency for the Tsuen Wan District Council
- Boundary of Cheung Shek in Tsuen Wan District
- District: Tsuen Wan
- Legislative Council constituency: New Territories South West
- Population: 13,060 (2019)
- Electorate: 7,712 (2019)

Current constituency
- Created: 2003
- Number of members: One
- Member: (Vacant)
- Created from: Cheung Shan

Cheung Shek, formerly called Cheung Shan, is one of the 17 constituencies in the Tsuen Wan District. The constituency returns one district councillor to the Tsuen Wan District Council, with an election every four years.

Cheung Shek constituency is loosely based on Cheung Shan Estate and part of the Shek Wai Kok Estate with estimated population of 13,351.

== Councillors represented ==
=== Cheung Shan (1994–2003) ===
Election	Member	Party
1994	Hui Chui-fai	UFSP
199?	Hui Chui-fai	DAB
1999	Choy Tsz-man	Democratic

=== Cheung Shek (2003 to present) ===
Election	Member	Party
2003	Choy Tsz-man	Democratic
2011	Jones Chan Chun-chung	DAB
2019	Matthew Lai Man-fai→Vacant	Democratic

== Election results ==
=== 2010s ===
Tsuen Wan District Council Election, 2019: Cheung Shek
Party	Candidate	Votes	%	±%
Democratic	Matthew Lai Man-fai	2,857	54.48	+43.48
DAB	Jones Chan Chun-chung	2,387	45.52	−16.58
Majority		470	8.96	
Turnout		5,269	68.38	
Democratic gain from DAB		Swing		

Tsuen Wan District Council Election, 2015: Cheung Shek
Party	Candidate	Votes	%	±%
DAB	Jones Chan Chun-chung	1,997	62.1	+13.1
Democratic Alliance	Aden Wong Chi-shun	864	26.9	
Democratic	Chan Ka-wing	353	11.0	–32.8
Majority		1,133	35.2	
Turnout		3,254	44.9	
DAB hold		Swing		

Tsuen Wan District Council Election, 2011: Cheung Shek
Party	Candidate	Votes	%	±%
DAB	Jones Chan Chun-chung	1,768	49.0	+3.7
Democratic	Choy Tsz-man	1,581	43.8	−5.6
People Power (The Frontier (2010-))	Aden Wong Chi-shun	257	7.1	
DAB gain from Democratic		Swing		

=== 2000s ===
Tsuen Wan District Council Election, 2007: Cheung Shek
Party	Candidate	Votes	%	±%
Democratic	Choy Tsz-man	1,565	49.0	−7.4
DAB	Jones Chan Chun-chung	1,463	45.3	+19.9
Independent	Hui Chui-fai	164	5.1	
Democratic hold		Swing		

Tsuen Wan District Council Election, 2003: Cheung Shek
Party	Candidate	Votes	%	±%
Democratic	Choy Tsz-man	1,749	56.4	+1.1
DAB	Jones Chan Chun-chung	1,350	43.6	+1.5
Democratic win (new seat)				

=== 1990s ===
Tsuen Wan District Council Election, 1999: Cheung Shan
Party	Candidate	Votes	%	±%
Democratic	Choy Tsz-man	1,847	57.5	+12.6
DAB	Hui Chui-fai	1,350	42.1	−12.4
DAB gain from Democratic		Swing		

Tsuen Wan District Board Election, 1994: Cheung Shan
Party	Candidate	Votes	%	±%
Democratic	Choy Tsz-man	1,295	44.9	
UFSP	Hui Chui-fai	1,569	54.5	
UFSP win (new seat)				
