= Joyous Living senior housing project =

Joyous Living senior housing project (Chinese: 雋逸生活) is a scheme being planned and developed by the non-governmental and nonprofit Hong Kong Housing Society, the second largest public housing provider in Hong Kong. The project is targeting wealthy retired individuals, and fills up market gap for one-stop worry free retirement living for the middle class but has attracted criticism for its high price.

Two senior housing sites are located in Hong Kong: Tanner Hill Project and Wetland Park Road Project, which will provide around 1,600 non-subsidized independent living for middle class seniors in Hong Kong. Both sites will provide homes of 500 to 1,300 square feet for long-term lease, not for sale.

== Tanner Hill Project ==
The Tanner Hill Project will be located in North Point, on the site of the former Tanner Hill Estate of the Hong Kong Housing Society, that was demolished in 2000. The Project will yield 588 flats by early 2015.

== Wetland Park Road Project ==
The Wetland Park Road Project, located near the Wetland Park in the northwestern New Territories will deliver 1,000 flats. Moved in date would be announced later.
