= Tsuen Wan Public Library =

Public library in Tsuen Wan, Hong Kong

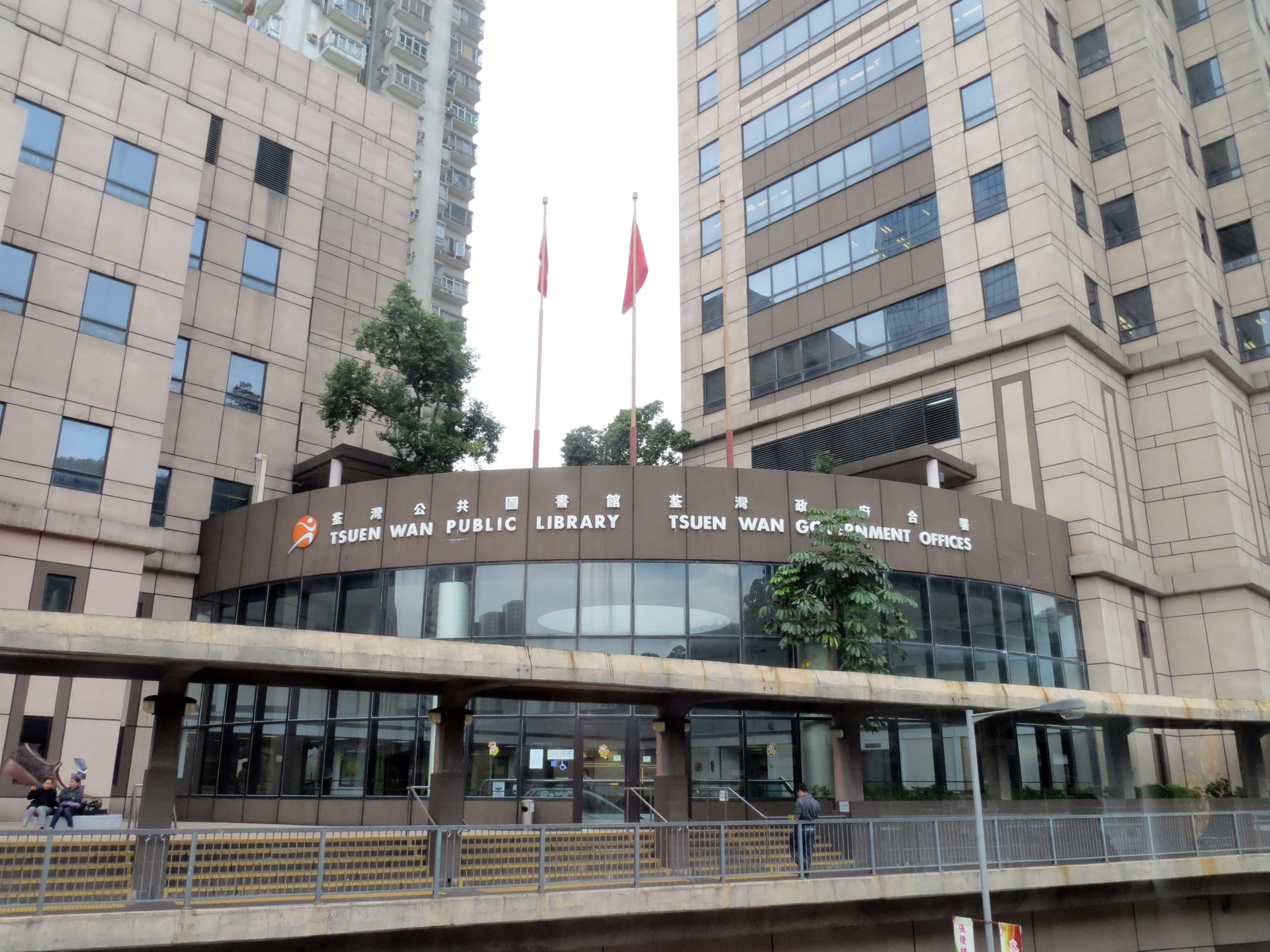
- 22.3742°N 114.1155°E
- Location: 38 Sai Lau Kok Road; Tsuen Wan, N.T.
- Type: Public library
- Established: 23 July 1993; 32 years ago
- Branch of: Hong Kong Public Libraries
- Public transit access: Tsuen Wan station

Tsuen Wan Public Library (Chinese: 荃灣公共圖書館) is located in Tsuen Wan, New Territories, Hong Kong. Opened in 1993, it is one of the major libraries of the Hong Kong Public Libraries system.

== History ==
The original Tsuen Wan Public Library occupied the ground floor of Wing Hong House, Fuk Loi Estate, around 200 metres from the current library. This was the first public library in the New Territories. At the time, the Tsuen Wan and Kwai Chung area was growing rapidly under Hong Kong's new town development programme.

The current Tsuen Wan Public Library is part of a building complex that also includes the Tsuen Wan Government Offices. The HK$258-million contract to construct the complex was jointly signed by the Architectural Services Department and the contractor on 22 June 1990. The library was planned and managed by the public libraries service of the former Regional Council, and was the largest public library in Hong Kong when it opened. Originally known as the Tsuen Wan Central Library, the new facility was formally inaugurated on 23 July 1993 by Governor Chris Patten, who gave a speech calling libraries "one of the most important community services".

In 1997, the Tsuen Wan Central Library and Sha Tin Central Library were cited as the two most heavily patronised public libraries in the territory.

In 2000, management of the library was taken over by the newly formed Leisure and Cultural Services Department (LCSD) after the Regional Council was disbanded.

== Description ==
The library occupies three floors of the Low Block of the Tsuen Wan Government Offices. It has a total floor area of around 3,000 square metres (32,000 sq ft).

The library includes an adult library, children's library, reference library, multimedia library, newspapers and periodicals section, computer and information centre, students' study room, and extension activities room. In addition, it is home to two special collections: one on the history and culture of Tsuen Wan District, and another called the "Modern Living Collection" which includes resources on home design, domestic maintenance, and related subjects.

== Expansion ==
The government is planning to renovate and expand the library. The proposal, estimated to cost HK$143.8 million, involves a renovation of the existing three library floors (3/F, 4/F, and 5/F) as well as the extension of the library into the 6/F and 7/F of the building. The latter floors are currently used as office and supporting space and are not open to the public. The Home Affairs Bureau sought the support of the Legislative Council for the project in 2021.

== Gallery ==
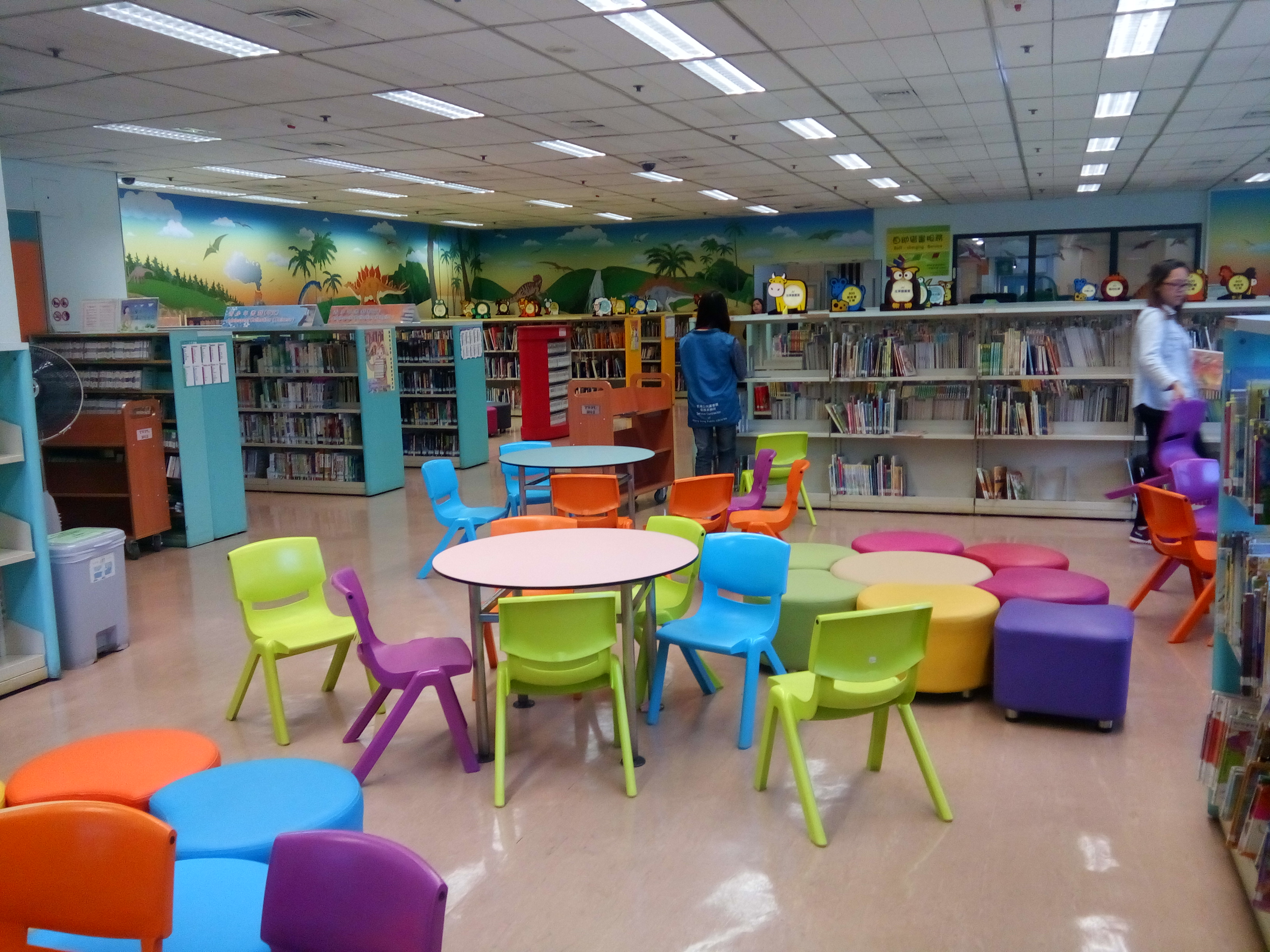
Children's library

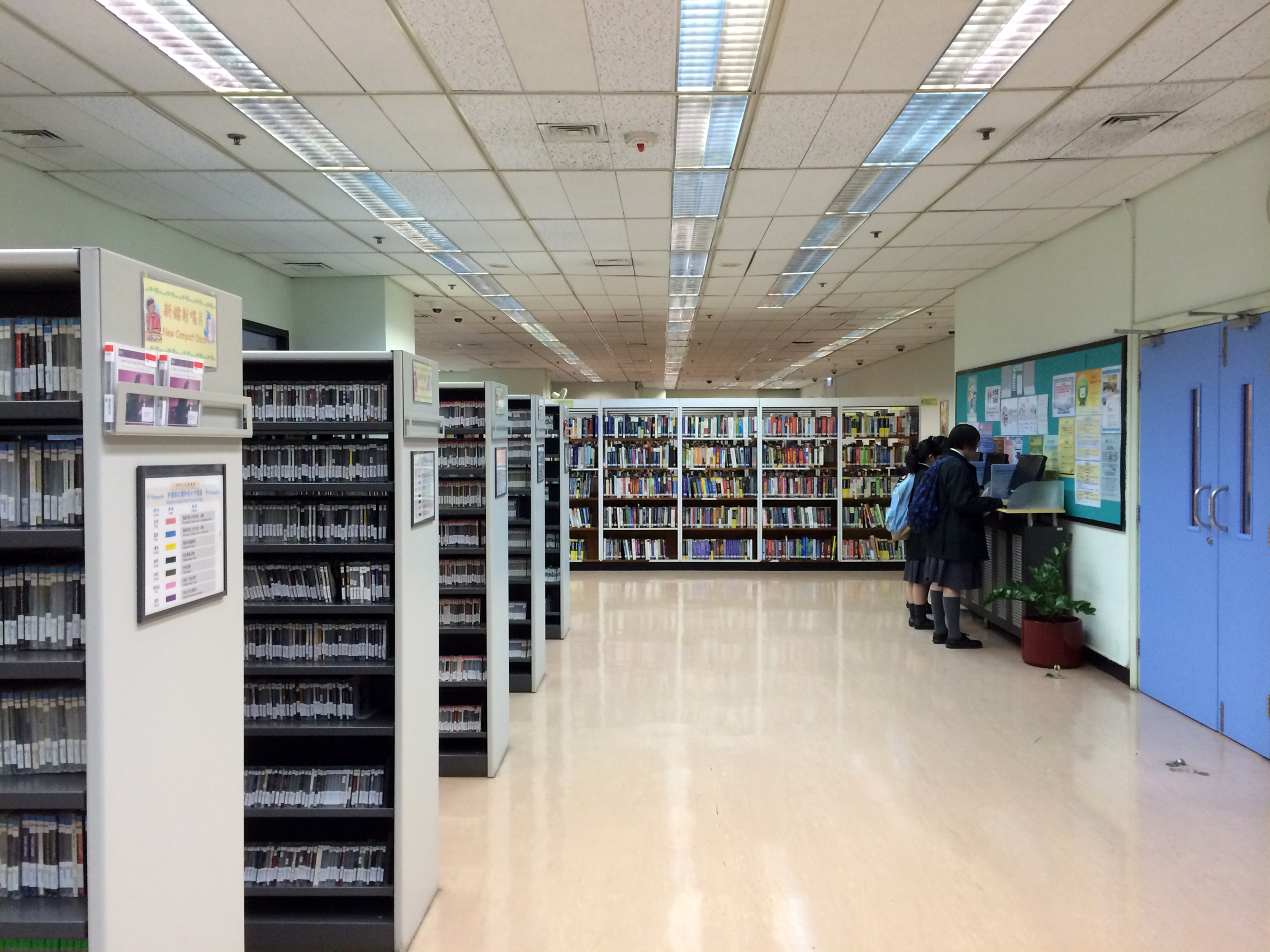
Multimedia section

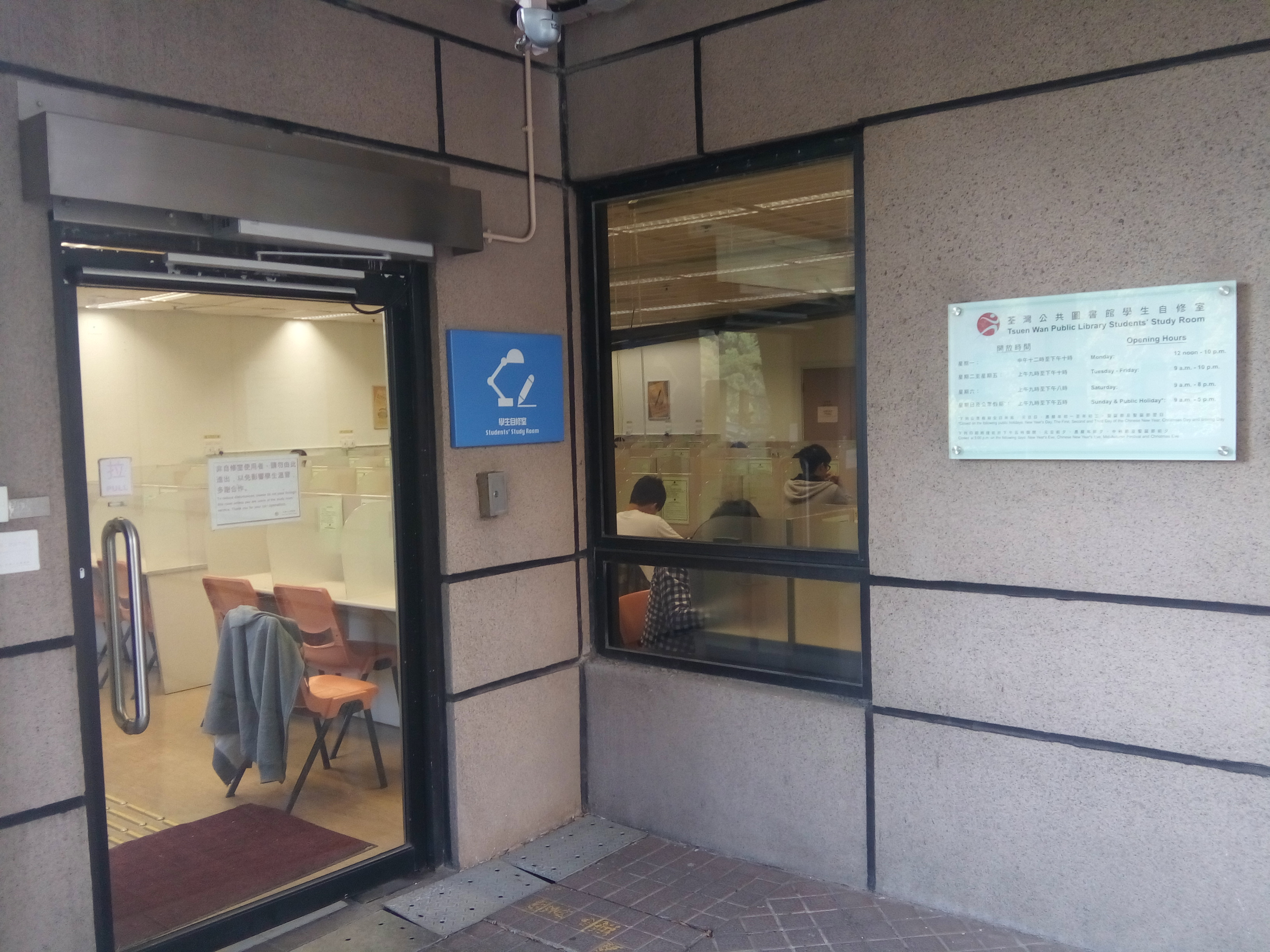
Entrance of students' study room
