= Fuk Loi (constituency) =

Constituency in Tsuen Wan District, Hong Kong

- Elected constituency for the Tsuen Wan District Council
- Boundary of Fuk Loi in Tsuen Wan District
- District: Tsuen Wan
- Legislative Council constituency: New Territories South West
- Population: 13,916 (2019)
- Electorate: 7,889 (2019)

Current constituency
- Created: 1991
- Number of members: One
- Member: Kot Siu-yuen (FTU)

Fuk Loi is one of the 17 constituencies in the Tsuen Wan District.

The constituency returns one district councillor to the Tsuen Wan District Council, with an election every four years. The seat has been currently held by Kot Siu-yuen of the Hong Kong Federation of Trade Unions.

Fuk Loi constituency is loosely based on most part of the Fuk Loi Estate in Tsuen Wan with estimated population of 13,916.

== Councillors represented ==
=== 1991–94 ===
Election	Member	Party	Member	Party
1991	Albert Chan Wai-yip	United Democrat	Fung Chau-kam	United Democrat
1994	Albert Chan Wai-yip	Democratic	Fung Chau-kam	Democratic

=== 1994 to present ===
Election	Member	Party
1994	Albert Chan Wai-yip	Democratic
1999	Chiu Ka-po	Democratic
2011 by-election	Kot Siu-yuen	FTU

== Election results ==
=== 2010s ===
Tsuen Wan District Council Election, 2019: Fuk Loi
Party	Candidate	Votes	%	±%
FTU	Kot Siu-yuen	2,871	52.70	
Democratic	Wong Charm-luen	2,351	43.15	
Independent	Victoria Ng Ka-yee	226	4.15	
Majority		520	9.55	
Turnout		5,460	69.29	
FTU hold		Swing		

Tsuen Wan District Council Election, 2015: Fuk Loi
Party	Candidate	Votes	%	±%
FTU	Kot Siu-yuen	Uncontested		
FTU hold		Swing		

Tsuen Wan District Council Election, 2011: Fuk Loi
Party	Candidate	Votes	%	±%
FTU	Kot Siu-yuen	2,511	74.3	+6.8
Democratic	Mui Yee-ling	869	25.7	−6.8
FTU hold		Swing		

Fuk Loi By-election 2011
Party	Candidate	Votes	%	±%
FTU	Kot Siu-yuen	2,086	67.5	+22.7
Democratic	Mui Yee-ling	1,006	32.5	−22.7
FTU gain from Democratic		Swing		

=== 2000s ===
Tsuen Wan District Council Election, 2007: Fuk Loi
Party	Candidate	Votes	%	±%
Democratic	Chiu Ka-po	1,777	55.2	−11.5
FTU	Shum Cheuk-lam	1,444	44.8	
Democratic hold		Swing		

Tsuen Wan District Council Election, 2003: Fuk Loi
Party	Candidate	Votes	%	±%
Democratic	Chiu Ka-po	2,182	66.7	+7.6
DAB	Luk Wai-sing	1,088	33.3	+0.7
Democratic hold		Swing		

=== 1990s ===
Tsuen Wan District Council Election, 1999: Fuk Loi
Party	Candidate	Votes	%	±%
Democratic	Chiu Ka-po	1,680	59.1	−7.3
DAB	Luk Wai-sing	927	32.6	
Independent	Lok Cheong-hon	223	7.8	
Democratic hold		Swing		

Tsuen Wan District Board Election, 1994: Fuk Loi
Party	Candidate	Votes	%	±%
Democratic	Albert Chan Wai-yip	1,779	66.4	−9.4
Independent	Muk Shun-fu	870	32.5	
Democratic hold		Swing		

Tsuen Wan District Board Election, 1991: Fuk Loi
Party	Candidate	Votes	%	±%
United Democrats	Albert Chan Wai-yip	4,487	76.0	
United Democrats	Fung Chau-kam	2,844	48.2	
Independent	Cheung Chung-yan	2,707	45.9	
United Democrats win (new seat)				
United Democrats win (new seat)				
