= Flat-for-Sale Scheme =

- Traditional Chinese: 住宅發售計劃
- Simplified Chinese: 住宅发售计划
Transcriptions
Standard Mandarin
- Hanyu Pinyin: Zhùzhái Fāshòu Jìhuà
Yue: Cantonese
- Yale Romanization: Jyuh jaahk faat sauh gai waahk
- Jyutping: Zyu6 zaak6 faat3 sau6 gai3 waak6

Flat-for-Sale Scheme is a housing development scheme by Hong Kong Housing Society in the 1980s. The flats under the scheme are for sale at a concessionary price. It is similar to Home Ownership Scheme by Hong Kong Housing Authority.

The first estate was the Clague Garden Estate.

== See also ==
- Hong Kong Housing Society
