= Fuk Loi Estate =

Public housing estate in Tsuen Wan, Hong Kong

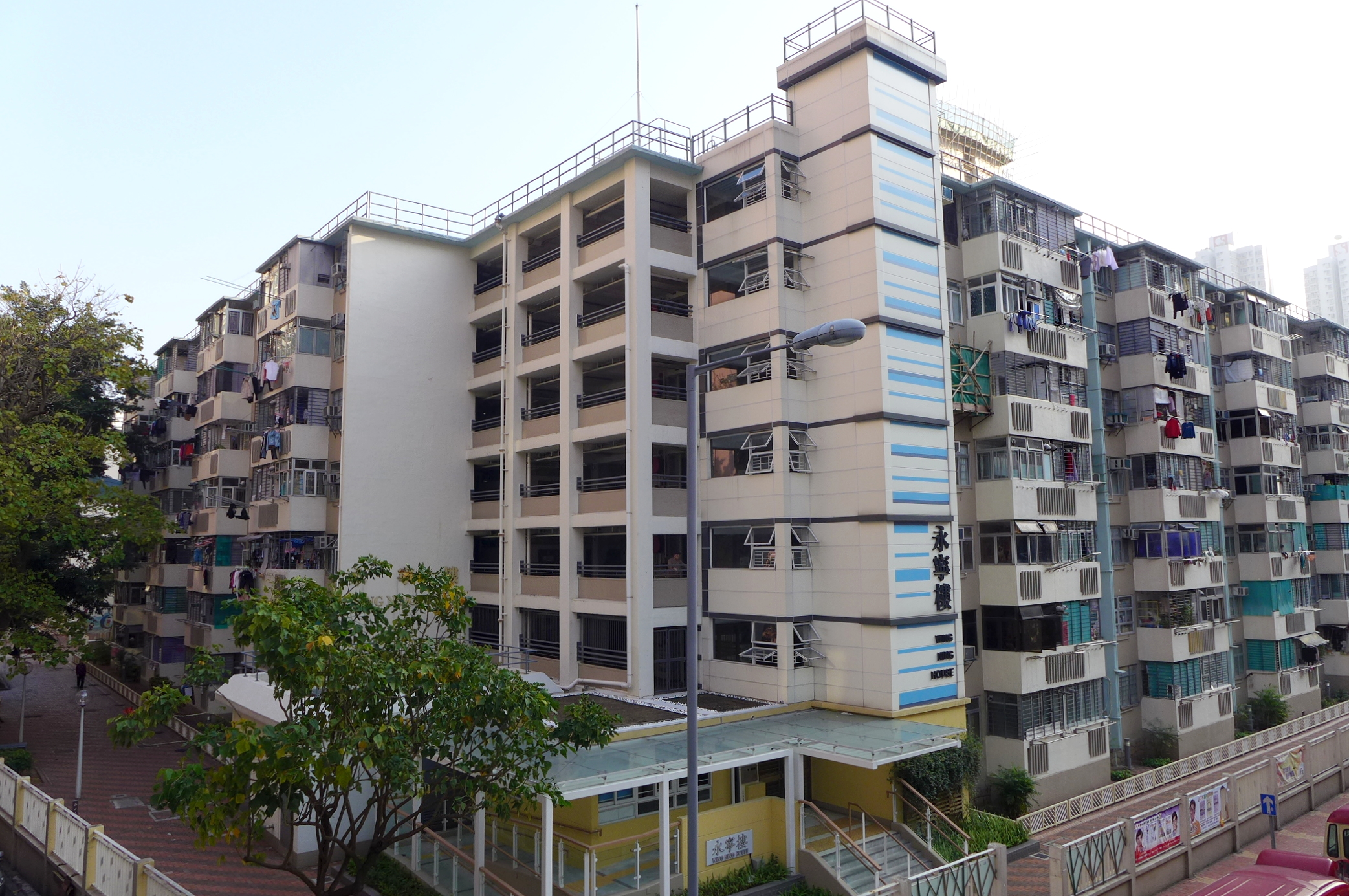
- Fuk Loi Estate
- Interactive map of Fuk Loi Estate

General information
- Location: 55 Hoi Pa Street, Tsuen Wan; New Territories, Hong Kong
- Coordinates: 22.37381°N 114.11332°E
- Status: Completed
- Category: Public rental housing
- Population: 6,999 (2016)
- No. of blocks: 9
- No. of units: 3,100

Construction
- Constructed: 1963; 63 years ago
- Authority: Hong Kong Housing Authority

Fuk Loi Estate (Chinese: 福來邨) is a public housing estate in Tsuen Wan, New Territories, Hong Kong, located at the reclaimed land along Castle Peak Road and opposite to Nan Fung Centre, Tsuen Kam Centre and Discovery Park. It has 9 residential buildings completed between 1963 and 1967, and it is the oldest existing public housing estate in Tsuen Wan District.

The original Tsuen Wan Public Library occupied the ground floor of Wing Hong House. It was the first public library in the New Territories.

== History ==
In the 1960s, the Hong Kong Government had decided to allocate a reclaimed land in Tsuen Wan to the Housing Authority for low-rent housing.

The estate originally had eight houses, which were four seven-storey houses and four sixteen-storey Old Slab houses. In 1965, the Housing Authority introduced an "industrialized" building plan from Japan and constructed it in the form of precast concrete. In order to test the practicability of this construction method, the Housing Authority had built a seven-storey house in the second phase of Fuk Loi Estate - Wing Lung House, which was completed in 1967.

When Fuk Loi Estate was occupied, all seven-storey buildings had no lifts. The Housing Authority later installed lifts for all seven-storey buildings from 2010 to 2012. The contract was awarded in 2011 and completed in 2012.

== Houses ==
Name	Chinese name	Phase	Building type	Completed
Wing Ning House	永寧樓	Phase I	Old Slab	1963
Wing Hing House	永興樓	Phase I	Old Slab	1963
Wing Ka House	永嘉樓	Phase I	Old Slab	1964
Wing Hong House	永康樓	Phase I	Old Slab	1964
Wing Cheung House	永昌樓	Phase II	Old Slab	1964
Wing Ting House	永定樓	Phase II	Old Slab	1964
Wing Tai House	永泰樓	Phase II	Old Slab	1964
Wing Lok House	永樂樓	Phase II	Old Slab	1964
Wing Lung House	永隆樓	Phase II	Old Slab	1967

== Demographics ==
According to the 2016 by-census, Fuk Loi Estate had a population of 6,999. The median age was 54.1 and the majority of residents (96.6 per cent) were of Chinese ethnicity. The average household size was 2.3 people. The median monthly household income of all households (i.e. including both economically active and inactive households) was HK$17,840.

== Politics ==
Fuk Loi Estate is located in Fuk Loi constituency of the Tsuen Wan District Council. It is currently represented by Kot Siu-yuen, who was elected in the 2019 elections.

== See also ==
- Public housing estates in Tsuen Wan
