= Lei Muk Shue Estate =

Public housing estate in Tsuen Wan, Hong Kong

Coordinates: 22.3785°N 114.1352°E

- Chinese: 梨木樹邨
- Cantonese Yale: lèih muhk syuh chyūn
Transcriptions
Yue: Cantonese
- Yale Romanization: lèih muhk syuh chyūn
- Jyutping: lei4 muk6 syu6 cyun1

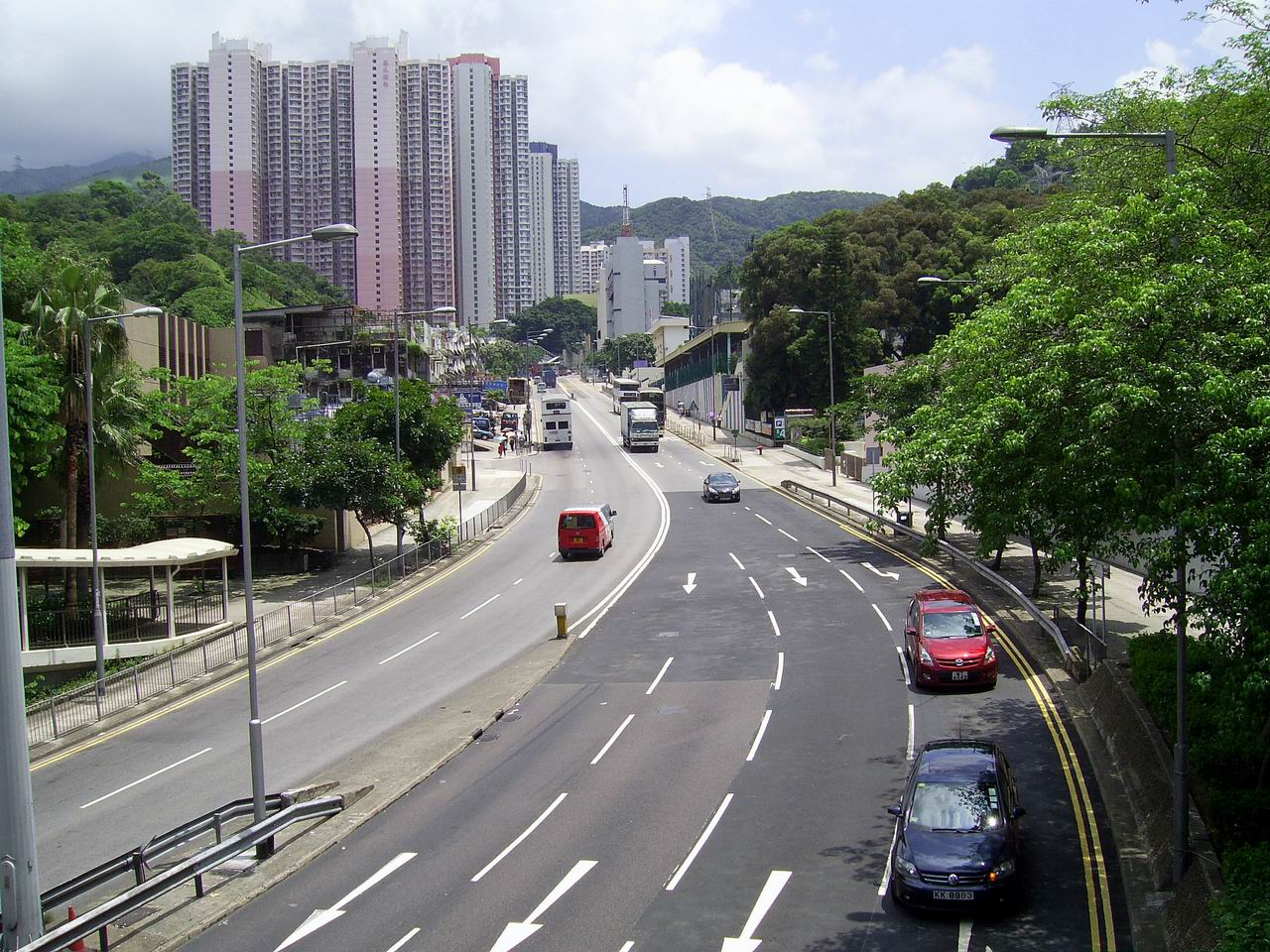
Lei Muk Shue (I) Estate (left-top corner)

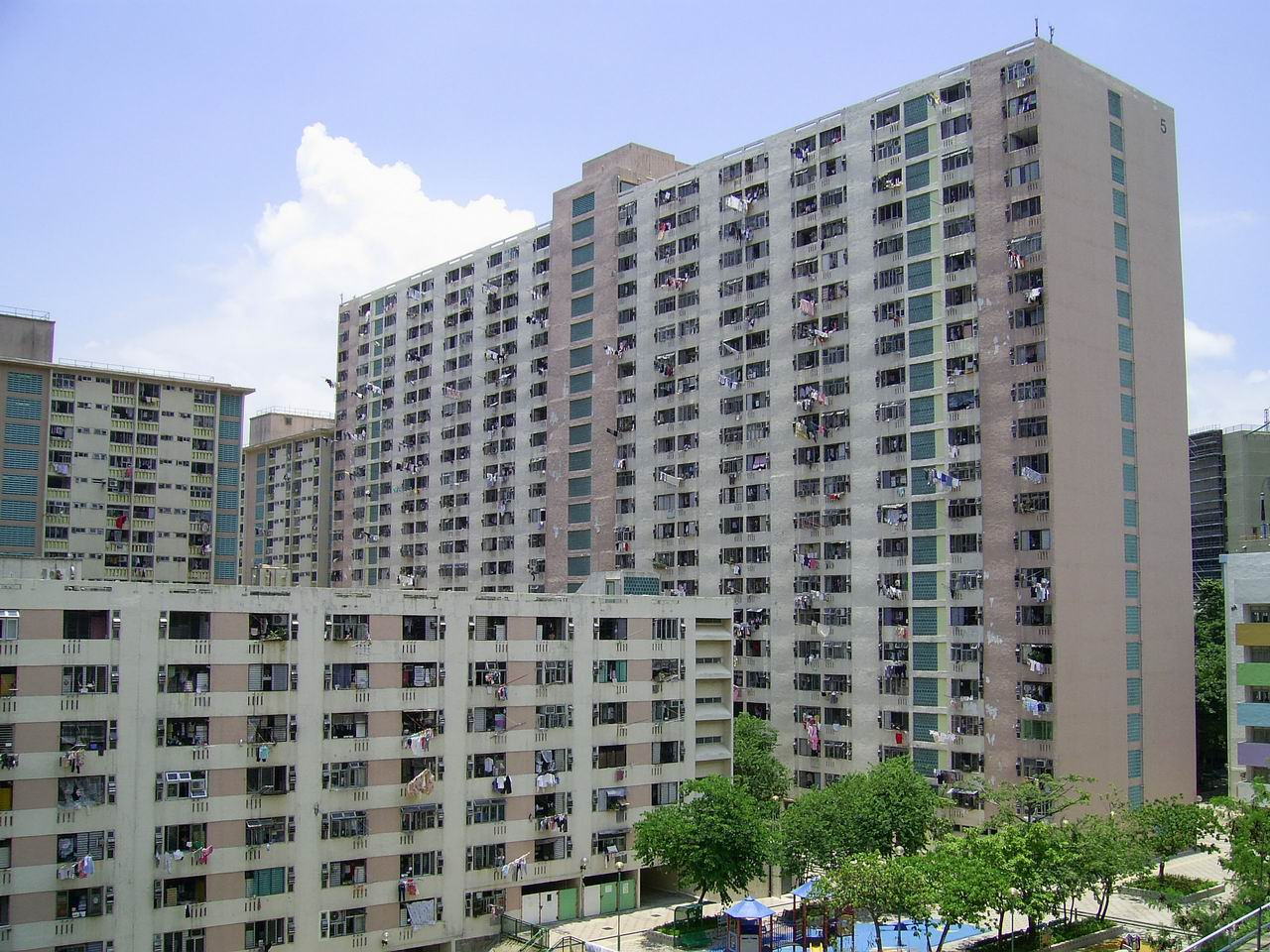
Lei Muk Shue (II) Estate

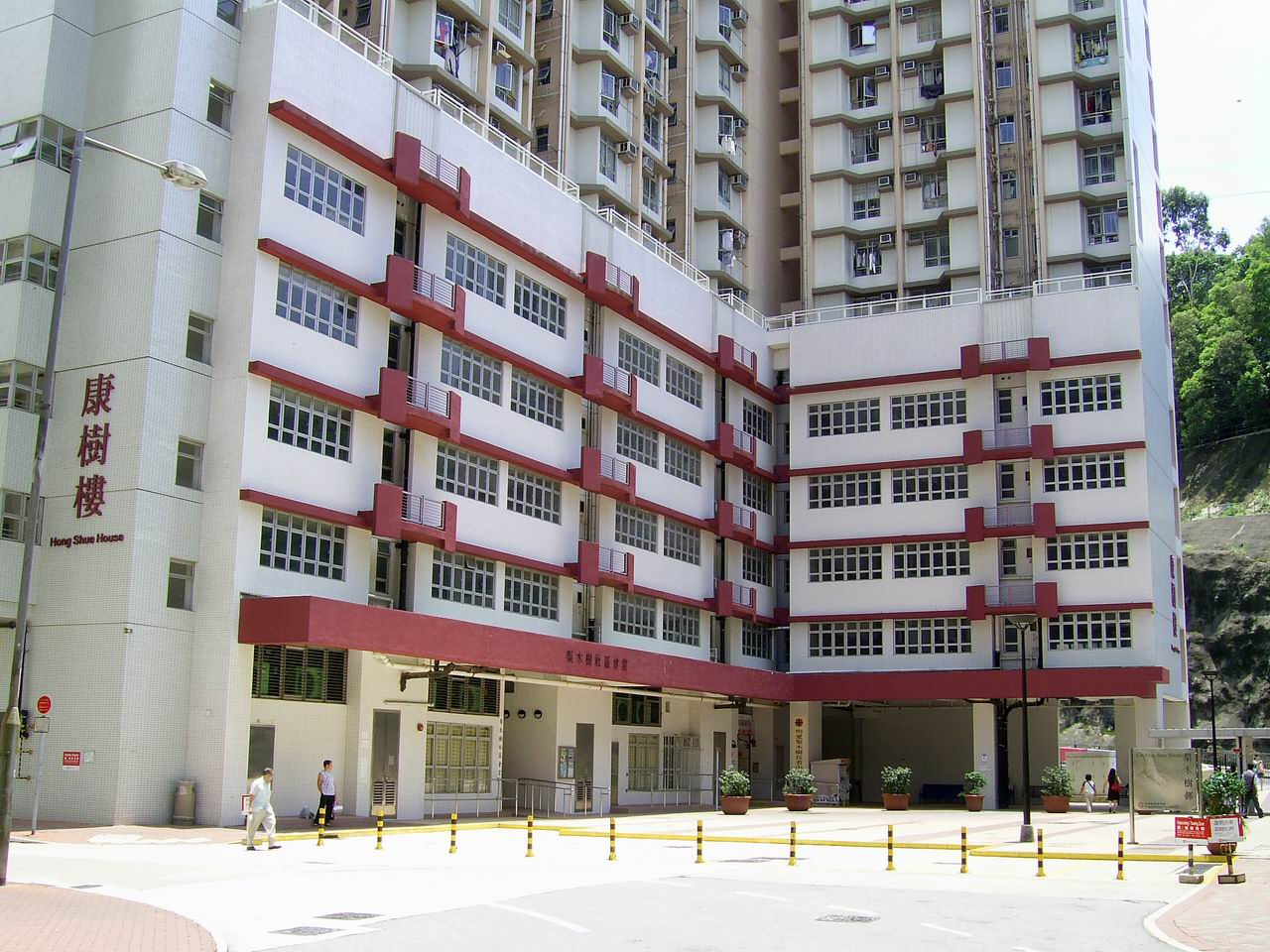
Lei Muk Shue Community Hall

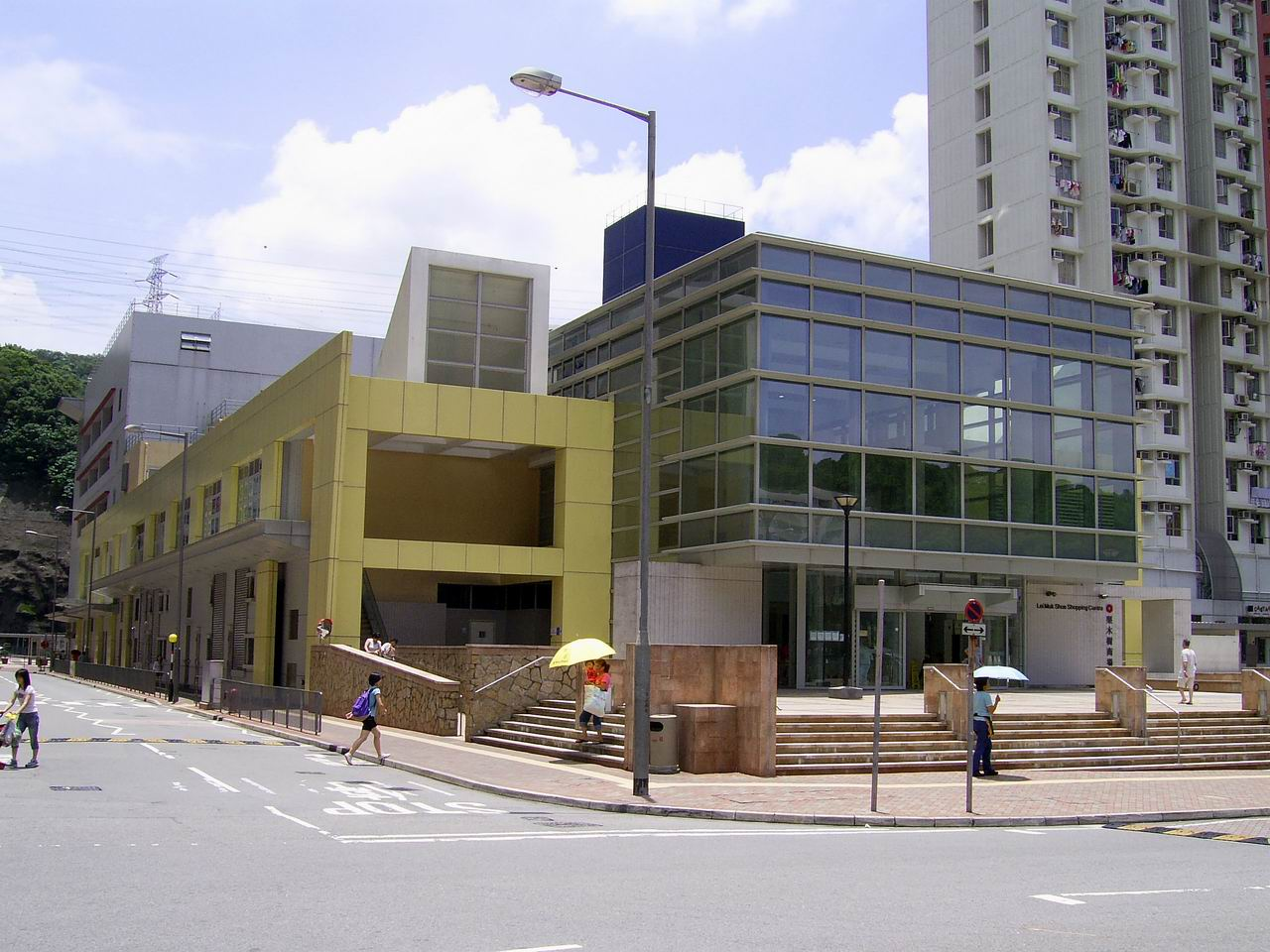
Lei Muk Shue Shopping Centre

Lei Muk Shue Estate (Chinese: 梨木樹邨) is a public housing estate in Sheung Kwai Chung, Tsuen Wan, New Territories, Hong Kong, near the exit of Shing Mun Tunnels. It is the largest public housing estate in the Tsuen Wan District, with a population of 28,100 as of December 2021. Although it is geographically located in Sheung Kwai Chung (literally means "Upper Kwai Chung"), administratively it belongs to the Tsuen Wan District instead of the Kwai Tsing District because it is at the west of Wo Yi Hop Road, the boundary between the two districts.

== History ==
Lei Muk Shue Estate was initially constructed in the 1970s, comprising 17 buildings. Redevelopment began in the 1990s, during which eight old buildings were demolished. Ten new buildings and a shopping center were constructed between 1998 and 2005.

== Houses ==
| Name | Type | Completion |
|---|---|---|
| Block 1 | Old Slab | 1975 |
| Block 2 | Old Slab | 1975 |
| Block 3 | Old Slab | 1975 |
| Block 4 | Old Slab | 1975 |
| Block 5 | Old Slab | 1975 |
| Block 6 | Old Slab | 1975 |
| Chuk Shue House | Old Slab | 1980 |
| Pak Shue House | Old Slab | 1980 |
| Yung Shue House | Old Slab | 1980 |
| Chung Shue House | Harmony 1 | 1998 |
| Kwai Shue House | Single Aspect Building | 2000 |
| Yeung Shue House | Harmony 1 | 2000 |
| Toa Shue House | Harmony 1 | 2000 |
| Fung Shue House | Harmony 1 | 2000 |
| Chui Shue House | New Harmony Annex 5 Option 1 | 2005 |
| Hong Shue House | Small Household Block | 2005 |
| Wing Shue House | New Harmony 1 | 2005 |
| Lok Shue House | New Harmony 1 | 2005 |
| Kin Shue House | New Harmony 1 | 2005 |
