= Hong Kong Housing Society =

Public housing society

- Founded: 1948; 78 years ago (incorporated 1951)
- Type: Non-profit non-governmental organisation
- Location: 28/F, World Trade Centre, Hong Kong
- Region served: Hong Kong
- Product: public housing
- Owner: Hong Kong Housing Society
- Key people: Walter Chan Ka-lok, Chairman
- Revenue: HK$1,769,000,000
- Employees: 1218
- Website: hkhs.com

Hong Kong Housing Society
- Traditional Chinese: 香港房屋協會
- Simplified Chinese: 香港房屋协会
Transcriptions
Standard Mandarin
- Hanyu Pinyin: Xiānggǎng Fángwū Xiéhuì
Yue: Cantonese
- Yale Romanization: hēung góng fòhng ūk hip wuih
- Jyutping: Hoeng1 gong2 fong4 uk1 hip3 wui6

Housing Society
- Traditional Chinese: 房屋協會
Transcriptions
Yue: Cantonese
- Yale Romanization: Fòhng ūk hip wuih
- Jyutping: Fong4 uk1 hip3 wui6

The Hong Kong Housing Society, or Housing Society for short, is the second largest public housing provider in Hong Kong (the first being the Hong Kong Housing Authority). The Society housed around 130,000 residents as of 2020. The Housing Society has been a dedicated housing provider in constantly identifying the housing needs of different sectors of the community and developing housing options attuned to their needs. Since its inception, a total of over 73,000 units have been built under different housing schemes, including Rental Estate, Rural Public Housing, Urban Improvement Scheme, Flat-for-Sale Scheme, Sandwich Class Housing Scheme, Full Market Value Development, Urban Renewal Project, Senior Citizen Residences Scheme, The Tanner Hill and Subsidised Sale Flats project.

The society is a non-governmental organisation and non-profit organisation. The chairman of the society is Walter Chan (陳家樂) and the chief executive officer and executive director is Chan Yum-min (陳欽勉).

== History ==
Former logo of HKHS (1985-2008)

After the end of World War II in 1945, Hong Kong was devastated and traumatised in the post-war aftermath. There was material deprivation and a shortage of housing. Due to the incessant crises in the political arena in China, vast numbers of mainland refugees flocked to Hong Kong. They built huts and settled themselves on unoccupied hillsides, which worsened the already severe housing problem. At that time, Hong Kong had not yet devised any public housing policy, not to mention any departments to steer the planning and building of public housing.

In 1947, The Lord Mayor of London donated a sum of 14,000 pounds from its Air Raid Distress Fund to the Hong Kong Social Welfare Council. A member of the Council and the Anglican Bishop of Hong Kong, Ronald Hall, took the lead to use the donation to launch a housing organisation for mitigating Hong Kong's serious housing problems. Bishop Hall, together with a group of social leaders, established a committee which held its first meeting on 17 April 1948. HKHS was formally established in 1951 as a statutory body under Hong Kong Ordinance Chapter 1059. It was the first-ever independent statutory body in Hong Kong that undertook public housing affairs.

In 1952, the first rental housing estate in Hong Kong, Sheung Li Uk, was completed in Sham Shui Po, providing 5 blocks with 360 residential units and accommodating 1,900 tenants. To break out from the communal design which prevailed at that time, Sheung Li Uk provided self-contained flats with kitchens, bathrooms and balconies. Moreover, it was better planned and managed with the provision of community centres, public open spaces and basic play equipment for children, which became a prototype for future public housing.

From then on, HKHS has been launching various housing schemes and services to address the changing needs of the community.

== Property Development ==
- Rental Estates
- Rural public housing
- Urban Improvement Scheme
- Flat-for-Sale Scheme
- Sandwich Class Housing Scheme
- Full Market Value Development
- Urban Renewal Project
- Senior Citizen Residences Scheme
- The Tanner Hill
- Subsidised Sale Flats project.

== Business ==
- Property development
- Housing Society Elderly Resources Centre
- Property Management and Commercial Leasing
- Loan services
- Building Management and Maintenance Scheme
- Hong Kong Housing Society Academy

== See also ==
- Joyous Living senior housing project
- Hong Kong Housing Authority
- List of public housing estates in Hong Kong
