= Timeline of the Wang Fuk Court fire =

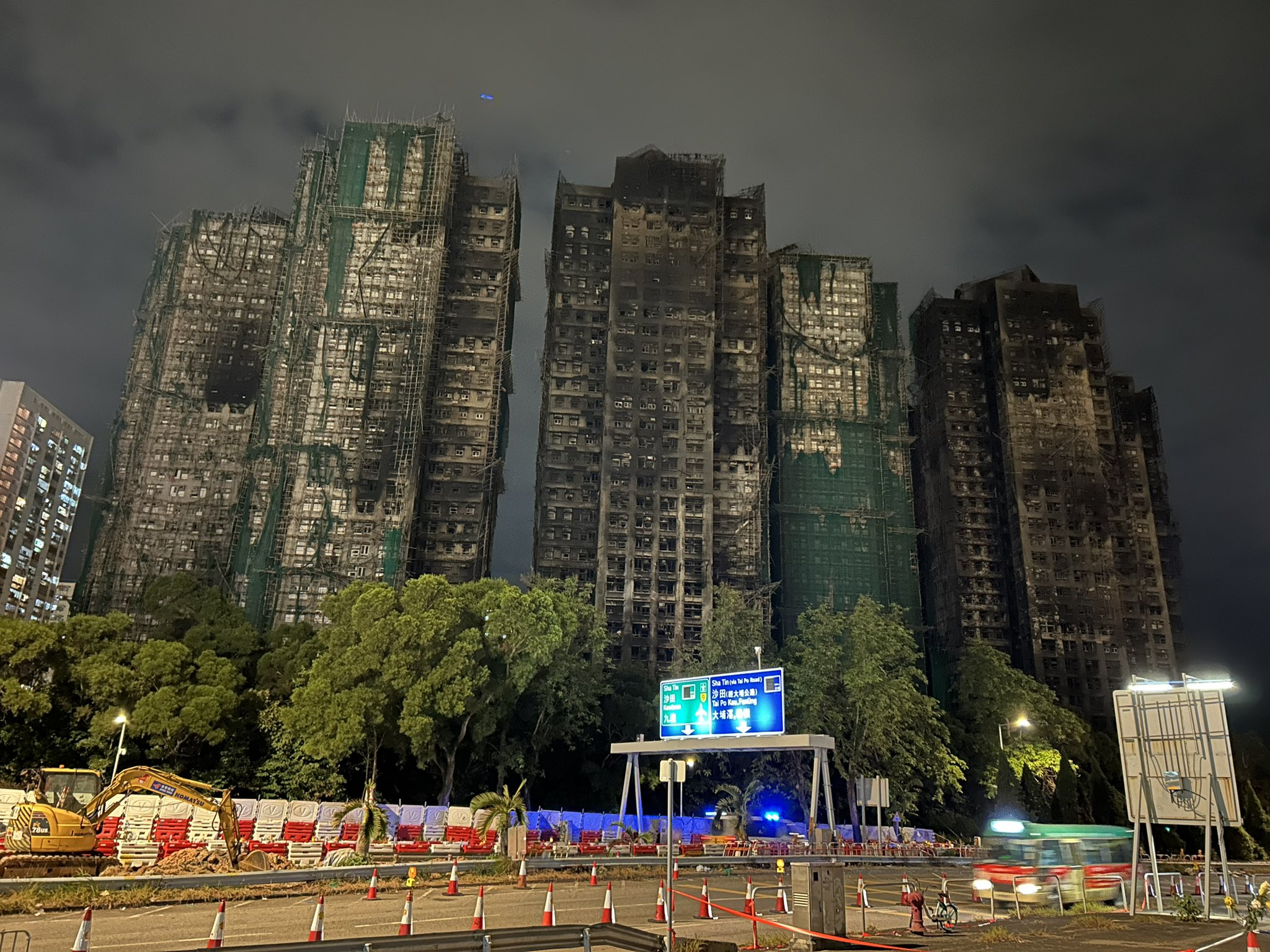
The burnt-out towers on 1 December 2025

This is the omnibus timeline of the Wang Fuk Court fire. All times HKT (UTC+08:00).

== 26 November 2025 ==
- ~14:00 — A resident of Block E smells smoke, spots a fire in an apartment in Block F, and being unable to contact property management goes down to Security in the lobby; already aware of the fire, they tell her to shelter in place.
- 14:45 — First eyewitness accounts of fire on the scaffolding of Block F; first social media footage. (It is remarked that there are no fire alarms).
- 14:51: The Fire Department receives its first report; fire fighters arrive ten minutes later. The police receive their first reports from passersby, and subsequently from residents who are unable to escape. Some residents state that they heard no fire alarm even though they had broken the fire alarm glass and pressed the button.
- 15:31 — The fire category is raised from Class 1 to Class 4.
- 18:22 — The fire is raised to Class 5 (the highest); it has begun its spread to all but one of the buildings of Wang Fuk Court.

== 27 November ==
In the early hours the first arrests are made, on suspicion of manslaughter; two directors of Prestige Construction and Engineering Company (the contractor), and one engineer.

- 01:50 —The fire complex is being brought under control with the open flames on three buildings being extinguished.
- 05:45 — Firefighting operations are carried between the fifth and eighteenth floors (sic), while rescue operations were being extended upwards to between the thirteenth and twenty-third floors.
- 06:23 — The fire in Block D is brought under control, and search and rescue efforts began on its lower floors.
- 09:00 — Four of the fires have been extinguished; fire in the three remaining blocks are still active.
- 15:10 — Many fire and rescue vehicles have been dispatched and 1,250 firefighters deployed. They receive 341 calls for help and successful responded to 279 of them. From the four buildings under control, there were no further calls for help. Four drones begin patrolling.
- 23:15 — Block F reignites despite measures; Blocks A and B continue to have harsh embers burning.

== 28 November ==
The Independent Commission Against Corruption (ICAC) arrests eight people on suspicion of corruption.

01:20 — With the exception of four apartment units still burning, the fire fighting operation is declared largely complete. The major rescue operations have also been completed, with all apartment units within the seven buildings having been forcibly accessed to ensure that no survivors remained trapped.

05:45 — An apartment reignites; it is put out at 07:30, less than two hours later.

10:18 — After 43 hours the fire complex is almost entirely extinguished and finally under control. Up to 2,311 firefighters were involved throughout the effort, with peak temperatures in some areas estimated at 500 °C (932 °F).

== 1 December ==
The confirmed death toll is 151. Some 40 individuals are still missing (some of whom may never be identified having been burnt to ash); bodies are still being found in continuing police sweeps. Thirteen individuals have been arrested for suspected manslaughter.

== 3 December ==
Of the 15 people arrested, six are suspected of having deactivated fire alarms during the renovation.

The search for bodies (the recovery mission) concludes. 19 bodies still require identification, and 31 remain unaccounted for.

According to the Society for the Prevention of Cruelty to Animals (SPCA), over 500 animals were trapped in the buildings during the fire; the organization provided triage. 294 pets were rescued, including fish, cats, dogs, and turtles, among other species; 70 had died. (Police searching for human remains later found and rescued three cats and a turtle.)

== See also ==
- List of building or structure fires
- List of fires in high-rise buildings
