= Pet policy in public housing estates in Hong Kong =

Hong Kong Pet Restrictions

The current pet keeping policy in public housing estates in Hong Kong was introduced in 2003 by the Housing Department after the outbreak of Severe Acute Respiratory Syndrome (SARS). Its objective is to improve the hygiene of public housing estates. Under the policy, public housing tenants are allowed to keep small household pets such as cats and birds but are prohibited from keeping dogs at their premises except under special circumstances, subject to the approval granted by the Housing Authority. The policy has led to debates and calls for amendments.

== History and background ==
=== Origin of the prohibition of pet keeping ===
==== Tenancy agreement of the housing authority ====
The tenancy agreements signed between the housing authority and the tenants of public rental housing (PRH) and interim housing estates stipulate that tenants cannot keep any animal, bird or livestock in their premises without prior consent. The Housing Department, which is responsible for receiving and attending to complaints from the tenants, adopted a tolerant approach towards the keeping of small animals that in general do not bring hygiene and environmental nuisance to other tenants. The department also allowed the keeping of dogs for persons with visual and audio disabilities. Yet, the department enforced the regulation only upon receipt of complaints.

=== Timeline of the Evolvement of the Policy ===
==== May 2003: The outbreak of SARS and proposed marking scheme ====
After the outbreak of SARS in Hong Kong in 2003, on 5 May 2003, the then Chief Executive Tung Chee-hwa established “Team Clean” for entrenching a high level of public and environmental hygiene in Hong Kong. In response to the epidemic and Team Clean's recommendations, the Housing Department took a number of initiatives to improve cleanliness of public housing estates. Marking Scheme for Tenancy Enforcement in Public Rental and Interim Housing Estates was one of the 18 measures proposed by the Housing Department. Under the system, offences to be covered are divided into three categories. According to Annex A of the meeting memorandum, “keeping animal, bird or livestock inside leased premises” was classified under Category B, which would cause an allotment of 5 penalty points upon violation. The department suggested implementing the proposed Marking Scheme on 1 July 2003.

==== 29 May 2003: Endorsement of marking scheme ====
In a meeting of the Subsidised Housing Committee of the Housing Authority on 29 May 2003, the proposed marking scheme was endorsed.

==== 1 Aug 2003 - 31 Oct 2003: Grace period ====
After the endorsement of the Marking Scheme, a number of animal concern groups and dog-lovers demanded a removal of the penalty relating to the keeping of animals in public rental housing estate. The Hong Kong Concern Group for Pets (CGP) and Society for the Prevention of Cruelty to Animals (SPCA) are examples of opposing voices to the policy. The groups expressed their concerns over the abandonment and death of animals kept by current public rental housing tenants and the possible increase of risk of the outbreak of diseases like rabies. They made three requests to the government, including a) removal of the misdeed item on “keeping animal, bird and livestock” from the Marking Scheme; b) allowing grandfathering of dogs already kept by the tenants in PRH in the short term; and c) eventual deletion of the clause that restricts the keeping of animals in PRH from the tenancy agreement.

Due to the overwhelming public concern over the issue, the Housing Department originally allowed a two-month grace period (1 Aug 2003 to 30 Sept 2003) for the enforcement against animal keeping under the Marking Scheme. Yet, upon the endorsement, members of the Subsidised Housing Committee decided that the new policy against animal keeping shall take effect from 1 Nov 2003. The grace period was therefore extended for one month to 31 Oct 2003. During the grace period, there would be no enforcement of the Marking Scheme against animal keeping.

==== 25 Sep 2003: Relaxing the prohibition ====
Upon the receipt of complaints over the prohibition from various animal rights concern groups, the Subsidised Housing Committee decided to relax the scope of animals affected by the prohibition, and to adopt more flexible approaches to households that were keeping dogs at that time.

From 23 to 28 Aug 2003, the Housing Authority conducted a public opinion survey with 4,004 PRH residents out of 606,600 households by means of telephone interview. 43.7% of the respondents cited “foul public areas” as their primary reason against pet keeping in PRH flats. Based on the result, the Subsidised Housing Committee decided to allow the keeping of service dogs, small household pets and desexed cats since they do not impose hygiene related hazards and nuisance.

For small dogs (not over 20 kg in weight) currently kept in the estates, the “grandfathering approach” was adopted. Under the approach, small dogs that were kept before 1 Aug 2003, if registered with documentary evidences on licensing, vaccination, micro-chipping and desexing, were allowed to be kept until the natural death of the dog. Nevertheless, estates under the Tenants Purchase Scheme were not benefited from the relaxation of rules about dog keeping, since these estates had established their own Owners’ Corporations and tenants were regulated by the Deed of Mutual Covenants which stipulates the prohibition of dog keeping in those estates.

==== Second Quarter of 2010: Intensified efforts to control dog keeping ====
At the end of 2009, the Subsidised Housing Committee decided to strengthen actions against unauthorised dog keeping in the PRH estates in the second quarter of 2010. Several approaches, including a) revalidating Temporary Permission Rule; b) flexibly deploying Special Teams to detect unauthorised dog keeping; c) adopting tighter control of visitors carrying dogs to domestic blocks by the security guards; and d) encouraging tenants to report unauthorised dog keeping in PRH estates through radio broadcast and posters.

The intensified efforts incurred one-off expenditure for intensified publicity, educational programmes and installation of ten extra Mobile Digital Closed Circuit Television System (MDCCTV) sets amounting to $2.5 million. The monthly charges for the additional Special Teams were $183,000.

==== Early 2012: AFCD’s modification on the dog application form ====
On 29 March 2010, the Audit Commission issued a report on “Control of Pet Animals”. The Commission suggested in the report that the Housing Department should liaise with the Agriculture, Fisheries and Conservation Department (AFCD) to handle the problem of unauthorised dog keeping in public housing flats. The Director of Housing agreed with the audit recommendation, and the Director of AFCD agreed to offer support to the Director of Housing. Therefore, AFCD modified and finalised the dog application form which would be used starting from early 2012. After the modification, relevant licensing information of the concerned dog and owner could be transferred to the Housing Department for investigation and enforcement action.

==== 10 Nov 2015: The establishment of subcommittee on issues relating to animal welfare and cruelty to animals ====
On 10 Nov 2015, the Panel of Food Safety and Environmental Hygiene in the Legislative Council agreed to establish the Subcommittee on Issues Relating to Animal Welfare and Cruelty to Animals. The Subcommittee recommended that the Panel should formulate an animal-friendly policy to better protect the welfare of animals, including reviewing the policy on the keeping of animals by public housing tenants. Multiple concern groups were invited to attend meetings of the Subcommittee to express their views on animal keeping in PRH estates. Different Legislative Council members also expressed in the Subcommittee their concerns over the prohibition.

==== 11 Jan 2016: Authorising the keeping of companion dogs ====
In 2015, the “懇請政府重訂屋宇飼養犬隻條例聯盟” (no English name available) (now renamed as Give Dogs A Home 給狗狗一個家) started a series of actions, such as pledge signing and setting up opinion gathering booths to demand further relaxation of the prohibition of dog keeping in PRH estates. Since 25 Sep 2015, the group met representatives from the Housing Authority several times to discuss on the possibility of allowing more tenants in PRH estates to keep dogs.

On 11 Jan 2016, the Housing Authority declared to allow tenants with strong special needs to keep a companion dog. Medical proof would be required.

==== 26 Jun 2017: Subcommittee on issues relating to animal welfare and cruelty to animals discussing animal keeping in PRH Estates ====
On 26 June 2017, the Subcommittee to Study Issues Relating to Animal Rights of the Legislative Council called a meeting to discuss animal-friendly policies in Hong Kong. Attendees included officials from the Housing Department, the Food and Health Bureau and Transport Department were present in the meeting, as well as representatives from 19 animal interest groups.

Legislative Councillors Claudia Mo and Raymond Chan Chi-chuen of People Power jointly tabled a motion to urge the government to loosen the ban on pet dogs in public housing estates in order to reduce the number of abandoned dogs, and the motion was passed by the Subcommittee members unanimously.

Meanwhile, Legislative Councillor Roy Kwong Chun-yu of the Democratic Party said that if the government hopes to implement animal-friendly policies in Hong Kong, it should stop limiting itself by using “restrictions of current regulations” as an excuse.

== Current regulations ==
=== Marking scheme for estate management enforcement ===
The current pet keeping policy in Public Housing Estates adopts the blueprint of the Marking Scheme for Estate Management Enforcement introduced in 2003, under which public rental housing (PRH) estate tenants and Interim Housing (IH) licensees would be penalised for misdeeds affecting estate management. As aforementioned, with effect from 1 November 2003, if a tenant keeps animals, birds or livestocks inside leased premises without prior written consent of the Housing Authority, he or she will be allotted 5 penalty points without warning. When a PRH / IH household has accrued 16 points within two years, its tenancy / licence will be liable to termination.

The Housing Authority granted a general permission for the keeping of small household pets as long as they do not cause nuisance or health hazard. No prior registration is required. Small household pets include cats, birds, hamsters, rabbits, aquatic life, etc. Cats kept in public housing estates should also be desexed. Wildlife, exotic animals and domesticated farm animals are strictly prohibited.

The Subsidised Housing Committee of the Housing Authority upheld its ban on dog keeping in public housing estates on 25 September 2003. Generally speaking, the Housing Authority will not approve application for dog keeping, except under special circumstances. The Housing Authority might exercise discretion and grant conditional approval to:

1. Physically impaired tenants who need to keep guide dogs and;
2. Tenants who need to keep companion dogs for mental support (provision of medical evidence from medical practitioners is required).
3. Tenants whose small dogs had been kept in the leased premises prior to the implementation of the Marking Scheme (i.e. The Temporary Permission Rule).

=== Temporary permission rule ===
The Temporary Permission Rule was adopted to handle dogs kept in public housing prior to the implementation of the Marking Scheme. The Rule stipulated that one-off permissions would be granted to tenants who applied to continue keeping small dogs (i.e. less than 20 kilograms in weight) which had been kept in the leased premises before 1 August 2003. Tenants who had been granted the permission should comply with the regulations for dog keeping. If there are two substantiated incidents of breaking rules, the permission would be withdrawn.

=== No further relaxation to the prohibition ===
In 2011, the then Hon Albert Chan Wai-yip submitted a question to the Transport and Housing Bureau in relation to whether or not the Housing Authority would consider relaxing the restrictions on dog keeping in suitable public housing estates. According to the reply given by Ms Eva Cheng, the then Secretary for Transport and Housing, the Housing Department had consulted around 140 Estate Management Advisory Committees (EMACs) on the policy of strictly prohibiting the keeping of unauthorised dogs at the end of 2010 and all EMACs indicated support to continue with the policy on banning unauthorised dog keeping. The Housing Authority had no intention to further relax the control on dog keeping by tenants since it believed that doing so would be in conflict with providing a clean and hygienic living environment in public housing estates.

=== Statistics of households keeping dogs in public rental houses and interim housing estates ===
According to the Housing Authority, between 2003 and 2016, the number of dogs registered in public housing estates fell down from 13,000 to about 1,600.

Table: Number of Households Keeping Dogs in Public Rental Houses and Interim Housing Estates
Time	Number of households
2003 (before the implementation of Marking Scheme)	17,000
October 2003	13,323
November 2009	9,500
March 2011	8,400
February 2012	7,200
February 2013	5,500
December 2013	4,740
December 2014	4,200
December 2015	2,200
December 2016	1,600

=== Statistics of enforcement of the marking scheme ===
Prior to the implementation of the Marking Scheme, from 2000 to 2002, the number of warnings regarding animal keeping issued was 976. Since the implementation of the Scheme, according to the Housing Authority, from 2003 to 2015, there have been 4,512 points-allotted cases due to the keeping of animal, bird or livestock inside leased premises without prior written consent.

Table: Enforcement of the Marking Scheme
	Year(s) of	Number of warnings issued on animal keeping	Number of allotted-point cases regarding the keeping of animals without consent
Prior to the implementation of Marking Scheme	2000-2002	976	/
After the implementation of Marking Scheme	2004	7	/
After the implementation of Marking Scheme	2003-2009	/	1,145
After the implementation of Marking Scheme	2010	/	580
After the implementation of Marking Scheme	2014	/	569
After the implementation of Marking Scheme	2015	/	602
After the implementation of Marking Scheme	2016	/	552

== Controversies ==
Under the “Marking Scheme”, “small household pets” were tolerated, as long as they do not create any health hazard and nuisance. Therefore, the controversy on pet policy in public housing focuses on dog keeping.

A major controversy of the policy is the Housing Department’s measures to track unpermitted dogs. In May 2015, many public housing estates simultaneously served notice to tenants to remind them not to keep dogs without written permission.

In late May 2015, it was widely reported by media that the staff of the Housing Department used unreasonable ways to detect unpermitted dogs in public housing estate. They deliberately hit the gates of different households and played recordings of dog barking to provoke dogs in the households to bark, and thus, to detect and punish households which broke the regulations. In July 2015, a public housing tenant tried to commit suicide by slitting her wrist because the staff of Housing Authority kept pressing her to remove her dog, causing great psychological pressure on her.

In response to the Housing Department’s tactics, two social networking groups “Dog Rights Concern Group” and “爭取公屋居屋合法飼養狗隻 (no English name available)” jointly organised a candlelight vigil on the Legislative Council Square at Admiralty on 20 September 2015. The organisers submitted a petition letter to the Housing Department and the Transport Department, requesting a deferral in tracking dogs in public housing and a dialogue with them. Legislative Councillor Claudia Mo, as well as representatives from Civic Party Animal Rights Concern Group, Non-Profit making Veterinary Services Society, Animal Earth, Wild Boar Concern Group and “十八區動物保護專員” (no English name available) also attended the candlelight vigil to put pressure on the government.

== Recommendations and opinions by different stakeholders ==
=== Concern groups ===
The following interest groups are forerunners in advomacating the right to keeping pets in PRH estates (see the table below).

Table: Basic Information of Different Interest Groups Advocating the Right to Keeping Pets in PRH Estates
Interest Group	Time of Foundation	Representative
Society for the Prevention of Cruelty to Animals (Hong Kong) (香港愛護動物協會)	1903	Gigi Fu (傅明憲) (chairperson)
Society for Abandoned Animals Ltd (保護遺棄動物協會有限公司)	June 4, 1997	陳淑娟, 范韻清 and 周蕙蕙 (No English names available) (Founders)
Animal Earth (動物地球)	February, 2006	張婉雯 (No English name available) (executive committee member)
Mongrel Club (唐狗會)	October, 2006	Rebecca Ngan (Founder)
Cat Society (香港群貓會)	July, 2007	Elaine Chan (陳靈怡) (Founder and chairman)
Alliance for Earth, Life, Liberty & Advocacy (AELLA) Asia	January 1, 2010	Gilda Ho (Director)
Animal-Friendly Alliance (動物友善政策關注小組)	2010	卓志超 (No English name available) (chairman)
Hong Kong Seeing Eye Dog Services (香港導盲犬服務中心)	January 11, 2012	Raymond Cheung (張偉民)
Animal Saver Hong Kong	August 4, 2015	Ricco Cheung (Manager (Public Relations))
Mogrel Dog Lovers (唐狗就是寶)	October 18, 2016	Gabee Mak (麥淑貞) (Founder)
Paws Hero (動物英雄聯盟)	2016	林顥伊 (No English name available)
城鄉動物隊 (No English name available)	Before 2017	張婉麗 (No English name available) (Team Leader)
Gives Dogs A Home (給狗狗一個家)	Before 2016	林進文 (No English name available) (executive director)

==== The Society for the Prevention of Cruelty to Animals (香港愛護動物協會) ====
The Society provided that public housing estates is the source of 20% of abandoned dogs in all SPCA's cases in 2015. Therefore, its deputy director of welfare, Dr. Fiona Woodhouse, said there was an urgent need to re-examine the strict rules relating to dog keeping in public housing. The Housing Authority should change the rules of pet keeping to reflect a positive approach for public housing households to have the option to keep dogs.

==== Society for Abandoned Animals Ltd (保護遺棄動物協會有限公司) ====
SAA worried that although dog keeping is not allowed in PRH estates, some people still secretly keep dogs. To avoid more serious consequences caused by dog keeping, such as dog keepers not bringing their dog to do the required rabies vaccination, it may be better to allow dog keeping and establish rules for regulation. In the past 14 years, residents have had an increasing demand for pet dogs because dogs form a crucial part of the families and help alleviate pressure. They recommended the government to refer to the dog keeping regulations of some private housing estates. For example, in some private housing estates, if there are two households complaining reasonably, the concerned dog keeping household would then not longer be allowed to keep their dog.

==== Mongrel Club (唐狗會) ====
The founder of Mongrel Club, Rebecca Ngan, pointed out that more and more families are keeping pets but the government's public housing policy cannot address the changing social needs. She suggested the government reserve several blocks in which dog keeping is allowed in future new public housing estates and set limit to the number of dogs that can be kept. Also, the group advised the government to strengthen education to dog keepers, schools and society, so to minimise the inconvenience caused by dog keeping to neighbourhoods, and nurture the sense of respect to animals among society. She also urged the Agriculture, Fisheries and Conservation Department to extend its duty towards animal welfare and promoting the peaceful co-existence of human and animals.

==== Cat Society (香港群貓會) ====
The Society suggested cat owners in PRH estates not to bring their cats to public area, so to avoid problems such as losing cats and frightening of cats.

==== Alliance for Earth, Life, Liberty & Advocacy (AELLA) Asia ====
The group believed that the corresponding authority of the government should exercise control on dog-keeping instead of imposing a blanket ban on dog keeping in PRH. They also recommended the government to allow pet keeping in new PRH houses.

==== Animal-Friendly Alliance (動物友善政策關注小組) ====
Kevin Cheuk, Chairman of the Animal-Friendly Alliance, recommended the government to allow dog keeping in future new PRH estates and estates under Home Ownership Scheme to alleviate the problem of pet abandonment and increase the possibility of dog keeping in PRH estates. He also proposed the idea of “Dr. Dog in PRH”. The group also suggested mandatory education for dog keepers in PRH estates. The recommended testing period of this suggested policy was three years.

==== Hong Kong Seeing Eye Dog Services (香港導盲犬服務中心) ====
Chairman of the Hong Kong Seeing Eye Dog Services, Raymond Cheung (張偉民), expressed that one of biggest challenged in training eye dogs in Hong Kong is the prohibition of dog keeping in PRH estates. This imposes difficulties on family and society trainings to young guide dogs, because the policy prevents half of the total households in Hong Kong from become fostering home of these young dogs. The group hoped that the government could place more emphasis on eye dog services and trainings.

==== Animal Saver Hong Kong ====
The group found that a large portion of abandoned cats and dogs were from private or public housing estates in which animal keeping is not allowed. Therefore, the group require the government to adopt more open attitude to animal keeping housing estates.

==== Mongrel Dog Lovers (唐狗就是寶) ====
The representative of Mongrel Dog Lovers group, Gabee Mak (麥淑貞) criticised the government for being too conservatives and sensitive than ordinary citizens towards any change in animal policy, including the pet policy in public housing. In the new public housing estates, the Housing Authority should designate several blocks in which dog keeping is allowed.

Mongrel Dog Lovers also found that it was the government who should shoulder up the responsibility to support, advertise, educate, promote and monitor when adopting animal friendly policies. First, the group suggested the government consider setting a “dog keeper education and licensing system”, in order to educate potential dog keepers how to keep a dog without causing nuisance to the public. Secondly, the group recommended the government to enforce strictly the Rabies Ordinance (Cap.421) s.23, which stipulates that dogs in public must be on a leash or otherwise under control for the sake of cynophobia persons. Currently, the negative perception towards pet keeping was caused by the selfish behaviour of a small number of pet owners in public housing.

==== 城鄉動物隊 ====
張婉麗 (no English name available), representative of 城鄉動物隊, thought that the blame on hygienic problems is on the pet owners, rather than on the pets; even if an irresponsible person does not keep pets, he/she will still make the living environment dirty.

==== Give Dogs A Home (給狗狗一個家) ====
In the July 1 march in 2015, 懇請政府重訂屋宇飼養犬隻條例聯盟 (the former name of “Give Dogs A Home”) called the public to pay more attention to the dogs’ living space in Hong Kong. They advocated that banning of dog keeping would lead to the problem dog abandonment, and wished the government to evaluate the current policies.

In June 2017, Give Dogs A Home conducted a survey to investigate whether people support dog keeping in PRH estates. 45% of the respondents were living in PRH estates while 14% were living in housing estates under the House Ownership Scheme. The group claimed that only 10 interviewees did not support PRH tenants keeping dogs, meaning that over 99% of the interviewees support dog keeping in PRH estates. The group found the root cause lies in the unresponsiveness of government to recommendations given by the public. They suggested different government departments, such as the Housing Department, Agriculture, Fisheries and Conservation Department and Leisure and Cultural Services Department, to cooperate instead of working on their own when implementing animal friendly policies.

=== Legislative council members ===
==== Ms. Claudia Mo ====
In the meeting of Subcommittee on Issues Relating to Animal Welfare and Cruelty to Animals of the Legislative Council on 26 Jun 2017, Mo suggested that the Housing Authority should further relax the prohibition of keeping dogs in PRHs.

==== Mr. Nathan Law Kwun-chung ====
In the same meeting on 26 Jun 2017, Law expressed that the bureaucracy causes Hong Kong being left behind the international trend of promoting animal rights. Concerning dog keeping, Law required the Housing Department to disclose a) the number of unauthorised dog keeping cases in recent years; b) the number of cases of nuisance caused by small pets (cat, hamster, rabbits, etc.) and dogs; c) the number of application of keeping “companion dog” and the number of approved applications; d) the number of dogs in PRHs with “temporary permission”; and e) the number of service dogs approved in PRH estates. Law also asked the department to report on their progress of following up public's suggestions, and asked for clarification on means used by staff of the department when inspecting unauthorised dog keeping.

==== Mr. Raymond Chan Chi-chuen ====
Chan suggested the government to modify their survey for PRH estates tenants to gather tenants’ opinion towards keeping different types of dogs, such as eye dogs, adopted dogs, etc.

==== Mr. Roy Kwong Chun-yu ====
Kwong expressed that the government should not use “regulations” as an excuse of not adopting animal friendly policies. He also called the public to pay attention to Animal Protection Law, which was proposed by Kwong in the Legislative Council in June 2017, so to further promote animal rights in Hong Kong.

=== Public ===
==== Tenants in PHR estates ====
In 2003, the Housing Authority conducted a survey and asked 4,004 tenants for their opinion on whether pet keeping should be allowed in PRH estates. Result showed that 69.2% of the PRH tenants found that pet keeping should not be allowed in PRH flats.

In the Public Housing Recurrent Survey of 2011, 2015 and 2016, PRH estates tenants were asked for their opinion on whether or not they find the Marking Scheme was effective in prohibiting unauthorised dog keeping in premises.

Table: PRH Estates Tenants’ Response in Public Housing Recurrent Survey of 2011, 2015 and 2016 (Question: Whether the Marking Scheme was effective in prohibiting unauthorised dog keeping in premises)
	Yes	No	Don't know / No Comment
2011	57.7%	35%	7.3%
2015	48%	43%	9%
2016	54%	41%	5%

==== General public ====
Contrarily, in a survey conducted by Give Dogs A Home (給狗狗一個家) in 2017, over 99% of the interviewees supported dog keeping in PRH estates.

A commenter pointed out that the rental contract of public housing includes a clause “II (19) Not to keep any animal, bird or livestock of any description in the said premises or any part thereof without the prior written consent of the Landlord.” Therefore, tenants already know that keeping unpermitted dogs is not allowed before they do so. It is a breach of contract to violate the regulation.

=== Housing department / housing authority ===
On 17 July 2017, the Director of Housing issued a written response to the motion of urging the new-term government to be committed to studying a further relaxation of the dog keeping policy in PRH estates proposed by the Subcommittee to Study Issues Relating to Animal Rights of the Legislative Council on 27 June 2017. The department responded that the PRH estates built by Housing Authority are of multi-storey building design and densely populated. Therefore, when considering keeping dogs in these estates the possibility of inducing noise and hygiene nuisance must be taken into consideration. Some degree of relaxation, such as allowing tenants to keep guide dogs and companion dogs, allowed the policy to be one that respects both tenants demanding hygienic, quite and safe living environment in general and those with special medical needs of keeping dogs. The department expressed that the overall interests and aspirations of all tenants and good management should come first during their formation of animal keeping policy. Therefore, Housing Authority would maintain the existing dog keeping policy in PRH estates at the present stage.

Meanwhile, Chief Management Manager (Support and Service) of the Housing Department, Mr. Ng Shu Chung (吳樹中) reckoned that it is impossible to loosen the restriction of pet dogs in public housing. The resources of public housing are limited and valuable so both pet keeping tenants and tenants without pets should be treated the same in terms of resource enjoyment.

== Policy comparison ==
=== Singapore ===
The Housing and Development Board (HDB) is in charge of the management of public housing in Singapore, including setting rules on pet keeping. Currently, the HDB allows a wide range of pets to be kept in public housing: dogs, rabbits, guinea pigs, hamsters, gerbils, mice, chinchillas, red-eared sliders, birds, fish, land hermit crabs, green tree frogs and Malayan box turtles. A cursory review of the HDB website on November 6, 2020, reveals that cat ownership has been prohibited in public housing.

However, each household can only keep one dog on the list of approved breeds (see the table below). If the households fail to comply with this regulation, they will need to pay a fine up to SGD$4,000 (around HK$23,000) at maximum.

Large dog breeds are excluded on the list. According to a statement issued by the Ministry of National Development (MND), the HDB's principle is “to preserve a pleasant living environment and good neighbourly relations” and they “need to strike a balance between residents who are pet lovers and those who may have concerns about the keeping of pets in HDB flats.” The MND thought that small dogs, in contrast to large dogs, are “more manageable and easily carried, especially in confined public spaces such as lifts”.

However, at the same time, the HDB initiated the Project ADORE (ADOption and REhoming of dogs) in June 2011 to encourage people to adopt dogs by loosening the restriction on dog size, from 15 kg in weight and 50 cm in height, to 10 kg in weight and 40 cm at the shoulders. The Scheme involved the cooperation with Action for Singapore Dogs (ASD), Singapore Society for the Prevention of Cruelty to Animals (Singapore SPCA) and Save Our Street Dogs (SOSD).

Under the Animals and Birds (Dog Licensing and Control) Rules, all dogs are required be licensed for rabies control at the Agri-Food and Veterinary Authority (AVA). If dog owners let their dogs defecate in public places and cause environmental damage, the National Environment Agency (NEA) will take actions against them.

In addition, the HDB expressly prohibited cats because cats would shed fur, defecate and urinate in public area, and they also make caterwauling sounds. Therefore, they would cause inconvenience to the neighbourhood.

==== Types of approved dog breeds ====
List of approved dog breeds
1	Affenpinscher	22	Griffon Belge	43	Pug
2	Australian Silky Terrier	23	German Hunting Terrier	44	Poodle (Miniature)
3	Australian Terrier	24	Griffon Brabancon	45	Schipperke
4	Bichon Frise	25	Hairless Dog	46	Scottish Terrier
5	Bohemian Terrier	26	Italian Greyhound	47	Sealyham Terrier
6	Bolognese	27	Jack Russell Terrier	48	Shetland Sheep dog
7	Brussels Griffon (Griffon Bruxaellois)	28	Japanese Spaniel (Chin)	49	Shih Tzu
8	Bichon Havanese	29	Japanese Spitz	50	Silky Terrier
9	Border Terrier	30	Lhasa Apso	51	Small Continental Spaniel
10	Boston Terrier (a) Lightweight (b) Middleweight	31	Little Lion Dog	52	Small English Terrier
11	Cairn Terrier	32	Lakeland Terrier	53	Small Spitz
12	Cavalier King Charles Spaniel	33	Maltese	54	Smooth Fox Terrier
13	Chihuahua	34	Manchester Terrier	55	Toy Fox Terrier
14	Chinese Crested Dog	35	Miniature Pinscher	56	Toy Terrier
15	Chinese Imperial Chin	36	Miniature Schnauzer	57	Tibetan Spaniel
16	Chinese Temple Dog (Classic and Miniature)	37	Norfolk Terrier	58	Volpino Italiano
17	Coton de tulear	38	Norwich Terrier	59	West Highland Terrier
18	Czech Terrier	39	Papillon	60	Wire-Haired Fox Terrier
19	Dachshund (Light and Miniature)	40	Pekinese	61	Welsh Terrier
20	Dandie Dinmont Terrier	41	Pomeranian	62	Yorkshire Terrier
21	English Toy Spaniel	42	Poodle		

=== Taiwan ===
The public housing in Taiwan, known as “National Housing” (國民住宅), is categorised into two types: for sale and for lease. According to the officials in the Department of Urban Development of Taipei City Government, in early years, the lease agreement of National Housing banned pet keeping.

However, in 2014, pets started to be allowed on the condition that the pets are not dangerous and would not bark, cause smell and urinate. If a pet owner is reported for noise nuisance, failure to clean up the urine of pets and causing injury to other residents for 3 times, then the tenancy of National Housing would be terminated.

Currently, Article 16 of the “Condominium Administration Act Building Administration Division” (《公寓大廈管理條例》) stipulates that “Inhabitants with pets may not hinder public sanitation, peace or safety.” If the National Housing households break the regulation, the management committee of the buildings will give oral warning and warning letters, and even bring lawsuits.

Article 23 of the “Condominium Administration Act Building Administration Division” provides that unless special agreements are made to prohibit pet keeping by the inhabitants, National Housing households would not be barred from keeping pets.

On 7 July 2016, the Internal Administration Committee of the Legislative Yuan (立法院內政委員會) discussed the abolition of Article 23 to the effect that no community agreements can deprive residents of the right to keep pet. However, due to concerns over noise and hygienic problems caused by pets, the amendment would be postponed until public opinions are collected.

=== The United States ===
The Department of Housing and Urban Development (HUD) is responsible for providing public rental housing to the eligible low-income families, the elderly, and the disabled. Generally it provides the regulation that the elderly and the handicapped should not be discriminated against when applying to keep pets. In April 2013, the HUD issued new guidelines requiring housing providers to ensure reasonable accommodation for “assistance animals” and “service animals” kept by the needy tenants.

Yet the HUD allows local housing authorities to set specific local rules on pet keeping. In the Country of Santa Cruz, the Housing Authority allows both small and large pets.

It defines small pets as “pets kept in cages / aquariums such as hamsters, turtles, birds, and fish”. Each public housing unit can keep one cage or one aquarium. In either case two pets are allowed at maximum. However, the size of aquariums permitted varies from place to place inside the county. Small pet keepers are required to eliminate odors and maintain sanitary conditions, and are responsible for the damages caused by their pets.

For large pets such as dogs and cats, the Housing Authority limits the number to 1 in every unit and requires that the breed cannot exceed 25 pounds in size at adulthood. In particular, Pit Bulls, Dobermans, Rottweilers and Bull Dogs are banned as these breeds are vicious and intimidating. In addition to odor, hygiene and damages, large pet owners have the responsibility to avoid noise, keep their pets in control and clean the waste. Unlike small pet owners, the residents need to obtain certificates signed by a licensed veterinarian or government authority, as well as a pet license before they can apply for keeping large pets. Large pet owners also need to pay a deposit of US$300 (around HK$2,300) for potential damages caused by their pets.

If pet owners violate any rule, the Housing Authority will issue a notice to them, asking them to correct the violation or remove the pets. Otherwise, the Housing Authority will terminate the lease of Public Housing.

However, the Housing Authority would enter the unit for inspection only after reasonable notice is given to the residents.

=== The United Kingdom ===
In the Tendring District Council, public housing units are known as council homes, including houses, bungalows and flats. In deciding whether to grant permission, the council will take into account the type of council homes, the size of garden and open space, the breed and size of the pets, flat facilities, special needs of the pets, etc.

==== Types of animals allowed and disallowed ====
If the tenants have access to their own garden, then they can keep one dog or one cat, given that they do not cause nuisance or disturbance to other people. If they do not possess private gardens, they have to seek permission from the council. If the tenants want to keep more than one pet, the council will determine each pet request on its own merit before granting permission. Normally only one dog or two cats are allowed. However, if the tenants live in the council's sheltered housing schemes, then there is a blanket ban on keeping dogs or cats.

For livestocks such as horses, donkeys, goats, pigs, ducks, geese, chickens or any other reptiles, written permission from the council is needed. Reptiles and spiders are discouraged, unless the tenants can prove that they can meet the special care and welfare needs of them.

Yet, one must never keep animals prohibited by Dangerous Wild Animals Act 1976 due to safety concern. Exotic animals and farm animal, such as cockerels, are not allowed normally.

==== Pet keeping requirements ====
According to a guideline issued by the Tendring District Council, no animal can foul in the council homes or other lands of the council, cause nuisance or annoyance to others, or damages the council's properties.

The Council requires owners to have microscope or tattoo for their dogs and cats for the purpose of identification. No breeding of dog or cat is allowed.

Small animals such as rats, mice, gerbils and hamsters should be limited to manageable numbers in suitable living environment. For example, caged birds should be given sufficient space for spreading their wings fully and perching.

Under the Animal Welfare Act 2006, pet keepers have to ensure that their pets have suitable places to live and the right food to eat. They should be protected from pain, suffering, injury and disease. If council home tenants neglect or abuse their pets, the council will report to the Royal Society for the Prevention of Cruelty to Animals (RSPCA).

If tenants allow pets to wander, urinate or foul in communal areas, landings and walkways, then they would breach the tenancy agreement with the council, which would take back their right to keep pets and report to the RSPCA.

=== Australia ===
The Department of Housing and Public Works of the Queensland Government allows pets in public housing (including cluster housing, town houses, attached housing, apartments, flats, units, etc.), given prior approval from the department, compliance with local government laws, suitable environment in the housing and no interference with the peace, comfort and privacy of neighbours.

In general, two small birds in a cage and fish in an aquarium are allowed, but keeping a snake or a reptile requires a licence from the department and they must be placed in a safe cage. Dogs must be desexed by 7 months of age, while cats by 3 months of age.

However, if the cat and the dog will become heavier than 10 kg when fully grown, they may not be allowed. Different local governments set different restrictions on the number and types of pets allowed. Tenants can keep a Guide Dog, Hearing Dog or an Assistance Animal if they can provide relevant evidence to the tenancy manager.
