= 村 =

村 may refer to:

- Villages of China
- 邨, a variant character of 村 usually referring to public housing in Hong Kong
- Villages of Japan
