= Public housing in Hong Kong =

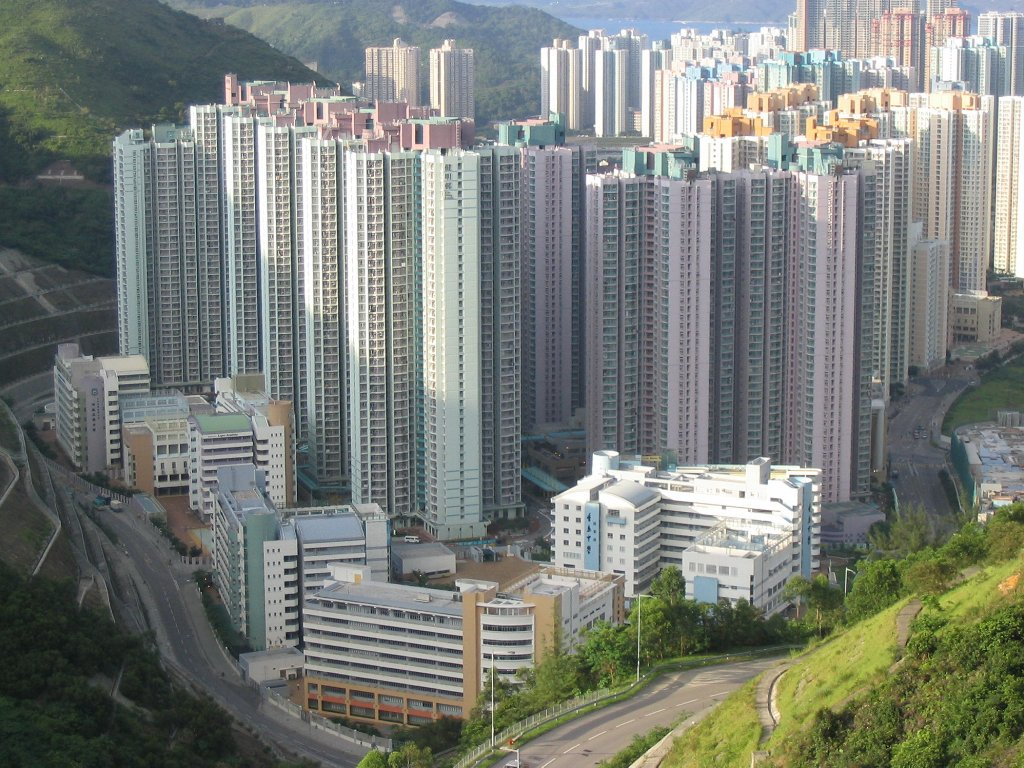
Kin Ming Estate, completed in 2003 in Tseung Kwan O, consists of 10 housing blocks of New Harmony I design, housing about 22,000 people.

Public housing in Hong Kong is a set of mass housing programmes through which the Government of Hong Kong provides affordable housing for lower-income residents. It is a major component of housing in Hong Kong, with nearly half of the population now residing in some form of public housing. The public housing policy dates to 1954, after a fire in Shek Kip Mei destroyed thousands of shanty homes and prompted the government to begin constructing homes for the poor.

Public housing is mainly built by the Hong Kong Housing Authority and the Hong Kong Housing Society. Rents and prices are significantly lower than those for private housing and are heavily subsidised by the government, with revenues partially recovered from sources such as rents and charges collected from car parks and shops within or near the residences.

Many public housing estates are built in the new towns of the New Territories, but urban expansion has left some older estates deep in central urban areas. They are found in every district of Hong Kong except in Wan Chai District. The vast majority of public housing are provided in high-rise buildings, and recent blocks usually comprise 40 or more storeys.

The government has in recent years begun to prioritise economic benefit rather than meeting the demand of citizens. This has led to many citizens who are unable to afford private housing to seek accommodation in subdivided flats and bedspace apartments. As at end-September 2020, there were about 156 400 general applications for PRH, and about 103 600 non-elderly one-person applications under the Quota and Points System.

== Waitlist ==
In 1998, the government under Tung Chee-hwa pledged to reduce the average waiting time to 3 years by the year 2005.

The average waiting time for general applicants was 5.6 years. As of July 2021, the average waiting time had increased to 5.8 years, the longest average waiting time in more than 20 years, with more than 253,000 applicants on the waiting list. Frank Chan, Secretary for Transport and Housing, said that it might take up to 20 years to substantially reduce the waiting time.

== History ==
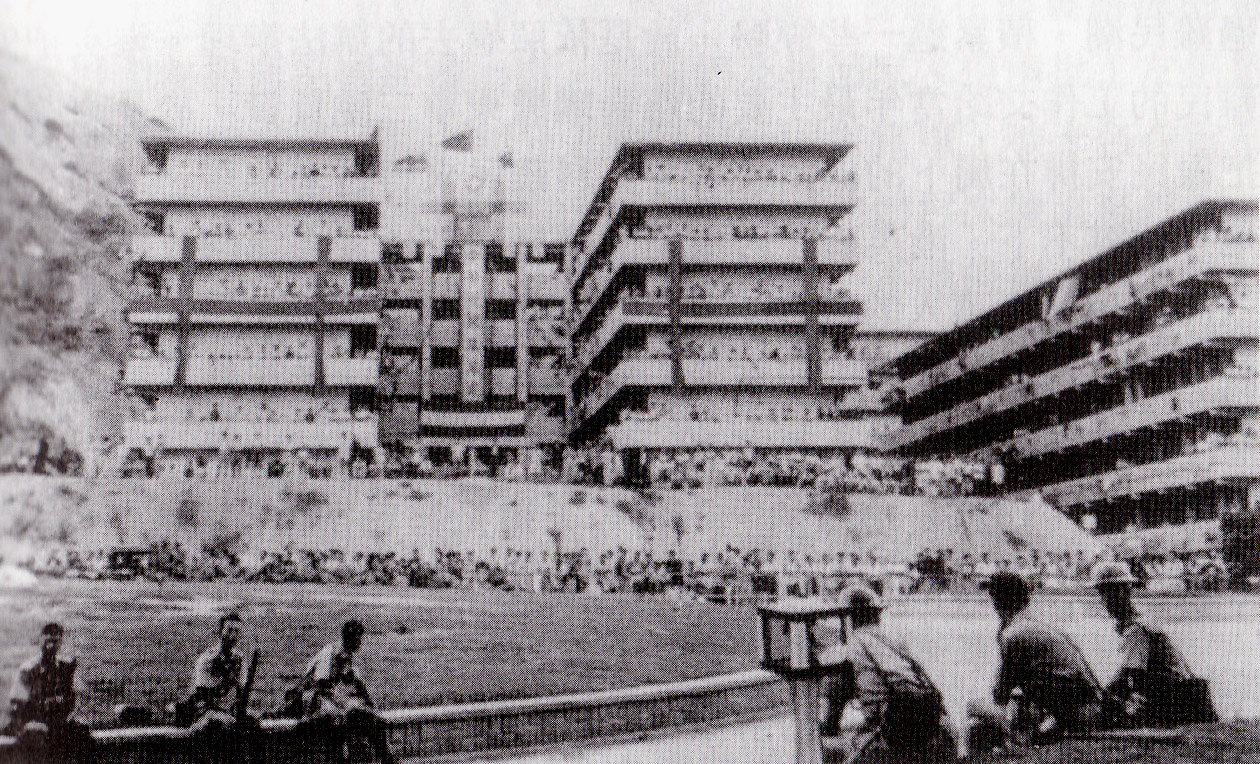
Mei Ho House of Shek Kip Mei Estate during the 1956 riots

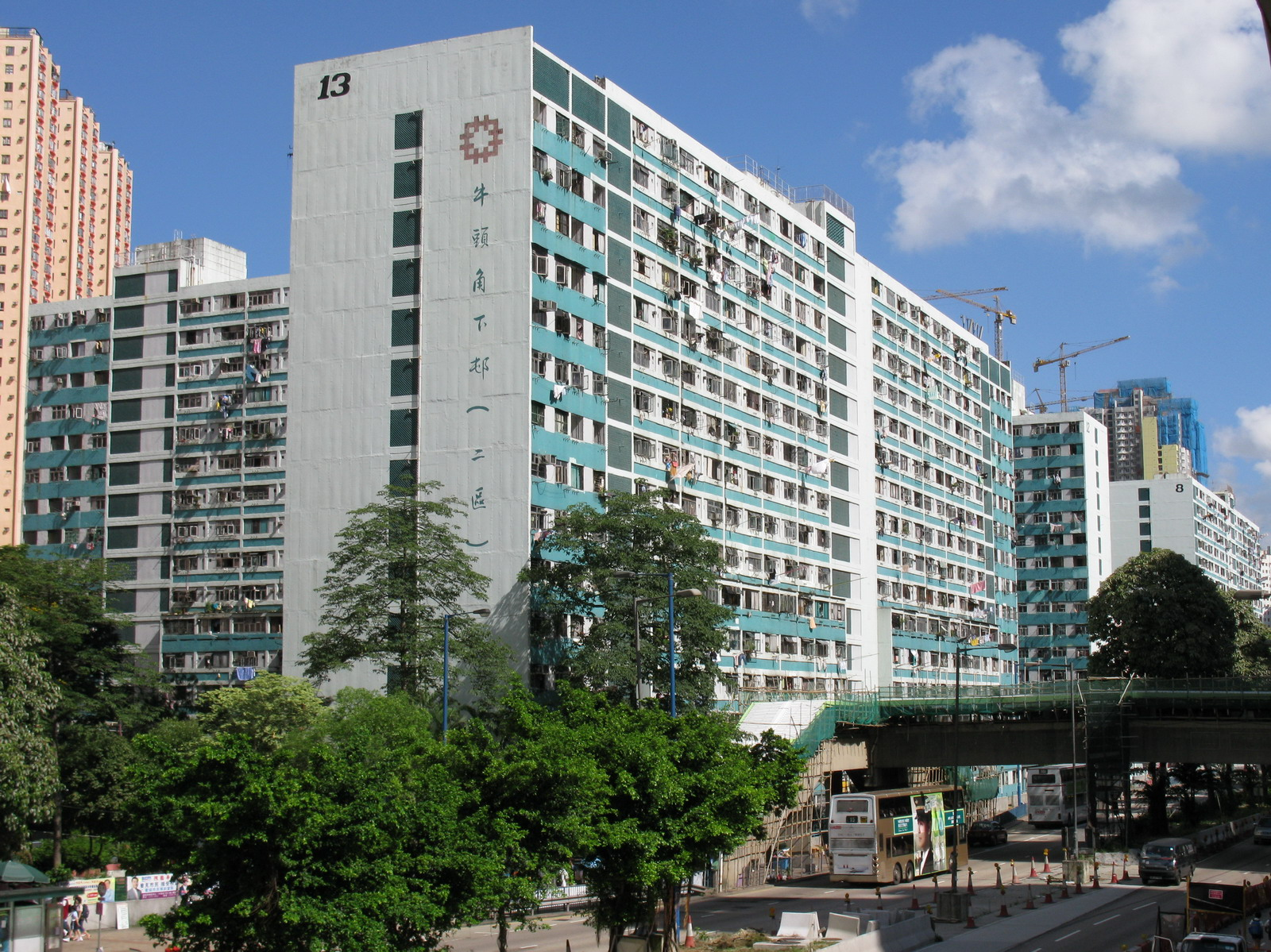
Lower Ngau Tau Kok (II) Estate, a rental public housing estate built in 1969

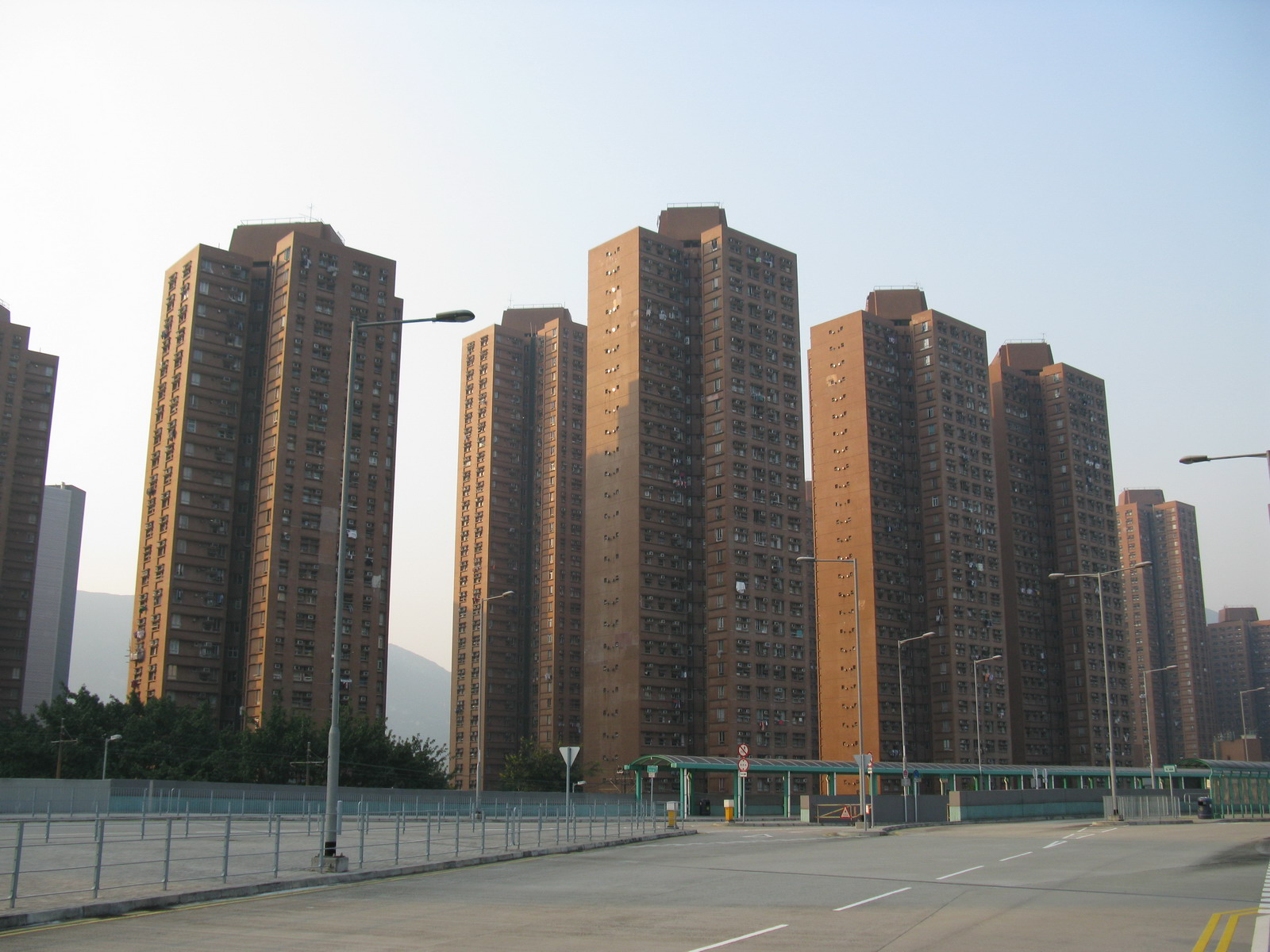
Siu Hong Court, an early Home Ownership Scheme housing estate built in 1982

In the 1920s and 1930s, many Mainland Chinese flooded into Hong Kong, resulting in a serious shortage of housing. Thus, in the Housing Committee Report of 1935, the colonial government proposed to build some low-cost housing for the public to solve this problem. However, as Hong Kong was facing an economic downturn at that time, the proposals were not implemented.

On 25 December 1953, a major fire in Shek Kip Mei destroyed the makeshift homes of refugees from Mainland China, leaving more than 50,000 people homeless. After the fire, and facing a surge of immigrant population, then governor Alexander Grantham launched a public housing program to introduce the idea of "multi-storey building" for the immigrant population living there, thus commencing a programme of mass public housing, providing affordable homes for those on low incomes. Some scholars have argued that the government has been overstating the role of the fire in the history of public housing in Hong Kong. For example, Faure argues that Grantham was concerned with introducing subsidised housing as early as 1949, but encountered opposition from Chinese members of the Legislative Council.

The Shek Kip Mei Estate, ready for occupation in 1954, was the first tangible manifestation of this policy. These resettlement blocks were built in the basic design of H-shape. In those early days, housing units were little more than small cubicles, and the original plan was to allocate 24 square feet (2.2 m^{2}) per adult and half that for each child under 12. However, they were in reality often occupied by more than one family, due to the extreme shortage of available housing. Facilities and sanitation were rudimentary and communal, like the bath rooms and laundry areas, were located in the cross bar of the "H", linked the residential wings on two sides. Rents were pitched at between HK$10 and 14, without caps on income. That year, the Resettlement Department was formed, as was the first Housing Authority (sometimes referred to as "former Housing Authority"), out of the Urban Council, through enactment of the 1954 Housing Ordinance. The demolition of the buildings of Shek Kip Mei Estate was started from 2007, and has now been extensively redeveloped. Today, all H-shaped resettlement blocks have had to be demolished, with only the Mei Ho House still standing.

In 1961, the "low-cost housing" scheme was introduced through the construction of 62,380 flats (capable of housing 363,000 people with monthly household incomes of no more than HK$600) in 18 estates, while HA accommodation would be available to those whose household incomes were between $900 and $1500.

In 1963, due to the rapid escalation of squatter numbers, squatters' eligibility for public housing was frozen, and future squatter areas came under licensing per the 1964 White Paper. The settlements of these squatters on the urban fringe were cleared in order to provide housing and industrial sites. With the formation of this ad hoc resettlement scheme, it later evolved into a policy tool to support the burgeoning manufacturing industry. The Housing Board was set up with the role of coordinating between agencies responsible for domestic housing. It made recommendations to have annual evaluations of supply and demand of housing, as well as increasing the minimum standard floor area per person to 35 sq ft (3.3 m^{2}).

Lower Ngau Tau Kok Estate, built between 1967 and 1970, was among the first group of resettlement estates built with lifts. All blocks were 16-floor high, and lifts from the ground floor could reach the 8th and the 13th floors.

In 1973, the Government of Hong Kong announced a ten-year plan for the public provision of housing, to provide everyone in Hong Kong with permanent, self-contained housing with a target of housing. The objective was to provide 1.8 million people with "satisfactory accommodation". The Government saw as its responsibility to provide accessible housing for "the poor" – defined as those whose monthly household income was between HK$2,100 (for a family of 3) and HK$3,150 (for a family of 10).

In 1975, the Government officially opened the Oi Man Estate. The blocks were built in twin-tower layout with two square blocks interlocked together. There were sixteen large and small units on each floor of the block, and each flat with its own kitchen and toilet inside. The housing estate was also built on a concept of "a little town within a city". The estate of 6,200 flats, constructed on a site of 21 acres (85,000 m^{2}) and capable of housing 46,000 people, offered a self-contained environment complete with commercial amenities ranging from markets and barber shops to banks. This represented an innovation in that the commercial premises would serve the local estate, while paying a rent determined by public tender. Banks, restaurants, and other large premises would be let out on a five-year contract, competing on a monthly rental offered, while tenants for smaller premises would compete on premium paid based on fixed monthly rentals. Unlike the generations of housing estates which preceded it, there would be designated market stalls and cooked-food stalls. Street vendors would be no longer be tolerated.

In 1980, the government launched the first batch of public housing in the Home Ownership Scheme, thereby allowing low-income families to own their homes for the first time.

A new town to be constructed on 240 hectares of reclaimed fishponds and wetland was conceived in 1987 to house 140,000 people. Since Tin Shui Wai was entirely a virgin development, it was conceived with wider walkways and larger open areas when compared to other urban developments in Hong Kong.

A 1988 crime survey reported that crime rates were lower in the public housing estates of Hong Kong than in private housing areas.

== Supply target ==
The government sets a Long Term Housing Strategy every year, which plans housing units for the next 10 years. In 2014, the government's target for public and subsidized flats vs private housing units was set at 60% and 40%. In 2018, the target was changed to 70% public and 30% private. Under that ratio, the government projected 450,000 total flats to be developed in the 10 years after 2018, with 315,000 to be public, and 135,000 to be private.

SCMP noted that these were only targets, and that "Since 2014, the government has never hit its target of building enough public flats. The public housing units provided in the past four years only accounted for 47 per cent of the actual number of homes built, falling short of the 60 per cent target." Additionally, a member of the Democratic Party stated that without increasing land supply, the government would continue to fall short of its target.

In December 2020, Secretary for Transport and Housing Frank Chan announced that the next target would be 430,000 total units over the next 10 years, down from the 450,000 target specified in 2018. This means an annual target of 43,000 total units, with the same 70% public and 30% private target ratio.

In July 2021, Adam Kwok Kai-fai, an executive of Sun Hung Kai Properties, suggested that the 10 year targets did not have accountability, and that officials should set up a committee to oversee progress towards meeting the 10 year targets, with a government official held accountable if the targets were not met.

== Types ==
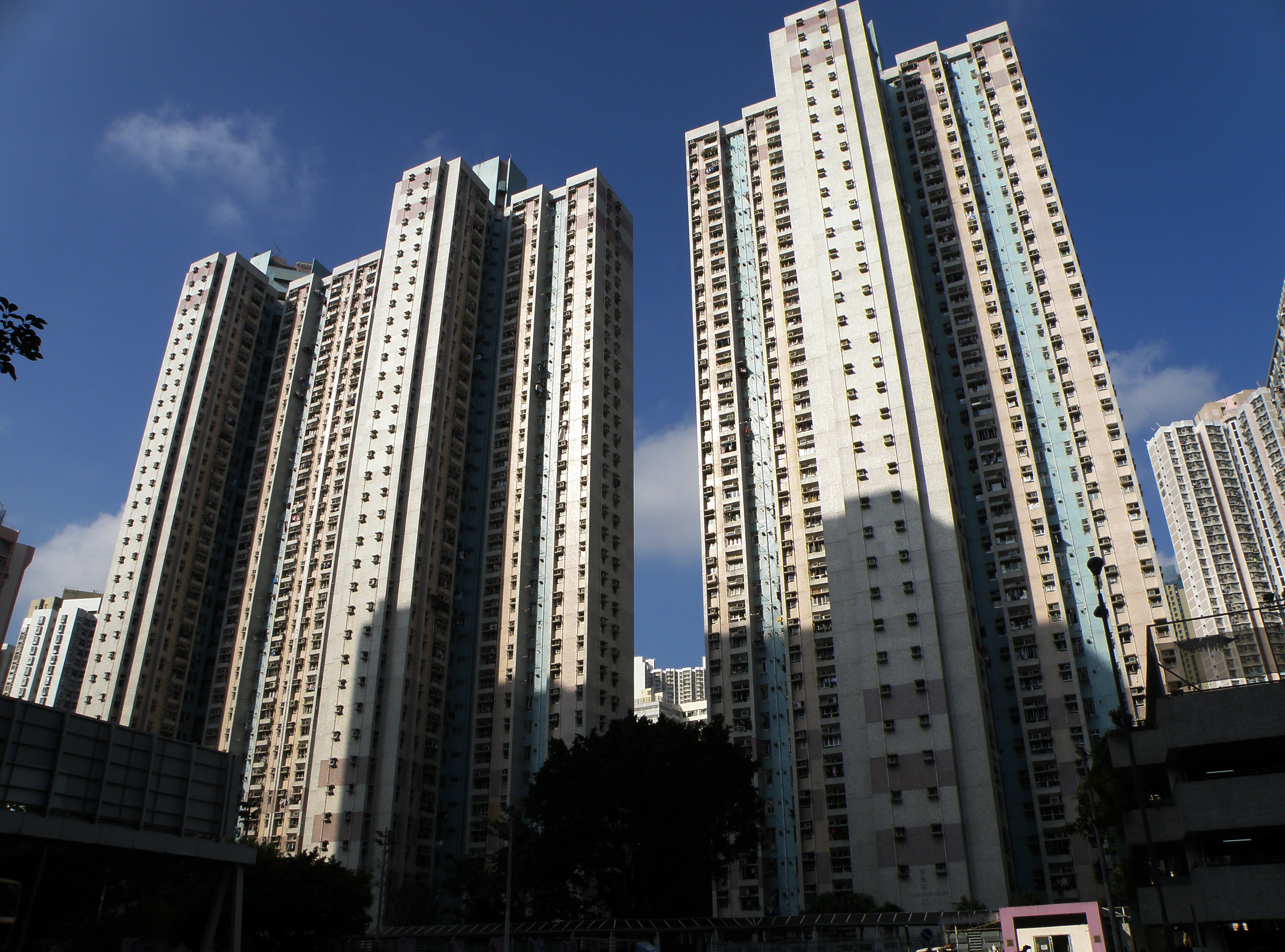
Kwai Chun Court, a Home Ownership Scheme housing estate in Kwai Chung built in 1995

Public housing estates in Hong Kong may be rented or sold under various government subsidy programmes, and are generally subject to a range of restrictions and eligibility requirements. They also vary in scale, and are built and managed under the responsibility of the Hong Kong Housing Authority and the Hong Kong Housing Society. According to the 2006 census, 3.3 million people or 48.8 percent of the population of Hong Kong lived in rental or subsidised-sale public housing; within that group, 31 percent lived in public rental housing, 17.1 percent lived in Housing Authority subsidised-sale flats and 0.7 percent lived in Housing Society subsidised-sale flats. For 2024 records, see here: 30.5% lived in public rental housing, 15.6% lived in subsidized home ownership housing, and 0.9% lived in temporary housing.

- Public Rental Housing estates are the most numerous type of public housing estates, and are rented at discounted rates to low-income residents. They may be managed by either the Hong Kong Housing Authority or the Hong Kong Housing Society. Low-income eligibility criteria for public rental and subsidised-sale flats vary between families, the elderly and individual applicants.
- Home Ownership Scheme estates are subsidised-sale public housing estates for low-income residents, usually built adjacent to or within Public Rental Housing and nearly identical in construction. They are managed by the Hong Kong Housing Authority and are earmarked for sale to low-income qualifiers at prices which are heavily discounted from market value, and the land value is similarly subsidised. The mortgage and resale of these units in the second-hand market are likewise restricted to eligible low-income residents. Within a public housing estate development, some blocks may be designated by the Authority exclusively for rental while others may be earmarked for sale.
- Tenants Purchase Scheme allows existing tenants in the rented public housing estates of the Hong Kong Housing Authority to purchase their flats. As in the Home Ownership Scheme, the sale prices are set much lower than the market prices of private flats due to subsidies and restriction on selling. The Flat-for-Sale Scheme was managed by Hong Kong Housing Society and operates in a similar manner as the Tenants Purchase Scheme and the Home Ownership Scheme, making flats available for sale at concessionary prices.
- Flat-for-Sale Scheme (Chinese: 住宅發售計劃) is a housing development scheme by Hong Kong Housing Society in 1980s. The flats under the scheme are for sale at concessionary price. It is similar to Home Ownership Scheme by Hong Kong Housing Authority. The first of such estate was Clague Garden Estate in Tsuen Wan.

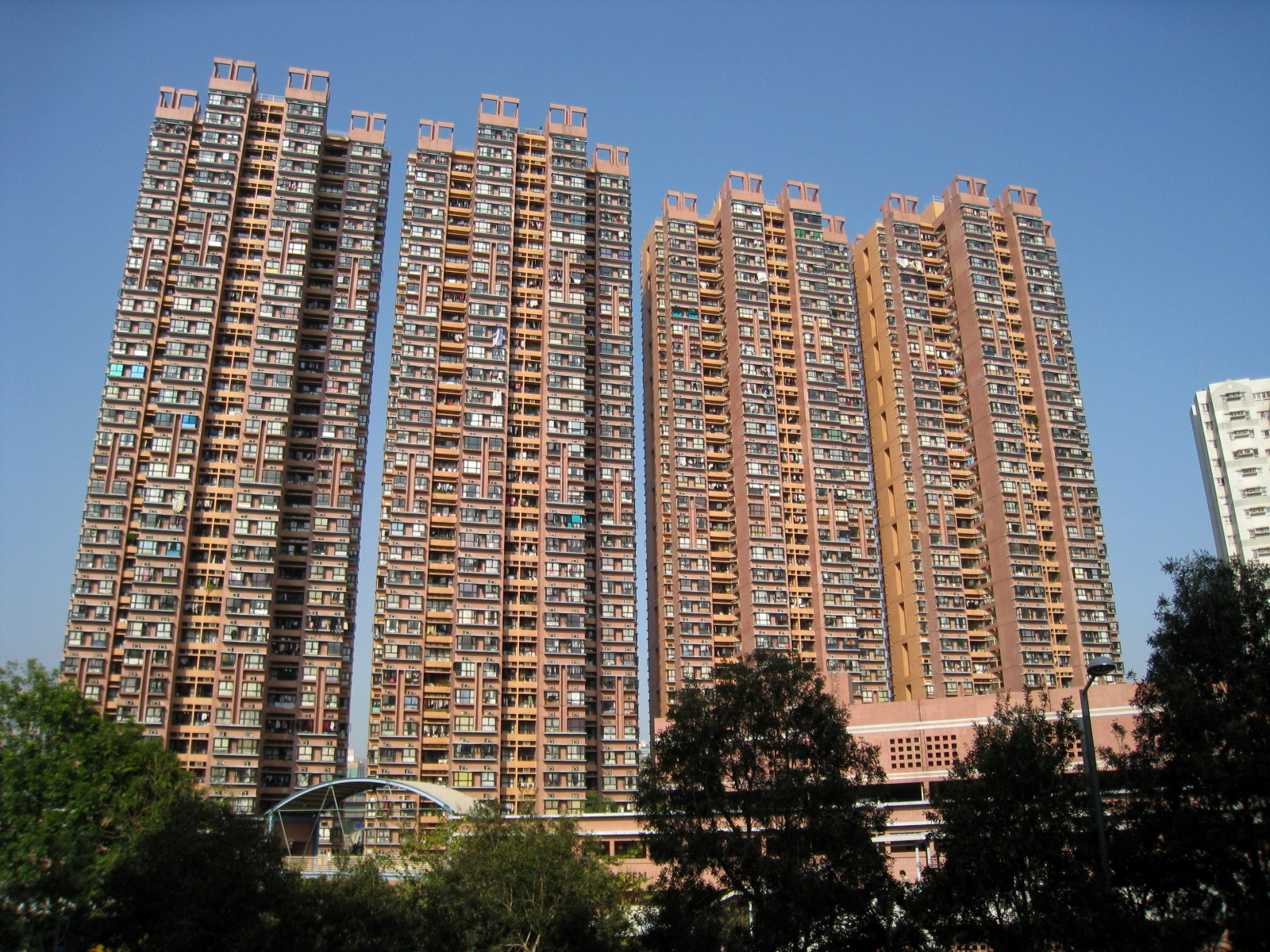
Tivoli Garden, a Sandwich Class Housing Scheme estate built in 1996

- Sandwich Class Housing Scheme estates were built for sale to lower-middle and middle-income residents, known as the sandwich class, who did not qualify for low-income public housing in the Home Ownership Scheme but still had trouble affording private housing. Managed by the Hong Kong Housing Society, the quality and market positioning of Sandwich Class Housing were significantly higher than public housing estates and comparable to some middle-class private developments. These units were sold at levels that were slightly below market value and came with a five-year resale restriction. Construction of Sandwich Class Housing Scheme estates ended in 2000 due to changes in the housing market.
- Interim Housing is temporary public rental housing for those who are awaiting placement into public housing estates or are not immediately eligible for flats in public housing estates. Interim Housing often accommodates residents who have been displaced by disaster, fire, redevelopment or other reasons. Some of the housing reuse old blocks in public housing estates while others use pre-fabricated building components.
- Green Form Subsidised Home Ownership Pilot Scheme (GSH) flats are exclusively catered for Green Form applicants, where the site for development is identified among the public rental housing estates. The prices for the flats under the scheme are set below those of Home Ownership Scheme flats.

== Designs ==
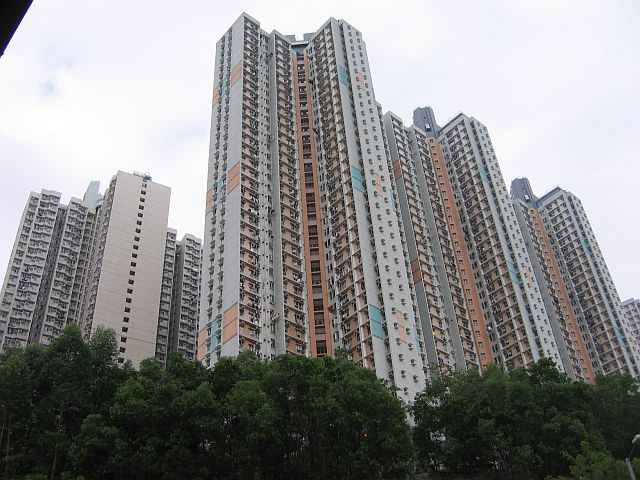
Po Tat Estate, a Public Rental Housing estate based on the New Cruciform design

Several designs have been used for the blocks of the public housing estates, including:

- Old Slab (Mark VII, Seven-Storey Block, Standard Type A, 23 sq meters Design, 27 sq meters Design, 54 sq meters Design, Special Edition), New Slab
- Single H, Double H, Triple H
- Single Tower, Twin Tower
- Single I, Double I, Triple I
- Harmony 1, 1A, 2, 3,Rural,New Harmony 1,3
- Linear 1, 3, L, B
- Trident 1, 2, 3, 4
- Mark I, II, III, IV, V, VI
- Cruciform, New Cruciform
- Concord
- Ziggurat
- Rural Housing
- Non Standard
- Converted Block

== Residential units and population ==
According to the Cooperate Profile from Hong Kong Housing Authority in September 2014 and Hong Kong Housing Society info bank in June 2015:

Type	Managed by	Units	Population	Population %
Public Rental Housing	Hong Kong Housing Authority	749400	2022000	28%
Public Rental Housing	Hong Kong Housing Society	31279	82095	1.1%
Flat-for-sale Scheme	Hong Kong Housing Society	10360	20875	0.28%
Sandwich Class Housing Scheme	Hong Kong Housing Society	8920	14760	0.2%

The Government updated the long term housing supply target to 480 000 units for the ten-year period from 2015/16 to 2024/25. Among them, the target for PRH is 200 000 flats while that for subsidised sale flats (mainly HOS flats) is 90 000 units.

== Notable estates ==
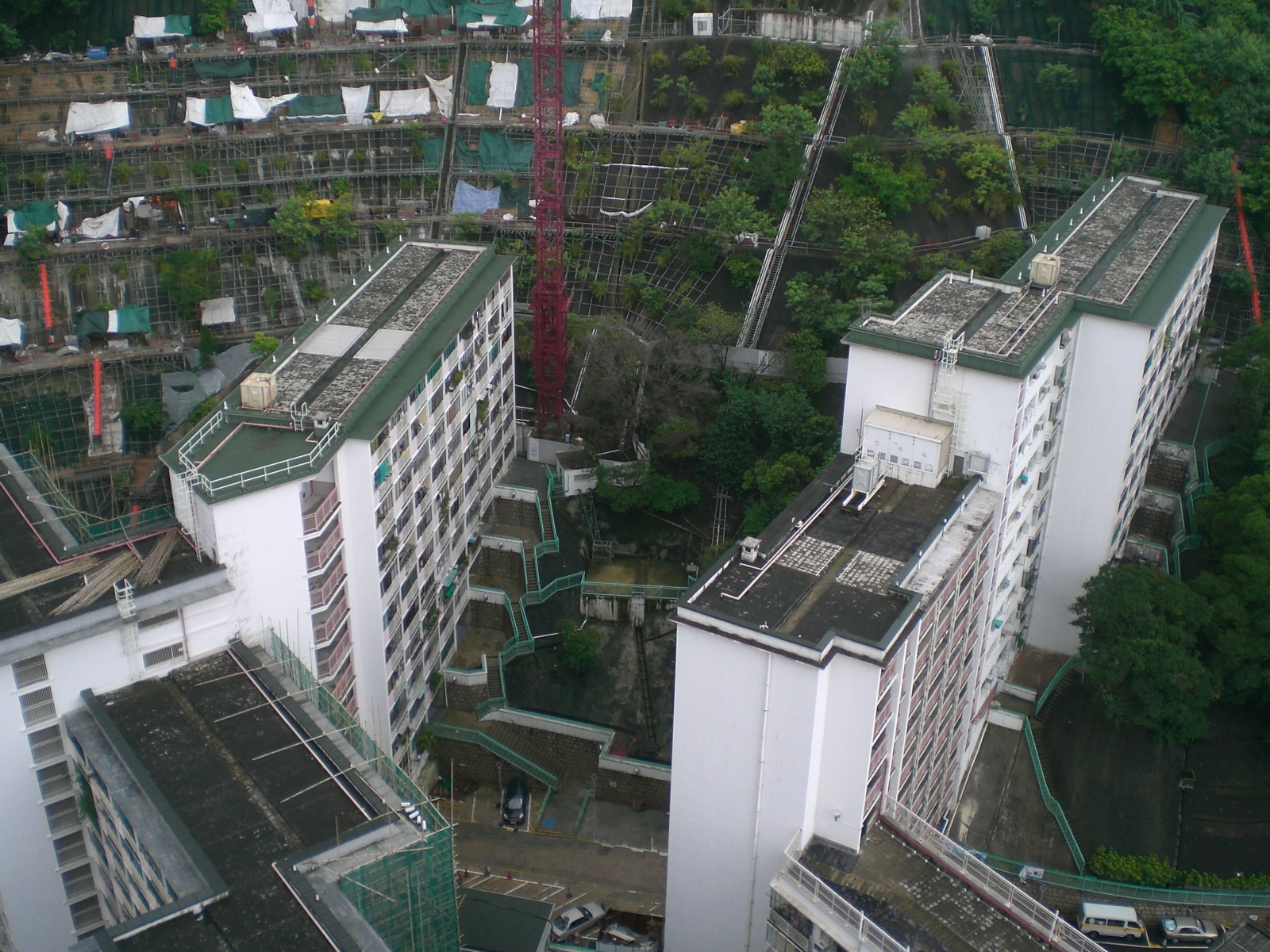
Sai Wan Estate, built in 1958, is of the Old Slab design

The following is a list of selected public housing estates and their specificities:

- Shek Kip Mei Estate was the first public housing estate in Hong Kong. All the blocks from the 1950s have been demolished, except Block 41 Mei Ho House, the last remaining example of the "Mark I" building in a single-block configuration. Block 41 has been graded as "Grade I historic building".
- Model Housing Estate is the oldest existing public housing estate in Hong Kong, with blocks built in 1952 still in use.
- Sai Wan Estate, built in 1958, is the only public housing estate in Central and Western District developed by the Hong Kong Housing Authority.
- Ming Wah Dai Ha, built between 1962 and 1978, is the oldest existing public housing estate developed by the Hong Kong Housing Society.
- Lower Ngau Tau Kok (II) Estate, completed in 1967 and demolished in 2010. Its upcoming disappearance attracted many visitors, to the point that tenants have complained about the nuisance.
- Sha Tau Kok Chuen consists of 51 blocks completed between 1988 and 1991. It is the public housing estate with most number of blocks in Hong Kong.
- Tivoli Garden, completed in 1996, was the first development under the Sandwich Class Housing Scheme.
- Kwai Chung Estate, redeveloped between 1997 and 2008, it is the largest public housing estate in Hong Kong. It comprises 13,700 apartments in 16 blocks, and houses over 36,000 people.

Several public housing estates have received awards from the Hong Kong Institute of Architects:

- 1965: Choi Hung Estate – Silver Medal
- 1981: Sui Wo Court – Silver Medal
- 1981: Cho Yiu Chuen – Certificate of Merit
- 1982: Mei Lam Estate Phase 1 – Certificate of Merit
- 1985: Siu Hong Court – Silver Medal
- 1987: Mei Lam Indoor Recreation Centre – Silver Medal
- 1989: Heng On Estate – Certificate of Merit
- 1991: Clague Garden Estate – Certificate of Merit
- 1992: Kwong Yuen Estate Commercial Centre – Certificate of Merit
- 1998: Verbena Heights – Silver Medal

== See also ==
- Hong Kong Housing Authority Exhibition Centre
- Housing Department
- My Home Purchase Plan
- Secretary for Housing, Planning and Lands, a former governmental position, in charge of public housing
- Types of public housing estate blocks in Hong Kong
- Pet policy in public housing estates in Hong Kong
