= Society for the Prevention of Cruelty to Animals (Hong Kong) =

Charity

- 香港愛護動物協會
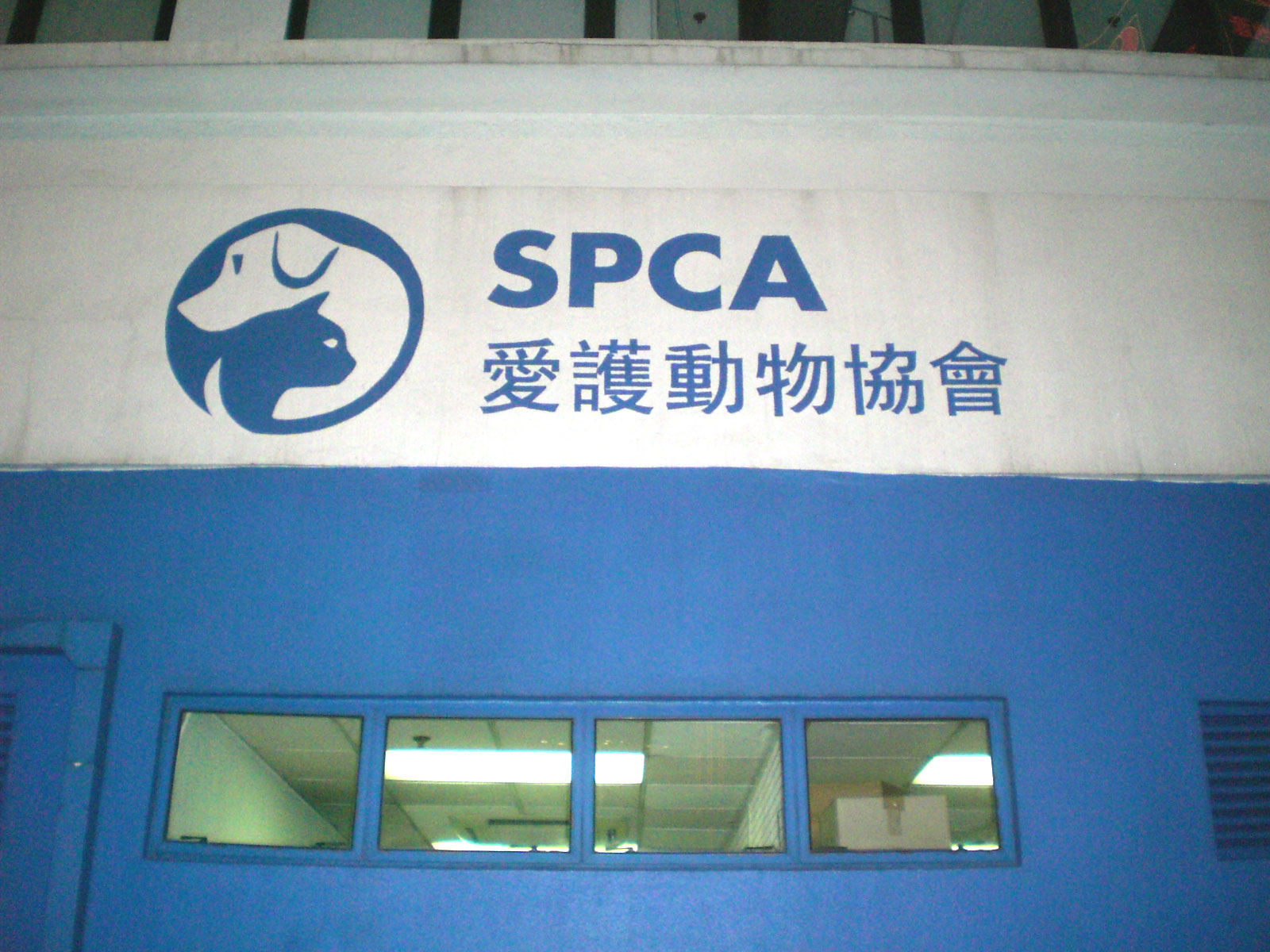
- SPCA logo on the side of one of the service centres
- Abbreviation: SPCA
- Formation: 1903; 123 years ago
- Founded at: British Hong Kong
- Type: Charity
- Purpose: Animal welfare
- Headquarters: 5 Wan Shing Street, Wan Chai
- Location: Hong Kong
- President: Gigi Fu
- Chairman: Joanna Eades
- Website: Official website

Society for the Prevention of Cruelty to Animals
- Traditional Chinese: 香港愛護動物協會
- Simplified Chinese: 香港爱护动物协会
- Cantonese Yale: Hēung góng oi wuh duhng maht hip wúi
- Jyutping: Hoeng1 gong2 oi3 wu6 dung6 mat6 hip3 wui2
Transcriptions
Standard Mandarin
- Hanyu Pinyin: Xiānggǎng Àihù Dòngwù Xiéhuì
Yue: Cantonese
- Yale Romanization: Hēung góng oi wuh duhng maht hip wúi
- Jyutping: Hoeng1 gong2 oi3 wu6 dung6 mat6 hip3 wui2

The Hongkong Society for the Prevention of Cruelty to Animals
- Traditional Chinese: 香港防止虐待禽畜會
- Simplified Chinese: 香港防止虐待禽畜会
- Jyutping: Hoeng1 gong2 fong4 zi2 joek6 doi6 kam4 cuk1 wui2
Transcriptions
Standard Mandarin
- Hanyu Pinyin: Xiānggǎng Fángzhǐ Nüèdài Qínchù Huì
Yue: Cantonese
- Jyutping: Hoeng1 gong2 fong4 zi2 joek6 doi6 kam4 cuk1 wui2

The Society for the Prevention of Cruelty to Animals (SPCA; Chinese: 香港愛護動物協會) is a registered charity to promote animal welfare in Hong Kong, with outreach services to China.

== History ==
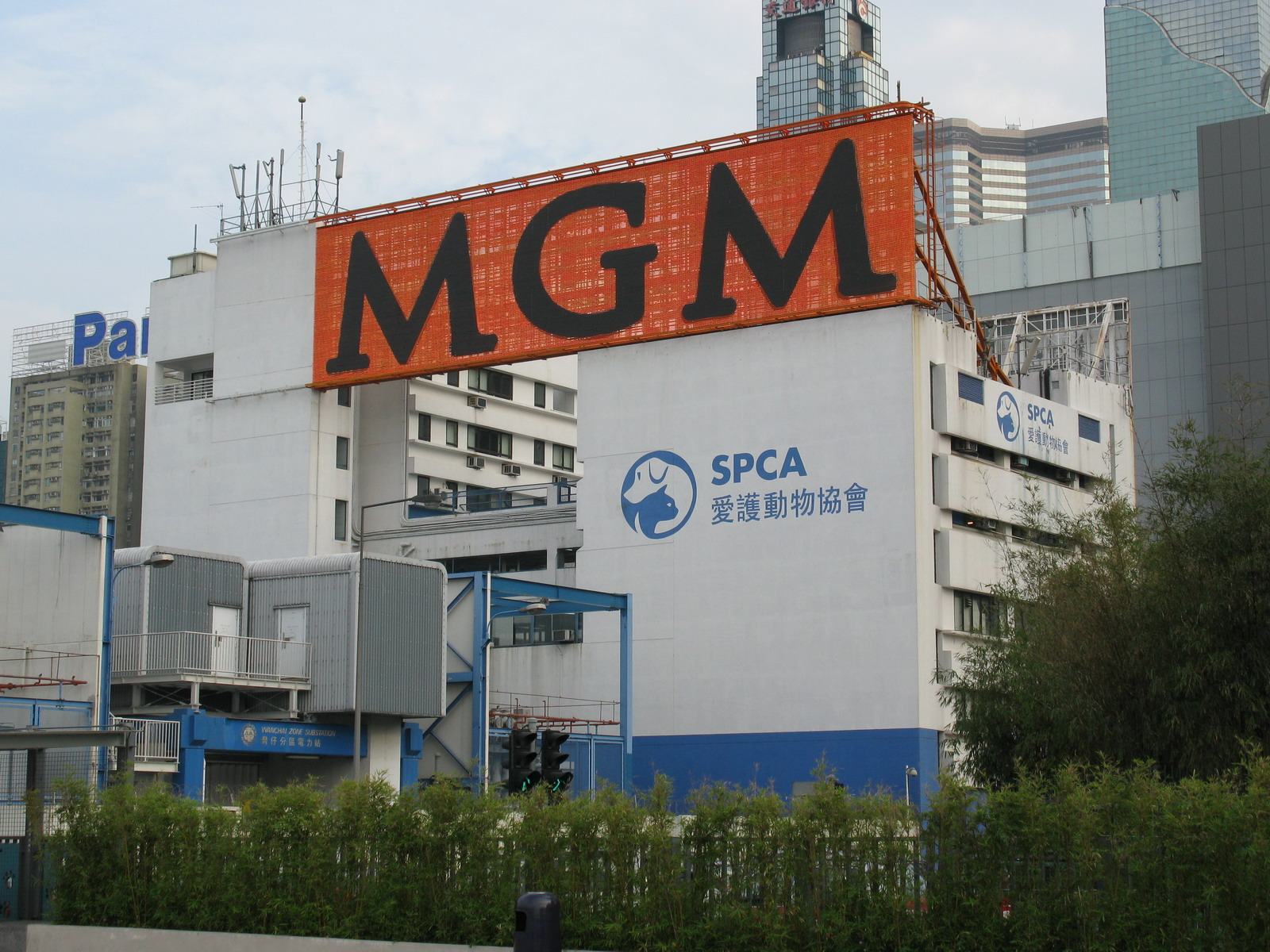
Building of the Society for the Prevention of Cruelty to Animals (Hong Kong)

The organisation was the first charity in Hong Kong to deal with a full range of animal welfare concerns. It was founded by a group of volunteers in 1903 as The Hongkong Society for the Prevention of Cruelty to Animals (香港防止虐待禽畜會), who operated it mainly on a volunteer basis. Activities were suspended in 1914 due to the outbreak of World War I. It was re-established in 1921, with the governor Reginald Edward Stubbs as president and patron.

In 1922, the SPCA's first Dog's Home opened on Waterloo Road, Kowloon. Following the loss of that site in 1934, a new expanded boarding kennel was opened in Kowloon City, which housed many animals left by people fleeing the area during the Second World War.

The society's first veterinary clinic opened in Kowloon in 1953. An expanded animal clinic offering free services to pet owners was opened in the 1960s. The first mobile vet clinic was offered in 1987.

In the 1950s, cat boxes were introduced as places for people to leave unwanted cats and kittens. The cat box locations were expanded in 1970. In 2000, the organisation took a different approach, pioneering the Cat Colony Care Programme in Asia involving trap-neuter-return. In 2014, the society reported on its website that 5,000 cats' lives are ended annually in its care and that of the Agriculture, Fisheries and Conservation Department, a reduction from 40,000 in 1963.

In 2012, the Barking Lot Cafe (Stanley Adoption Centre) opened in Stanley.

== Renaming ==
In 1978, the society was formally named The Royal Society for the Prevention of Cruelty to Animals, Hong Kong (皇家香港防止虐畜會). In 1989, its Chinese name was again renamed as 皇家香港愛護動物協會. In 1995, due to the handover of Hong Kong, members voted at an annual general meeting to drop the prefix "Royal" from the society's name, with the new name going into effect on 1 January 1997.

== Mission ==
The society's mission is "to curb cruelty to animals, to protect their health and welfare, to prevent cruelty and through education, to inspire in the community a deep respect for life so that all living creatures may live together in harmony."

== Current structure ==
The society is run by an executive committee elected by members who provide veterinary services and fund-raising programmes to support the organisation economically.

The current president of The SPCA (HK) is the former TVB actress, Gigi Fu (傅明憲). The patron of the society is the wife of Hong Kong's former chief executive CY Leung, Mrs. Regina Leung.

The SPCA (HK)'s headquarters is in Wan Chai at Hong Kong Island. Other SPCA (HK) centers are located in Pok Fu Lam, Ho Man Tin, Mong Kok, Sai Kung, Cheung Chau, Mui Wo and Hang Hau to provide veterinary and homing services for animals in need.

== Campaigns ==
Some of the campaigns underway include:

=== Ban shark fin soup ===
Focusing on the cruelty involved in the finning and killing of over 70 million sharks per year, the organisation joined with other ocean conservation groups to call for the end of the shark finning trade. The society took part in canvassing hotels and clubs, calling for them to drop shark's fin soup from their menus. As a result, two leading hotels dropped the soup from their menus, and the airline Cathay Pacific agreed to cease shipping unsustainable sharks fin products across all their airline routes.

=== More public areas for dogs ===
The society is working to increase access to public areas for pets, which are very limited in Hong Kong. "Ideally, we would like to see all public spaces open to pets, the idea being that every pet owner is within a 15 minute walk of a public space in which to exercise their dog." The society is working to increase awareness of the benefits to both animals and their guardians, and to develop a strategic plan.

=== TNR programme for stray dogs and cats ===
With the successful experience of the trap-neuter-return programme for free-roaming cats, the society has lobbied for a similar programme to be tried for stray dogs. In 2012, local governments in three proposed locations for trials voted against the measures. The organisation continues to search for suitable TNR trial locations.

=== End the seal hunt ===
The society is campaigning alongside other animal welfare groups to ban the seal hunt in Canada. Following a ban of the products by the European Economic Community, Canada announced an agreement to sell seal meat to China. The SPCA(HK) is working to ban the products in Hong Kong. "By banning seal products in Hong Kong, we will not only be closing the market here, but also have a knock-on effect on China and Asia, and send a clear message to the Canadian government." In 2014, Canadian officials reported that the government of China backed away from the deal to buy seal meat after pressure from animal welfare groups.

== Financial information ==
Table 1 Net revenue for the year

HK$ million	2008	2007
Veterinary services	6.0	6.1
Fundraising activities	7.1	6.6
Member services	4.3	4.3
Welfare and community support services	(22.5)	(19.0)
Donation	3.4	3.9
Advertising and other income	8.6	4.1
Interest income	1.5	1.5
Administrative costs	(1.8)	(1.8)
Surplus for the year	6.6	5.7

== Animal welfare programmes ==
- Inspectorate

Responsible for the rescue and collection of stray or injured animals. Investigates suspected animal cruelty cases jointly with the Hong Kong Police Force and The Agriculture, Fisheries and Conservation Department under the Animal Watch Scheme.

- Education

Organise school visits and exhibition in shopping malls to spread the message of compassion, respect and care for animals. In 2007–08 289 talks were given to young people reaching 20,004 audiences. The SPCA website is also committed to educating the public on how to look after pets responsibly. Vet's Corner and the Treasure of Knowledge pages are full of useful information such as what to do if your pet becomes ill.

- Homing and adoption

Vaccinate, treat and find new homes for abandoned animals. In year 2007 to 2008, 2904 animals were successfully adopted. Animals who can not be adopted after a certain time may have to be put down.

- Fostering

Look for foster parents for puppies and kittens which are too young to leave their mothers. Foster parents generally look after the young animals until a permanent home can be found.

- Surrenders

The SPCA (HK) has a policy of Responsible Pet Ownership (RPO) as a solution to reduce the overpopulation of abandoned animals. Surrender can only be done in office hours, so that the SPCA (HK) staff can try to ascertain the reason for the surrender.

- Behaviour Training

Offers training programmes, including Puppy Socialisation Training and Basic Obedience Training.

- Homing Hearing Dog Programme

Assign hearing dog to the people in need, they serve as their ears and eyes.

- Pet care services

Includes boarding services, grooming, and veterinary services. Provide regular veterinary services to their member's companion animals at static clinics and the mobile clinic vehicle. Special veterinary services include "Weight Management Clinics" and "Wellness Clinics" for animals in need. According to the Annual Report 04–05, 64,969 animals had been given veterinary treatment from their clinics during that year.

- SNAP - Spay Neuter Assistance Programme

Assistance is available to residents of Hong Kong who cannot afford to spay or neuter their pets.

== Controversy ==
The SPCA (HK)'s policy on animal euthanasia has long been controversial among animal lovers and pet owners. According to the SPCA (HK)'s annual report, 4128 animals were put down by the society in 2007 to 08.

In November 2013, about 20 activists protested outside the society's Wan Chai headquarters, accusing the society of abandoning its mission: "The SPCA should try harder to save animals under its care, such as appealing to animal lovers through social media, before taking that final step to conduct euthanasia," stated one protester, who took issue with about half of the 10,000 abandoned animals the SPCA receives each year being euthanised.

== Publications ==
Pawprints(足印) is a quarterly newsletter published by the SPCA (HK). Its contents range from the SPCA (HK) news and announcements to international news concerning animal welfare. Interviews with the SPCA (HK) staff and vets are also featured. The public can go to their official website to read the past issues of Pawprints.

== See also ==
- Animal Rights
- Cruelty to animals
- Humane Society
- Overpopulation (animals)
