= So Kwun Wat (constituency) =

Constituency in Tuen Mun District

- 掃管笏
- Elected constituency for the Tuen Mun District Council
- Boundary of So Kwun Wat in Tuen Mun District
- District: Tuen Mun
- Legislative Council constituency: New Territories North West
- Population: 13,828 (2019)
- Electorate: 4,180 (2019)

Current constituency
- Created: 2019
- Number of members: One
- Member: Vacant
- Created from: Hanford, Sam Shing

So Kwun Wat (Chinese: 掃管笏) is one of the 31 constituencies in the Tuen Mun District.

Created for the 2019 District Council elections, the constituency returns one district councillor to the Tuen Mun District Council, with an election every four years.

So Kwun Wat loosely covers areas like Siu Lam and So Kwun Wat. It has projected population of 13,828.

== Councillors represented ==
Election	Member	Party
2019	Ma Kee→Vacant (Note: Resigned.)	Democratic

== Election results ==
=== 2010s ===
Tuen Mun District Council Election, 2019: So Kwun Wat
Party	Candidate	Votes	%	±%
Democratic	Ma Kee	1,648	53.23	
NPP	Jeremy Chan Ka-ching	982	31.72	
Roundtable	Peter Lau Kai-man	466	15.05	
Majority		666	21.52	
Turnout		3,105	74.28	
Democratic win (new seat)				
