= Sam Shing =

Sam Shing may refer to:

- Sam Shing Hui, a former fishing village in Tuen Mun, Hong Kong
- Sam Shing Estate, a public housing estate in Tuen Mun, Hong Kong
- Sam Shing stop, an MTR Light Rail stop adjacent to the estate
