= Golden Beach (Hong Kong) =

Beach in Tuen Mun, New Territories, Hong Kong

Coordinates: 22°22′14″N 113°59′20″E

- Beach
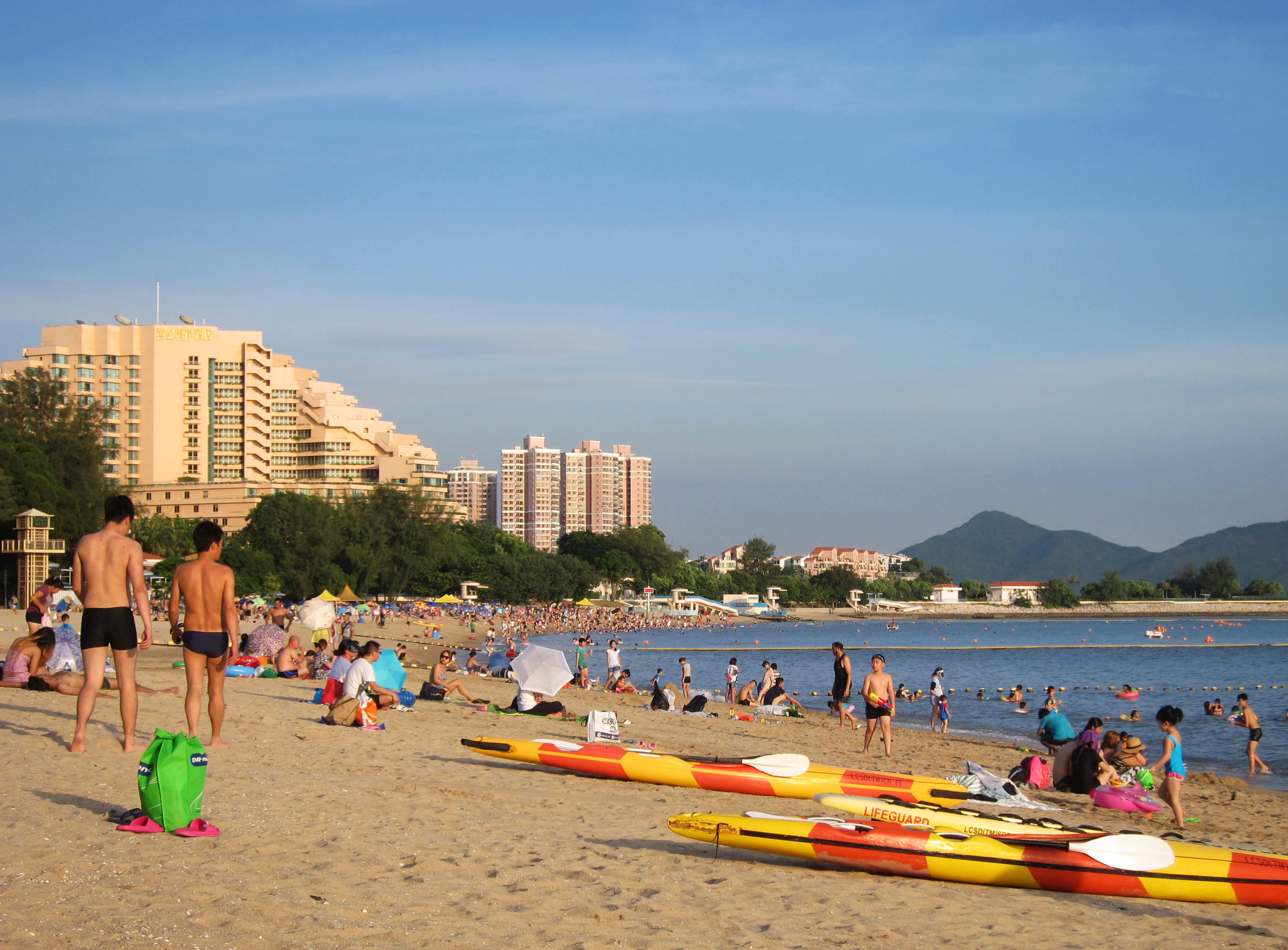
- Golden Beach (background) viewed from Cafeteria New Beach in 2017

- Location within Hong Kong
- Location: So Kwun Wat, New Territories, Hong Kong

Dimensions
  - Length: 550 metres (1,800 ft) (approx.)
- Patrolled by: Leisure and Cultural Services Department
- Access: Castle Peak Road

Golden Beach (Chinese: 黃金泳灘) is located at 18 1/2 miles of Castle Peak Road in So Kwun Wat, New Territories, Hong Kong. It is contiguous with the adjacent Cafeteria New Beach‌ and Cafeteria Old Beach to its northwest.

Golden Beach is the largest public beach in Tuen Mun District with a total area of 78,500 m^{2} (845,000 sq ft) and a length of 545 metres (1,788 ft). The water quality is usually classified as Grade 2 (Fair). Tropical trees, like coconut, and flowers of various species are planted on both sides of a 480-metre-long (1,570 ft) promenade running parallel to the beach. Refreshment kiosks, a hotel, and a shopping centre are located adjacent to the beach.

There is a volleyball court at the beach, which is a unique feature amongst the beaches of Hong Kong. The Hong Kong national beach volleyball team occasionally practise on Golden Beach.

== History ==
Golden Beach was one of the first artificial beaches constructed in Hong Kong, following the private beach at Tai Pak in Discovery Bay. It was built in 1994 using about 74,000 cubic metres (2,600,000 cu ft) of sand. It opened to the public in 1995, originally under the management of the Regional Council.

In 2000, management of the beach was transferred to the newly formed Leisure and Cultural Services Department (LCSD).

== Features ==
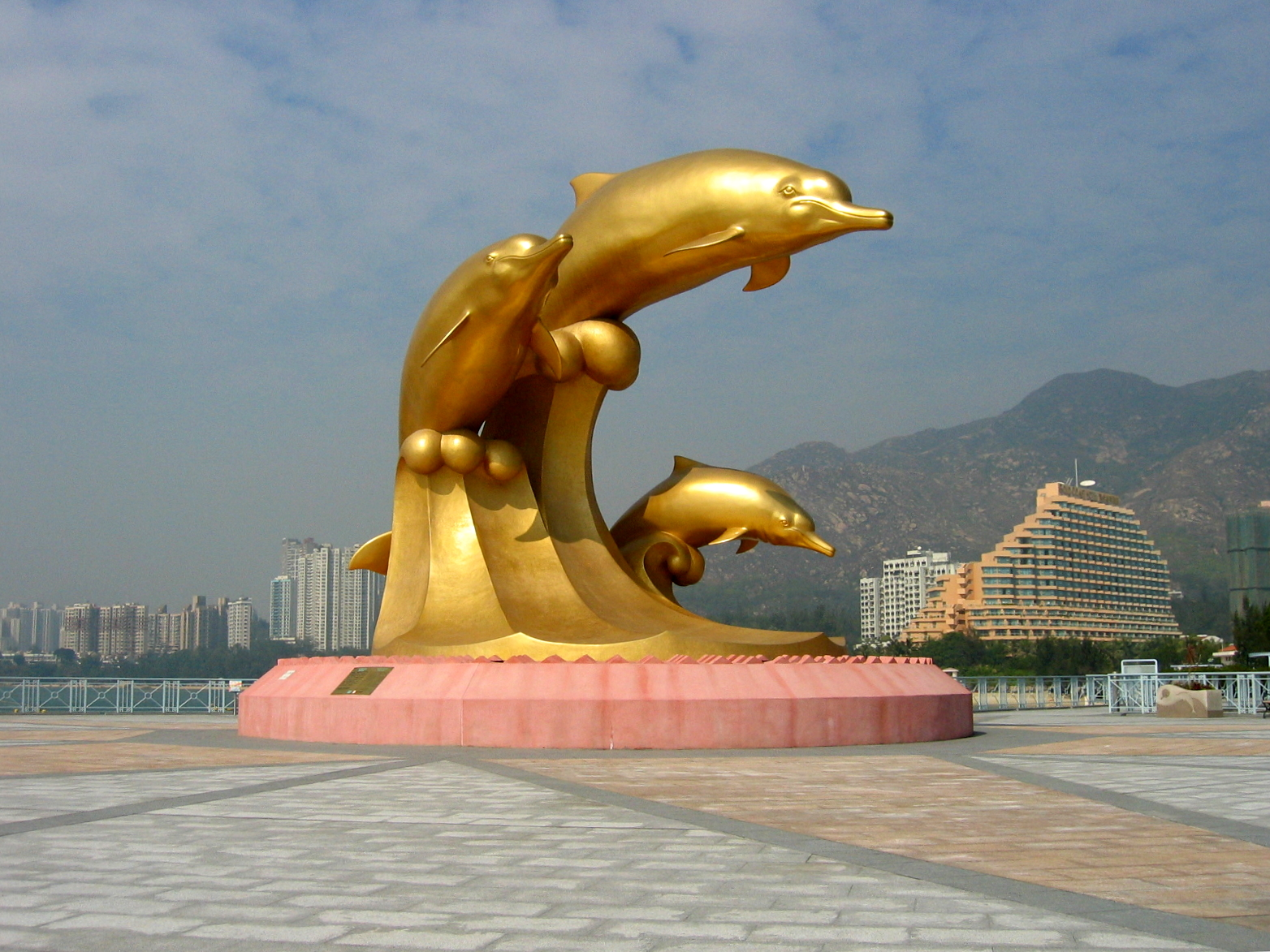
Dolphin Square, near the beach

- Changing rooms and showers
- Dolphin Square
- Restaurant
- Seaside promenade
- Toilets
- Tuck shop

== Patronage ==
Golden Beach is the busiest of the six gazetted beaches in Tuen Mun District. In 2016, according to the LCSD, it had an average attendance of 1,941 on weekdays, 4,438 on weekends and holidays, and 670,350 during the bathing season. This makes it one of the most well-attended beaches in Hong Kong, behind only Repulse Bay, Shek O, and Clear Water Bay Second beaches.

== Environmental issues ==
=== Marine refuse ===
Like many other beaches in Hong Kong, Golden Beach suffers from a worsening problem with marine refuse. On occasion, vast amounts of garbage suddenly wash up on the beach. The rubbish often bears Simplified Chinese characters, leading citizens to suspect that it originates from Mainland Chinese ships. On 1 August 2017, more than 18 lorry-loads worth of rubbish washed up on the beach in one 24-hour period.

=== Sand loss ===
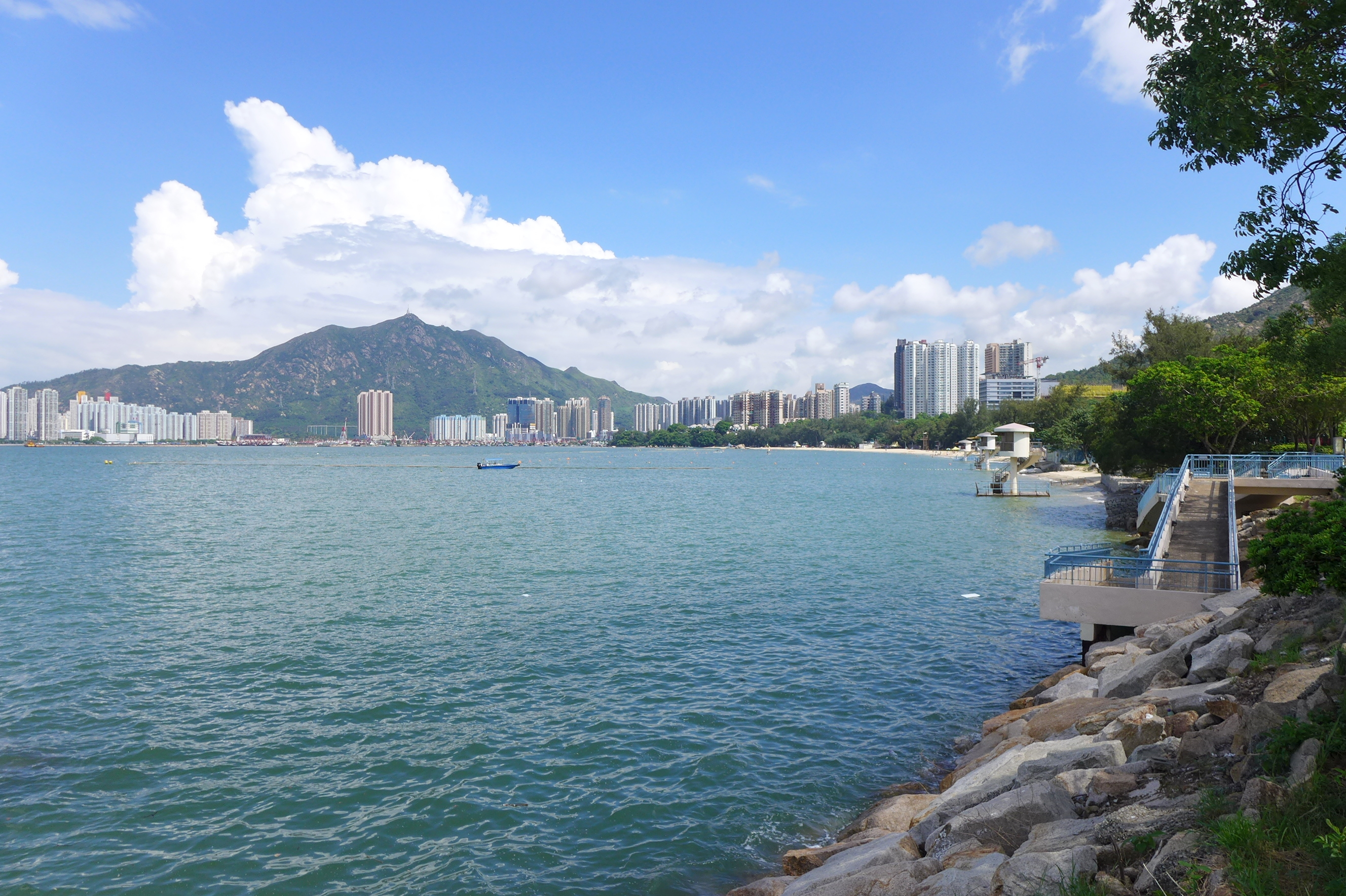
A submerged lifeguard tower is visible at right, illustrating the sand loss problem.

The beach suffers from serious loss of sand, and has shrunk significantly over the past two decades. The bases of several lookout towers, which were once set well back from the water line, are now exposed to the sea. In April 1999, the beach was replenished with about 7,900 cubic metres of sand.

The Civil Engineering and Development Department (CEDD) and Halcrow Group analysed aerial imagery taken from 2001 to 2008 and found that Golden Beach eroded by up to two metres per year, affecting its recreational value. The study found that the high rate of sand loss is driven by the fact that Golden Beach is situated oblique to the prevailing wave direction. This has caused sand to migrate north, in an anti-clockwise direction, such that the southern end of the beach has completely been eroded.

The LCSD had to close part of the beach in 2008 as the problem worsened. After Typhoon Hagupit hit Hong Kong in September 2008, the LCSD hired the CEDD to conduct remedial works at Golden Beach, at a cost of HK$7.2 million. This included replenishment of sand, construction of gabion walls, and construction of groynes. These improvements were made from 2009 to 2011. Still, Golden Beach is smaller than its original size and length.

=== Water quality ===
The Environmental Protection Department conducts water quality testing at Golden Beach at least three times per month, year-round. The department uses a four-point grading system to reflect water quality, where Grade 1 (Good) reflects the best quality. During the 1990s, the water quality at Golden Beach consistently ranked as Grade 3 (Poor). Various sewerage infrastructure improvements have helped boost the quality to an average of Grade 2 (Fair) since the turn of the millennium.

During the 2016 swimming season, the water quality ranked Grade 2 (Fair) for about 85 per cent of tests, and Grade 1 (Good) about 15 per cent of the time.

== See also ==
- Beaches of Hong Kong
- Hong Kong Gold Coast
