= So Kwun Wat =

Area of Hong Kong

Coordinates: 22.375°N 114.001°E

- Traditional Chinese: 掃管笏
- Simplified Chinese: 扫管笏
Transcriptions
Standard Mandarin
- Hanyu Pinyin: Sǎoguǎnhù
Yue: Cantonese
- Jyutping: Sou3 gun2 fat1

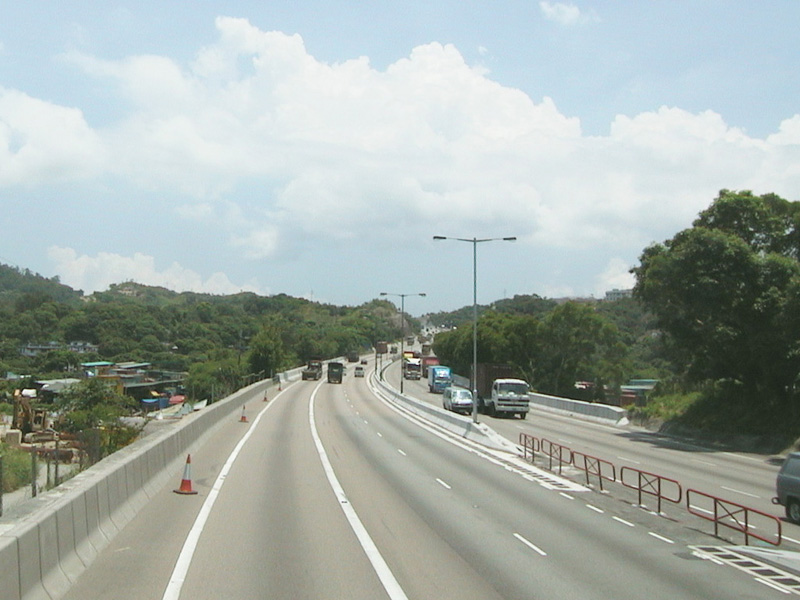
Tuen Mun Road near So Kwun Wat. The carriageway on the left is towards Tsuen Wan and that on the right is towards Tuen Mun.

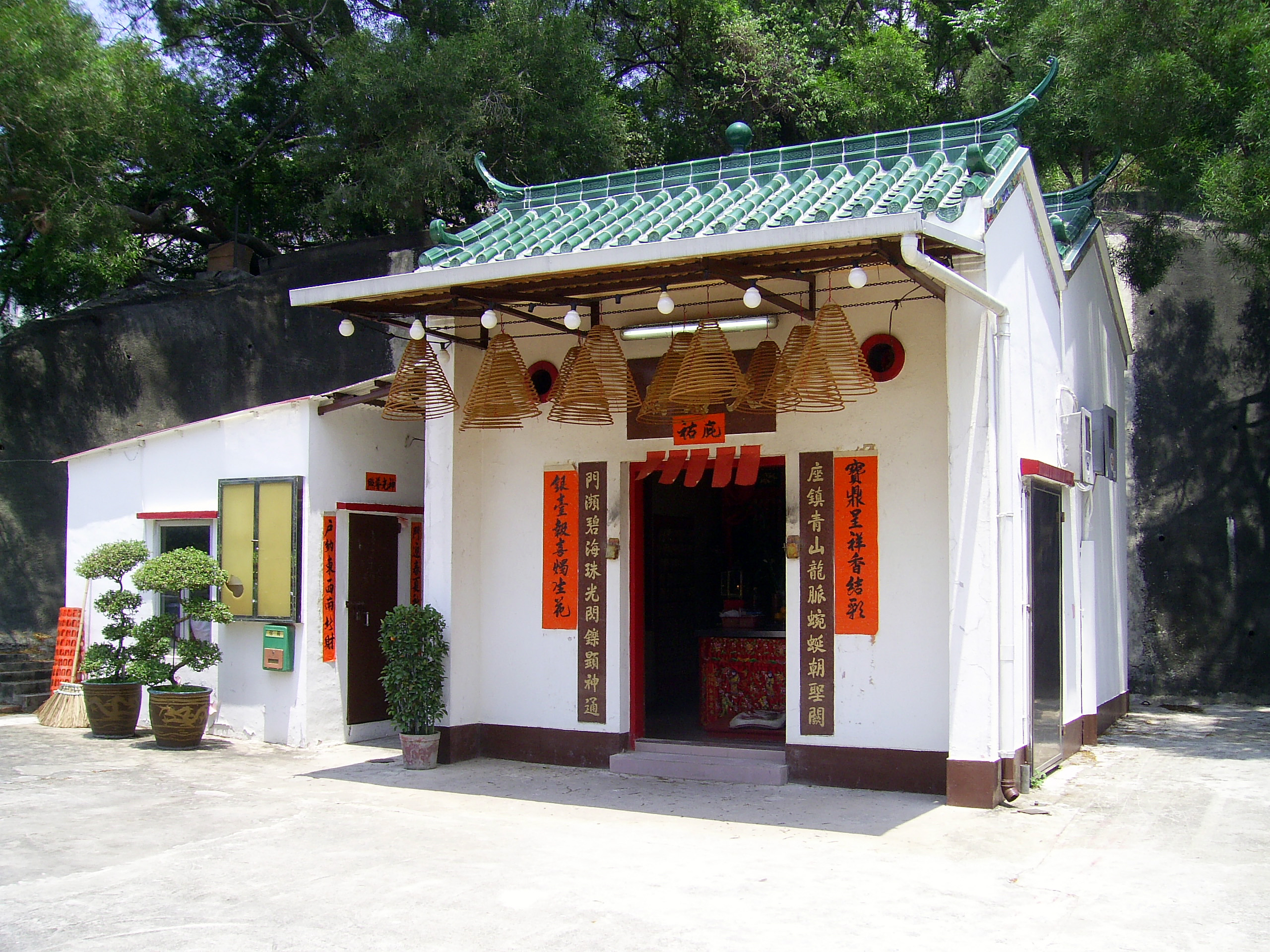
Tin Hau Temple in So Kwun Tan.

So Kwun Wat, commonly pronounced So Kwun Fat, is an area on the south coast of the western mainland New Territories in Hong Kong. The proper So Kwun Wat is a populated area in the valley between Siu Lam and Sam Shing Hui. It includes So Kwun Tan (掃管灘) on the shore, which is a residential area, Hong Kong Gold Coast (香港黃金海岸), with villas on Pearl Island (龍珠島) off the coast.

Administratively, the area belongs to Tuen Mun District. Northwest of So Kwun Tan is the Perowne Camp (寶龍軍營 or 掃管軍營).

== Name ==
The confusion regarding its name originates from a common mistake when a person, with some knowledge of Chinese/Cantonese, tries to guess the pronunciation of the last character in the name, based on the form of its Chinese character. The English transliteration actually came from the correct (but no longer used in everyday life) pronunciation, although it's the common (but technically incorrect) pronunciation that is recognised by the locals. This causes many to wrongly deduce that the transliteration was not properly done. (When in fact it was – much like the case with the name Mong Kok)

== Geography ==
The valley of So Kwun Wat collects water for adjacent ranges and empties into the sea by So Kwun Tan. The area surrounding was reclaimed. A breakwater is constructed from Gold Coast Hotel towards the Pearl Island. While the interior water formed a haven for boats, the exterior become a man-made beach of Golden Beach (黃金泳灘).

== Administration ==
So Kwun Wat is a recognized village under the New Territories Small House Policy.

== Transport ==
The major road access in the area is Castle Peak Road. It is thus also known as 18 miles (milestone) Castle Peak Road (青山公路十八咪). The 43 minibus line also serves here to major centres of Tuen Mun for example VCity and Tuen Mun Town Plaza.

== Education ==
- Harrow International School Hong Kong is located in So Kwun Wat.
- Chu Hai College of Higher Education has been located in So Kwun Wat since August 2016.
- Shun Tak Fraternal Association Lee Kam Primary School (順德聯誼總會李金小學) is located at No. 23 So Kwun Wat Road.

So Kwun Wat is in Primary One Admission (POA) School Net 71. Within the school net are multiple aided schools (operated independently but funded with government money); no government schools are in the school net.

== See also ==
- Tuen Mun Rural Committee
