= Sam Shing (constituency) =

Chinese constituency

- 三聖
- Elected constituency for the Tuen Mun District Council
- Boundary of Sam Shing in Tuen Mun District
- District: Tuen Mun
- Legislative Council constituency: New Territories North West
- Population: 17,237 (2019)
- Electorate: 7,338 (2019)

Current constituency
- Created: 1994
- Number of members: One
- Member: Michael Mo Kwan-tai (Independent)

Sam Shing (Chinese: 三聖) is one of the 31 constituencies in the Tuen Mun District.

Created for the 1994 District Board elections, the constituency returns one district councillor to the Tuen Mun District Council, with an election every four years.

Sam Shing loosely covers areas surrounding Sam Shing Estate and Hong Kong Gold Coast in Tuen Mun with an estimated population of 21,287. It also covers Siu Lam San Tsuen, Tai Lam Chung, Tsz Kan Chau and the Brothers.

== Councillors represented ==
| Election | Member | Party |
|---|---|---|
| 1994 | So Shiu-shing | Independent |
| 2014 | So Shiu-shing | NPP |
| 2019 | Michael Mo Kwan-tai→Vacant | Independent |

== Election results ==
=== 2010s ===
Tuen Mun District Council Election, 2019: Sam Shing
| Party | Candidate | Votes | % | ±% |
|---|---|---|---|---|
| Independent | Michael Mo Kwan-tai | 2,834 | 56.32 | |
| NPP | So Shiu-shing | 2,198 | 43.68 | |
| Majority | | 636 | 12.64 | |
| Turnout | | 3,105 | 74.28 | |
| Independent gain from NPP | | Swing | | |

Tuen Mun District Council Election, 2015: Sam Shing
| Party | Candidate | Votes | % | ±% |
|---|---|---|---|---|
| NPP | So Shiu-shing | 1,837 | 67.31 | +4.68 |
| Independent | Lee Kam-tim | 892 | 32.69 | |
| Majority | | 945 | 4.62 | |
| Turnout | | 2,729 | 35.48 | |
| NPP hold | | Swing | | |

Tuen Mun District Council Election, 2011: Sam Shing
| Party | Candidate | Votes | % | ±% |
|---|---|---|---|---|
| Independent | So Shiu-shing | 1,416 | 62.63 | +1.66 |
| Independent | Yung Sai-ming | 845 | 37.37 | |
| Majority | | 571 | 5.26 | |
| Turnout | | 2,261 | 30.00 | |
| Independent hold | | Swing | | |

=== 2000s ===
Tuen Mun District Council Election, 2007: Sam Shing
| Party | Candidate | Votes | % | ±% |
|---|---|---|---|---|
| Independent | So Shiu-shing | 1,389 | 60.97 | −4.77 |
| Civic | Wendy Wong Hiu-fung | 889 | 39.03 | |
| Majority | | 500 | 11.94 | |
| Independent hold | | Swing | | |

Tuen Mun District Council Election, 2003: Sam Shing
| Party | Candidate | Votes | % | ±% |
|---|---|---|---|---|
| Independent | So Shiu-shing | 1,447 | 65.74 | |
| Independent | Kenny Choi Tin-man | 754 | 34.26 | |
| Majority | | 693 | 11.48 | |
| Independent hold | | Swing | | |

=== 1990s ===
Tuen Mun District Council Election, 1999: Sam Shing
| Party | Candidate | Votes | % | ±% |
|---|---|---|---|---|
| Independent | So Shiu-shing | Uncontested | | |
| Independent hold | | Swing | | |

Tuen Mun District Board Election, 1994: Sam Shing
| Party | Candidate | Votes | % | ±% |
|---|---|---|---|---|
| Independent | So Shiu-shing | 935 | 53.16 | |
| Independent | Choi Wah-tong | 824 | 46.84 | |
| Majority | | 111 | 6.32 | |
| Independent win (new seat) | | | | |
