= Hong Kong Gold Coast =

Housing estate in So Kwun Wat, Hong Kong

Coordinates: 22.37167°N 113.99267°E

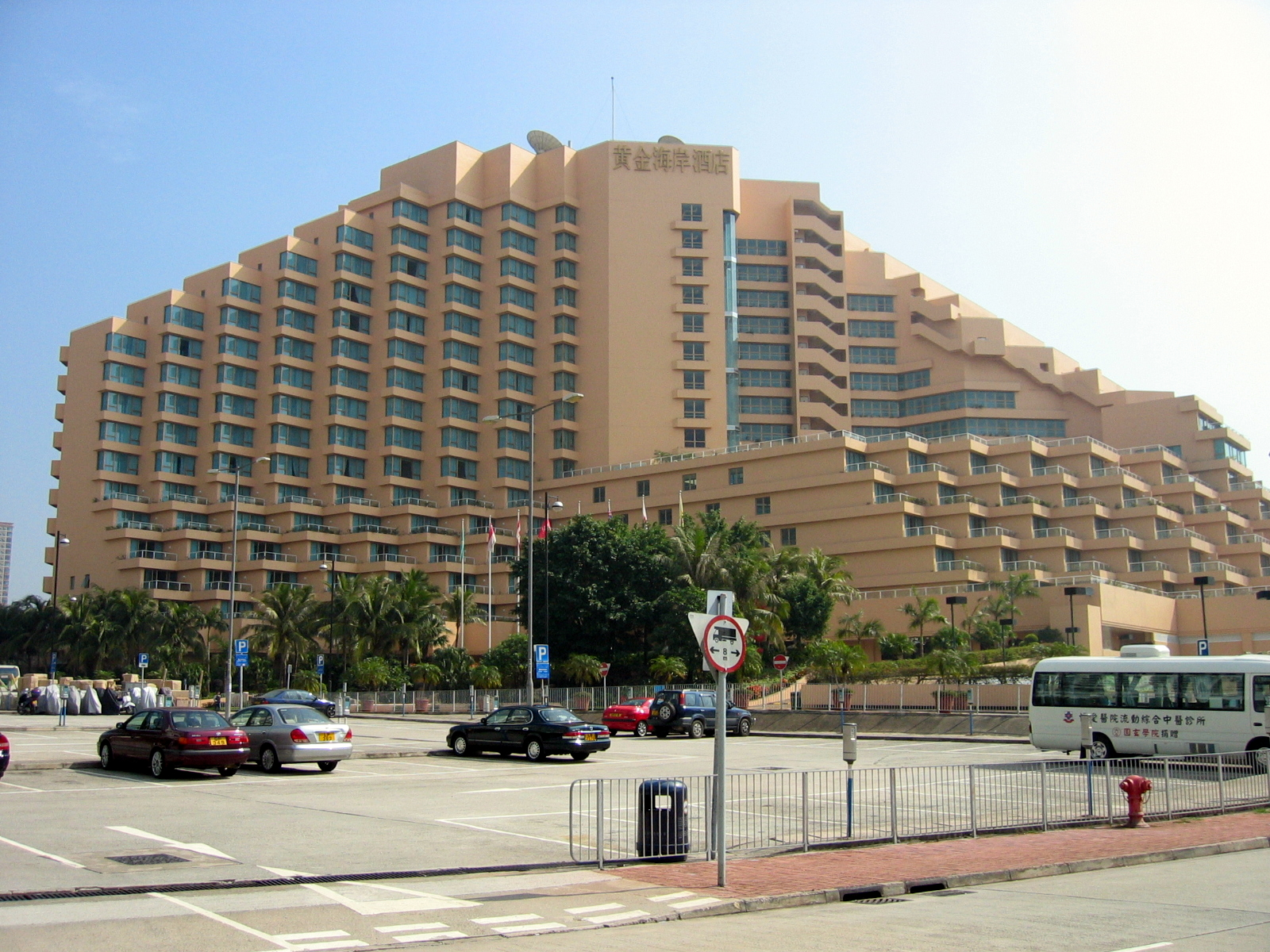
- Hong Kong Gold Coast Hotel
- Traditional Chinese: 香港黃金海岸
- Simplified Chinese: 香港黄金海岸
Transcriptions
Standard Mandarin
- Hanyu Pinyin: Xiānggǎng Huángjīn Hǎi'àn
Yue: Cantonese
- Jyutping: Hoeng1 gong2 wong4 gam1 hoi2 ngon6

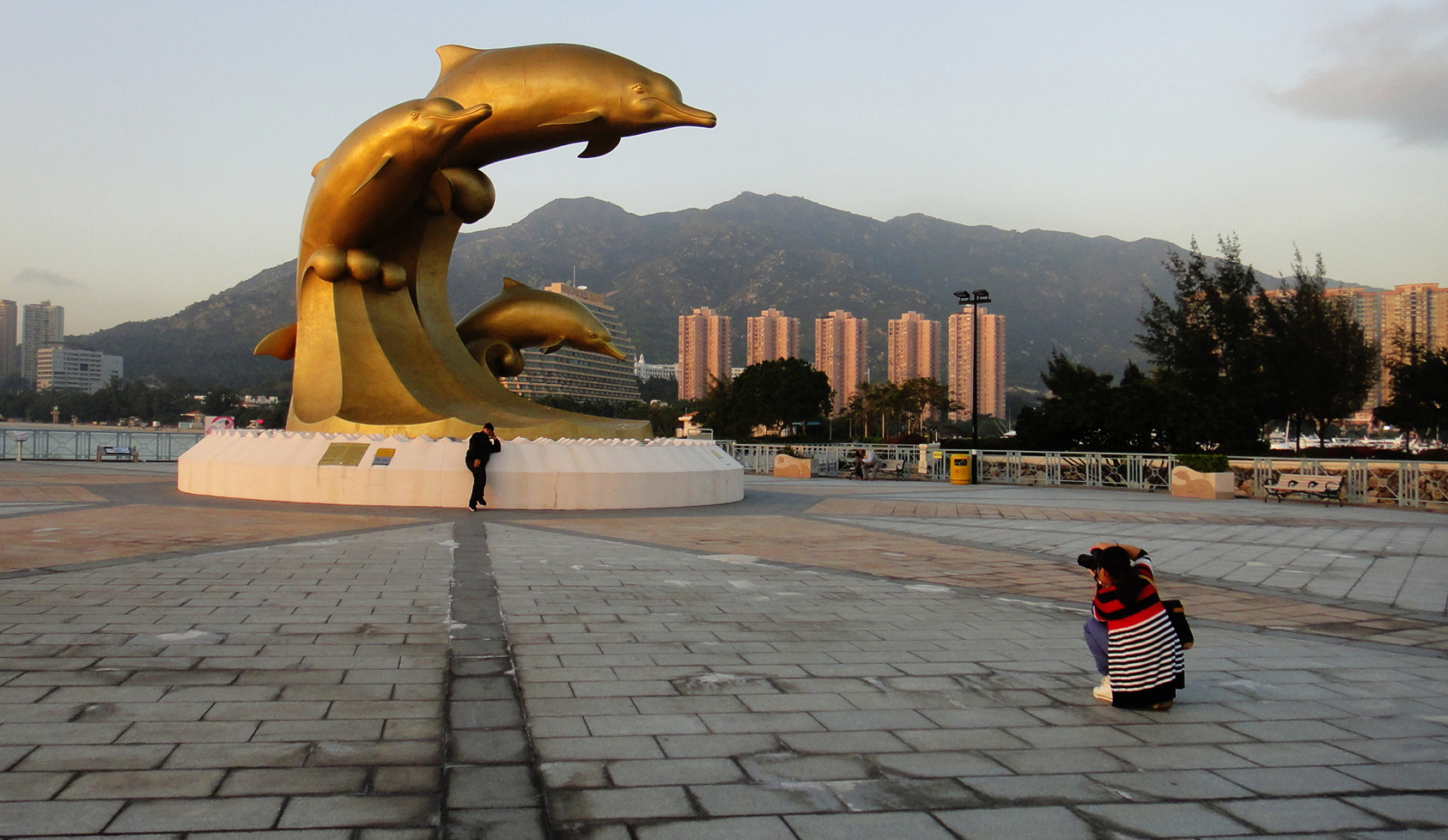
Gold Coast Dolphin Square in Hong Kong

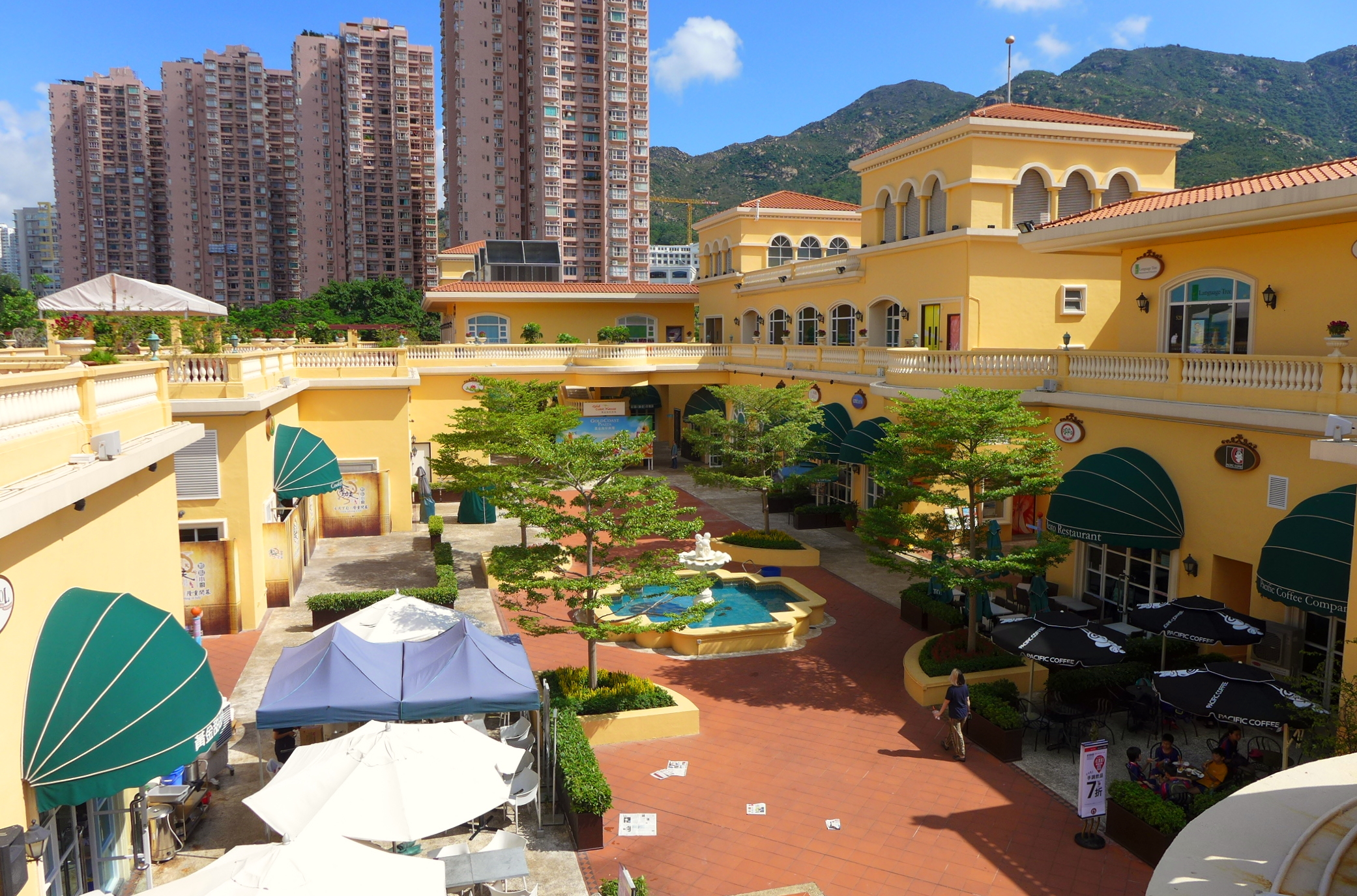
Hong Kong Gold Coast Shopping Mall

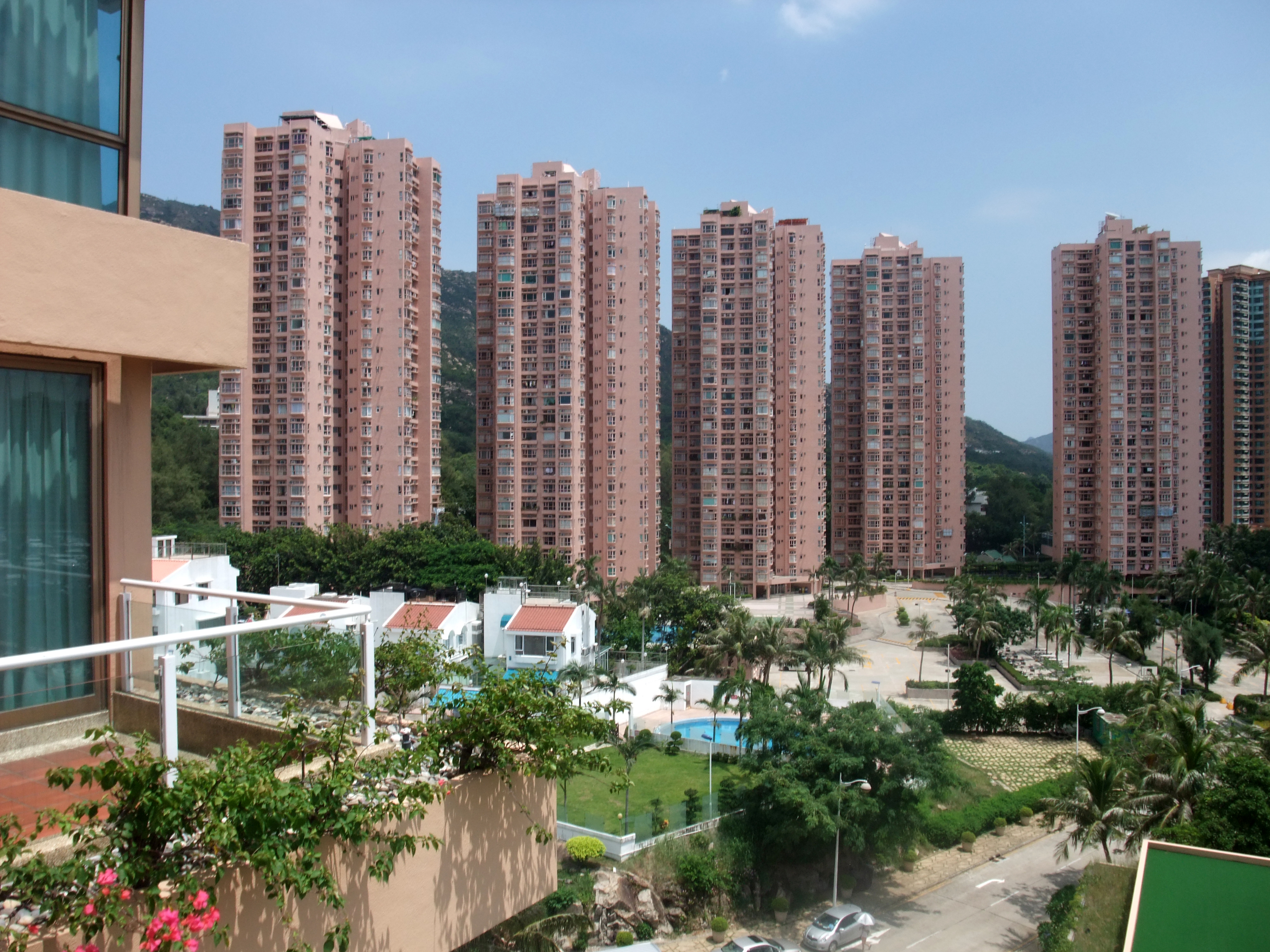
Tower 1 to 5 of Hong Kong Gold Coast

Hong Kong Gold Coast is a private housing estate served by Castle Peak Road, near Castle Peak Bay, in So Kwun Wat, Tuen Mun, New Territories, Hong Kong. Developed by Sino Group, it includes 20 residential buildings completed in two phases (in 1990 and 1993 respectively), a resort hotel, a shopping mall, a yacht and country club, a marina and a beach.

== History ==
The site of approximately 100 acres was purchased by Sino in the early 1980s. The first residential phase, comprising five 28-storey blocks, was completed in 1990. The hotel opened in 1993.

The Environmental Protection Department fined Sino Estate Management several times for causing pollution, as the sewage treatment plant at Gold Coast was too small and could not treat the sewage generated to the required standard. The company received a fine of $15 million in March 1993, $5,000 in early 1994, and two fines of $100,000 in 1995.

== Features ==
Hong Kong Gold Coast is the largest tourist resort in Tuen Mun. Its facilities include the Hong Kong Gold Coast Hotel, a convention centre, a shopping mall, a marina club, the Golden Beach and the newly constructed Hong Kong Gold Coast Dolphin Square.

The Golden Beach is the largest public beach in Tuen Mun and the first artificial beach in Hong Kong. Tropical trees, like coconut, and flowers of various species are planted on both sides of a 480-metre long promenade running parallel to it.

== Education ==
Gold Coast is in Primary One Admission (POA) School Net 71. Within the school net are multiple aided schools (operated independently but funded with government money); no government schools are in the school net.

These schools aren't actually in the Gold Coast itself; rather, they're located in So Kwun Wat.

== Covid Pandemic ==
Tower 9 of Gold Coast Phase II was put under lockdown between the 6th & 7th of February 2021.
