= Sam Shing Hui =

Village in Hong Kong

Coordinates: 22°22′55″N 113°58′38″E

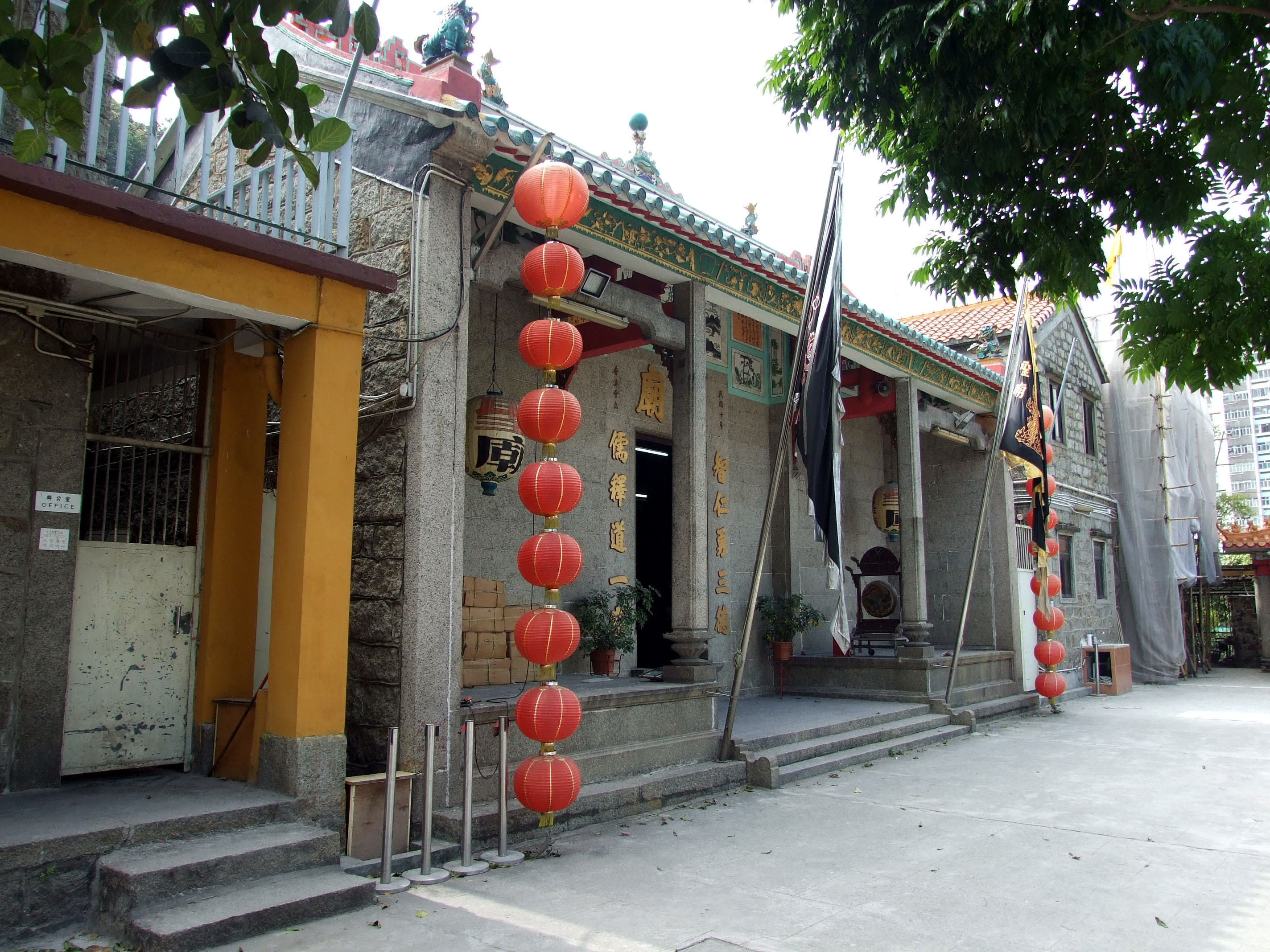
Sam Shing Temple (三聖廟) aka. Shing Miu in Sam Shing Hui.

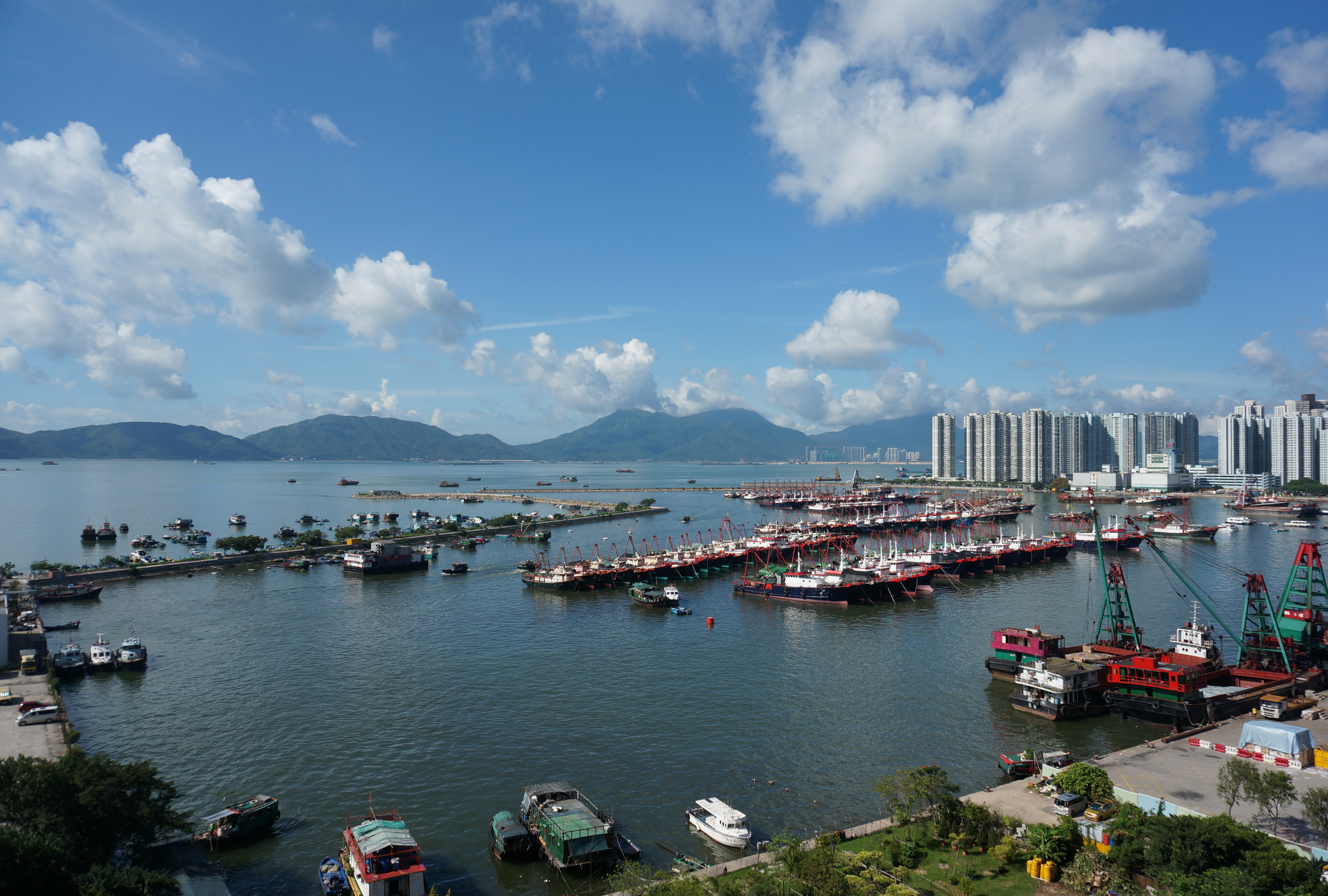
Castle Peak Bay, viewed from Sam Shing Hui

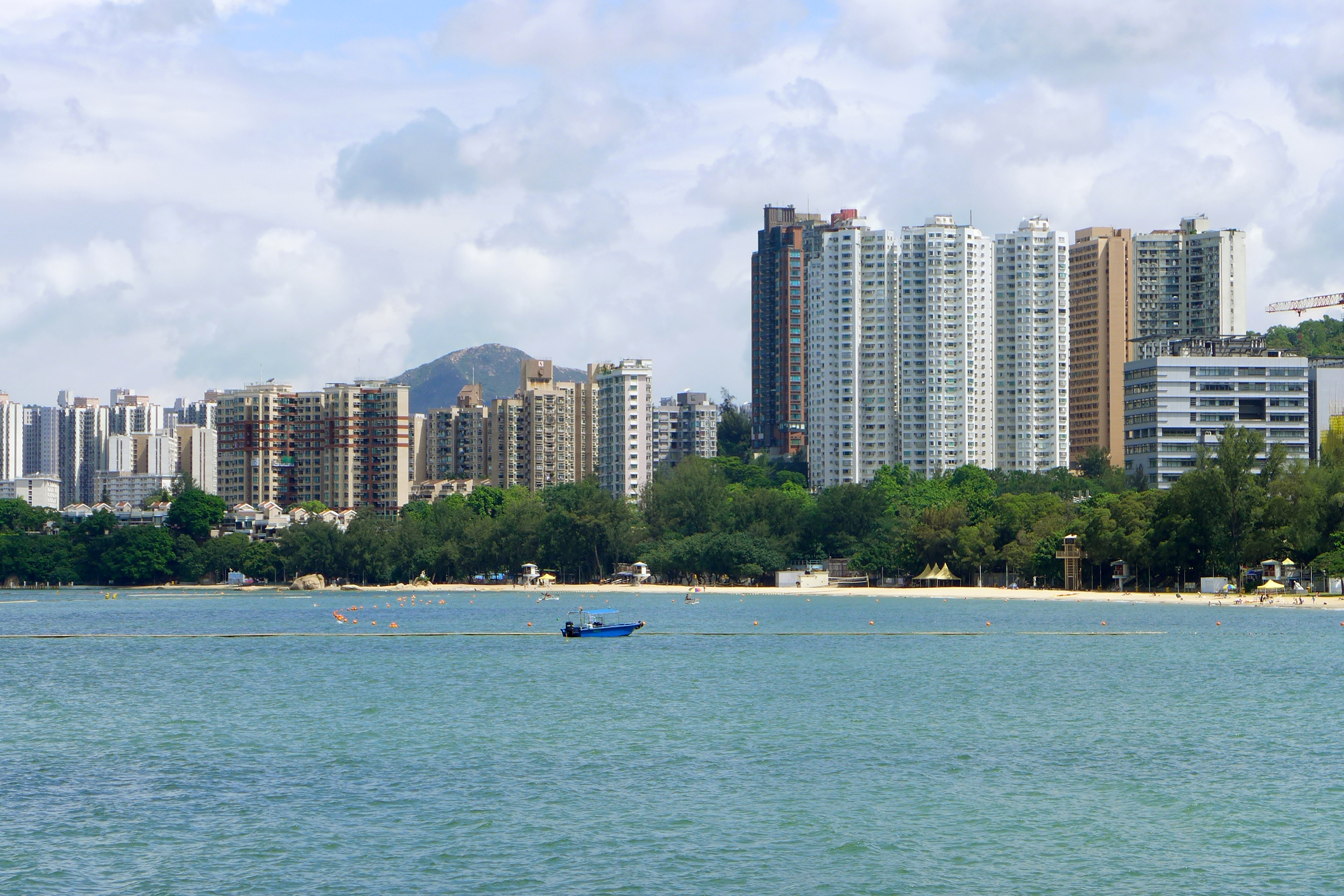
Sam Shing Hui

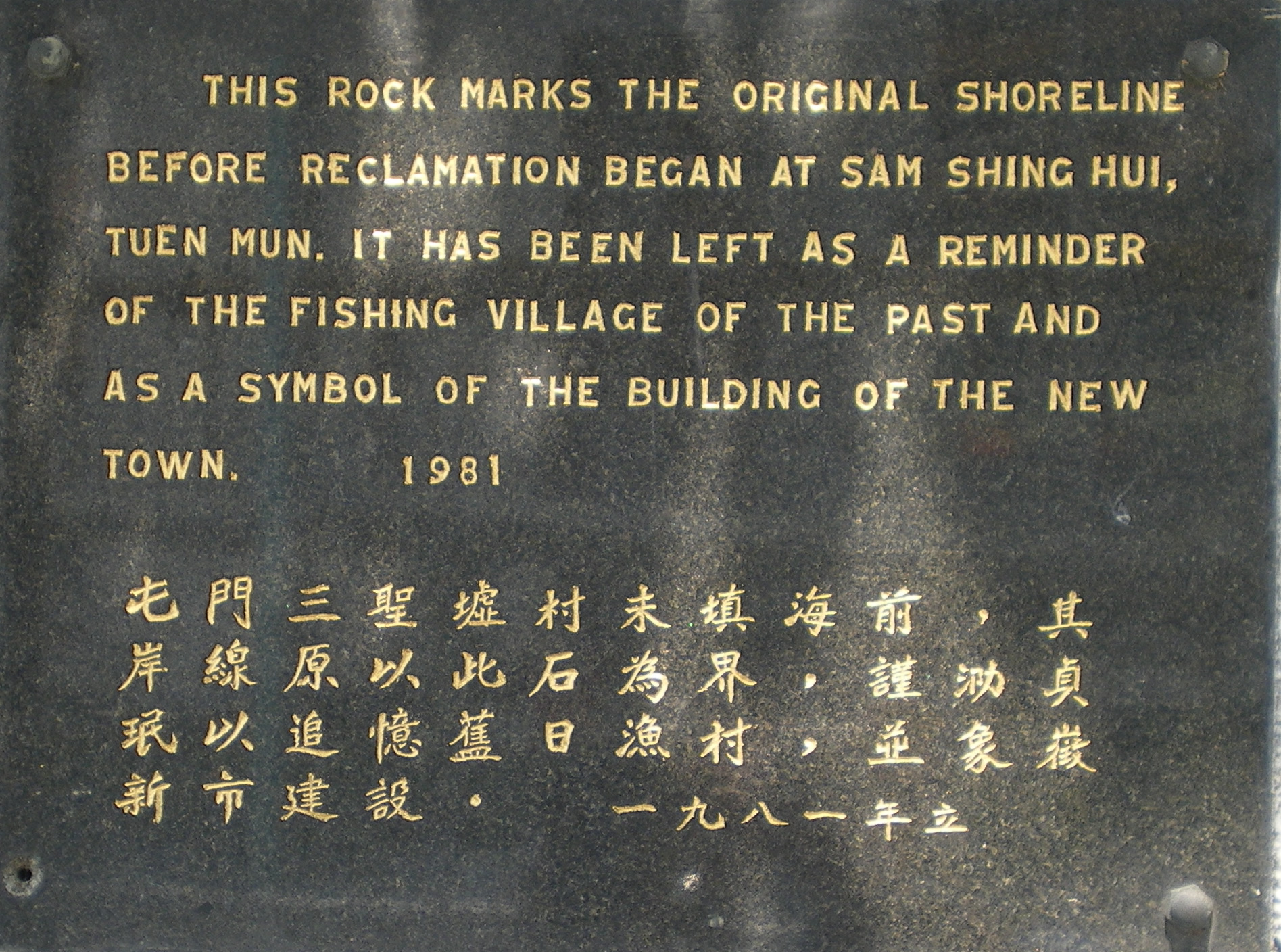
Plaque commemorating the former Sam Shing Hui village.

Sam Shing Hui (Chinese: 三聖墟; lit. Three Saints market) is an area and a former fishing village in Tuen Mun, Tuen Mun District, Hong Kong. It is located on the southeast coast of Castle Peak Bay, between Tseng Tau Village (井頭村) and So Kwun Wat Village (掃管笏村). The Sam Shing Hui Seafood Market (三聖墟海鮮市場) there is one of the famous seafood markets in Hong Kong.

== History ==
The original name of Sam Shing Hui was Castle Peak Bay, and later it was named after the Sam Shing Temple, which was built on the hillside next to the village and dedicated to three local saints. Next to the temple stands a huge stone with an inscription in front of it that reads, "Before reclamation, the coastline was marked by this stone." This is the symbol of Tuen Mun’s coastline in the past. The residents in the village are mainly Tanka (疍家) people and Hakka (客家) people. By the early 1950s, due to the increasing number of immigrants from the China, many huts had been built on the hillside and Sam Shing Village (三聖村) was formed. Residents built shacks on the beach and the coastal areas gradually developed into markets called Sam Shing Hui.

In 1976, the Hong Kong government developed the new town of Tuen Mun. Many shacks in Sam Shing Village were demolished and Sam Shing Estate (三聖邨) was built after land reclamation.。Many private residences were also built nearby from the 1980s to the early 1990s.

== See also ==
- Sam Shing Estate
- Tuen Mun Road
- Tuen Mun San Hui
- So Kwun Wat
