= Hong Kong Gold Coast Hotel =

Building in So Kwun Wat, Hong Kong

Coordinates: 22.37187°N 113.98911°E

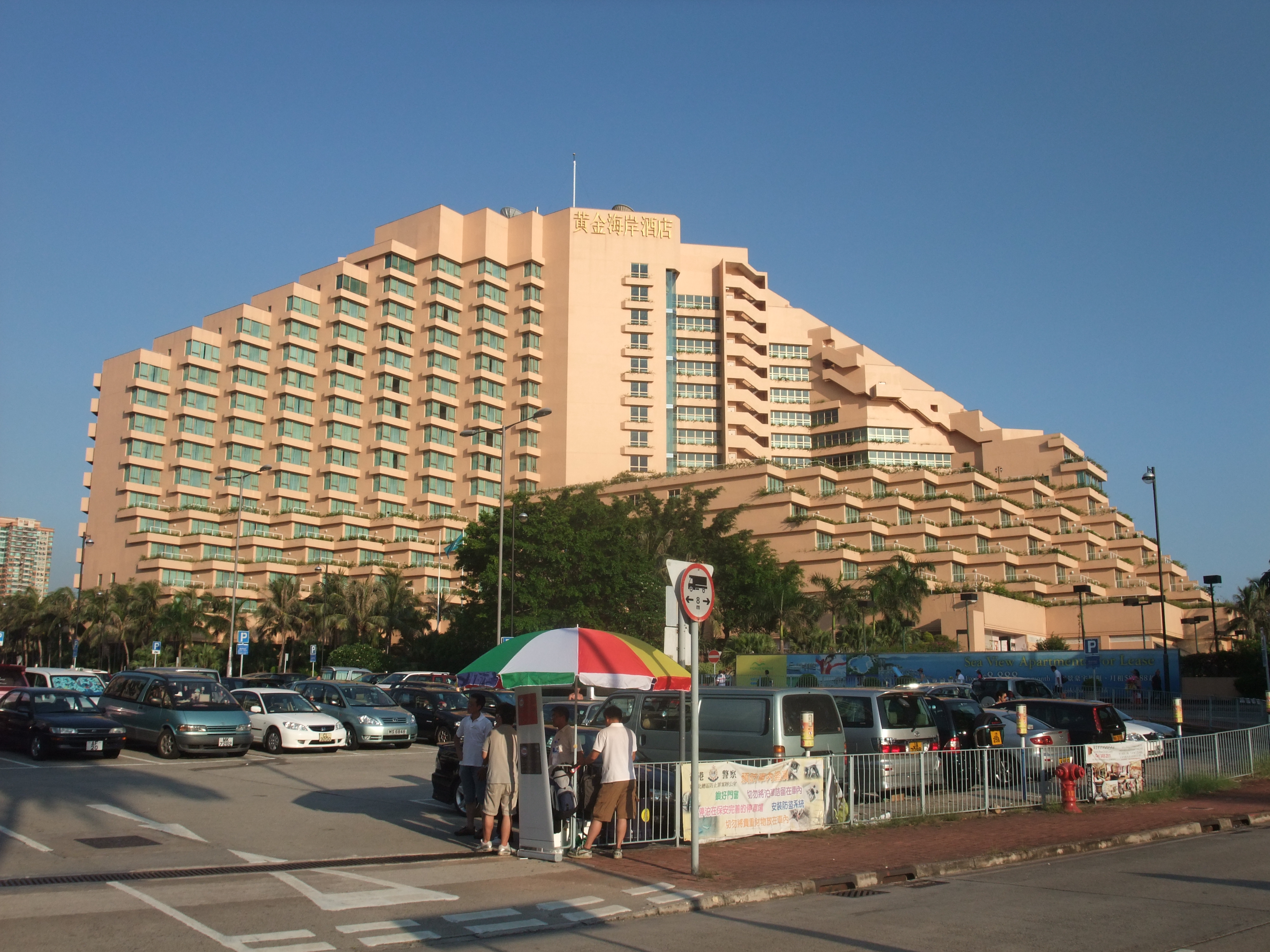
- Interactive map of the Hong Kong Gold Coast Hotel area

General information
- Location: So Kwun Wat, Tuen Mun District, New Territories, Hong Kong
- Opening: 1993

Design and construction
- Developer: Sino Group

Other information
- Number of rooms: 453
- Number of restaurants: 4

Website
- The Official Site of The Hong Kong Gold Coast Hotel

Hong Kong Gold Coast Hotel
- Traditional Chinese: 香港黃金海岸酒店
- Simplified Chinese: 香港黄金海岸酒店
Transcriptions
Standard Mandarin
- Hanyu Pinyin: Xiānggǎng Huángjīn Hǎi'àn Jiǔdiàn
Yue: Cantonese
- Jyutping: Hoeng1 gong2 wong4 gam1 hoi2 ngon6 zau2 dim3

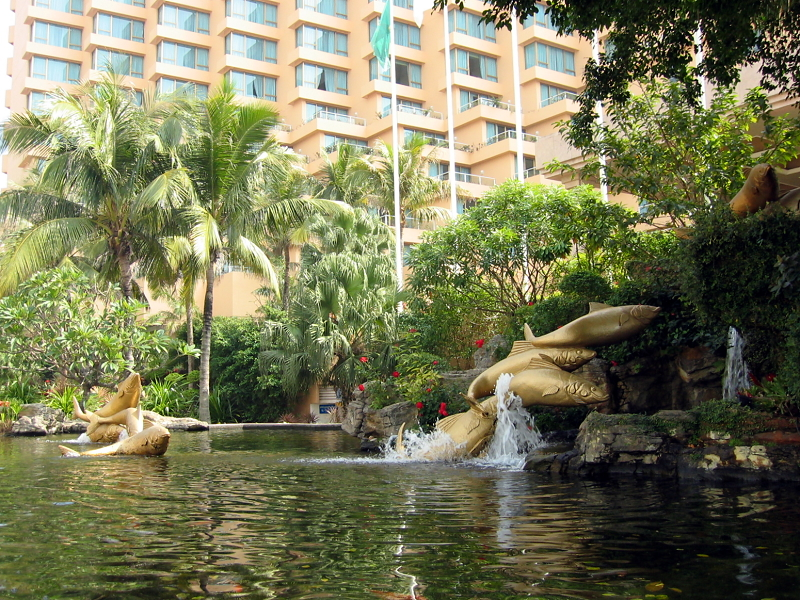
A fountain at the Hong Kong Gold Coast Hotel

Hong Kong Gold Coast Hotel is a five-star hotel and conference centre at 1 Castle Peak Road, So Kwun Wat, Tuen Mun District, New Territories, Hong Kong. The hotel is part of the Hong Kong Gold Coast, which was developed by the Sino Group and completed in 1993, offering a total of 453 guest rooms. Besides the hotel, the area includes a yacht club, country club, marina, shopping mall and residential buildings.
