= Sam Shing Estate =

Public housing estate in Tuen Mun, Hong Kong

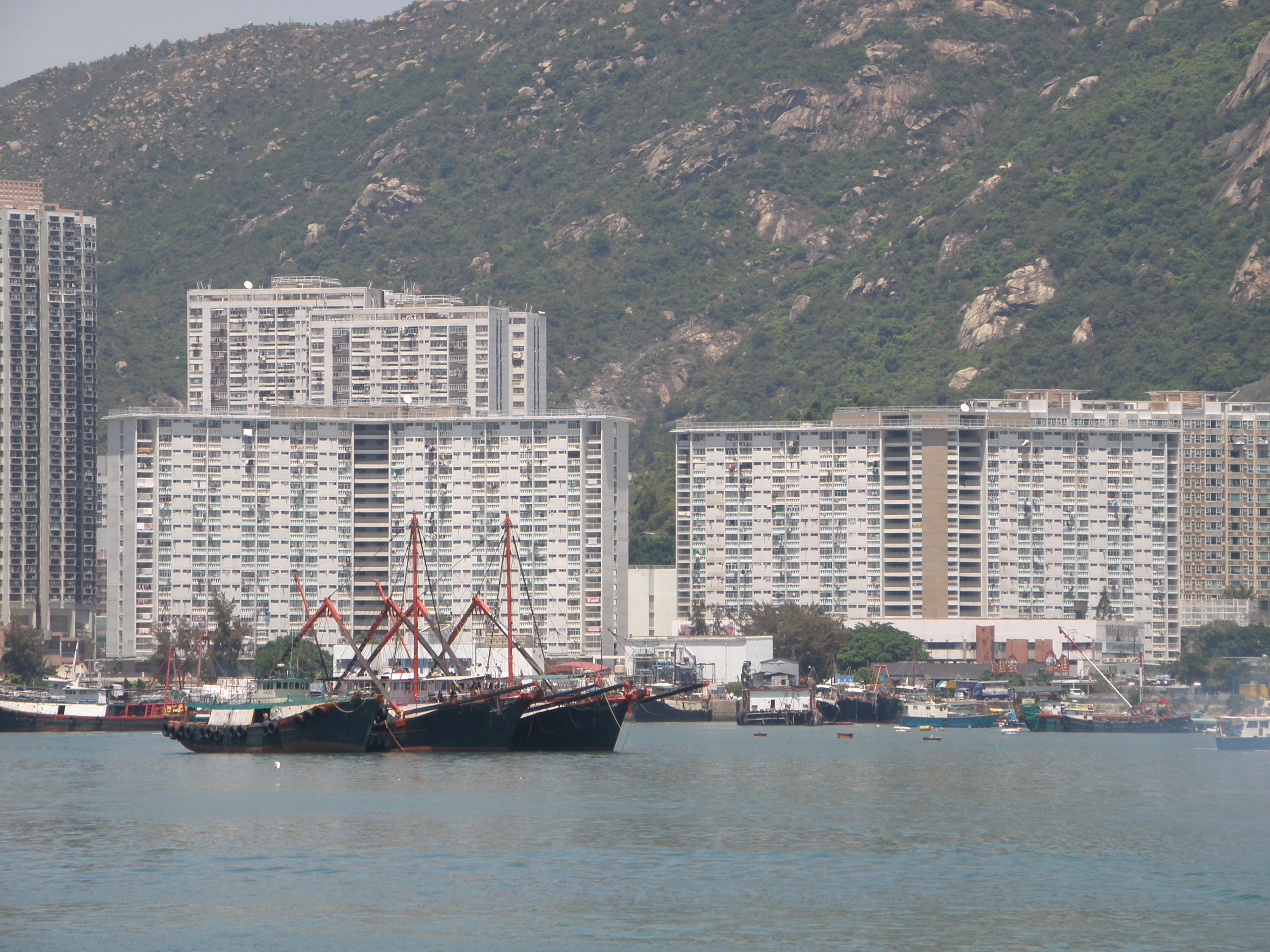
- Sam Shing Estate
- Interactive map of Sam Shing Estate

General information
- Location: 6 Sam Shing Street, Tuen Mun; New Territories, Hong Kong
- Coordinates: 22.381174°N 113.978200°E
- Status: Completed
- Category: Public rental housing
- Population: 5,044 (2016)
- No. of blocks: 3
- No. of units: 1,834

Construction
- Constructed: 1980; 46 years ago
- Authority: Hong Kong Housing Authority

Sam Shing Estate (Chinese: 三聖邨) is a public housing estate in Tuen Mun, New Territories, Hong Kong, near Light Rail Sam Shing stop and Castle Peak Beach. Built on the reclaimed land of Castle Peak Bay, it is the third public housing estate in Tuen Mun and the estate consists of 3 residential blocks completed in 1980. It was named for nearby Sam Shing Hui, a fishing village in the district, and most of the residents in the estate were fishermen.

== Houses ==
| Name | Chinese name | Building type | Completed |
|---|---|---|---|
| Chun Yu House | 進漁樓 | Double H | 1980 |
| Fung Yu House | 豐漁樓 | Old Slab | 1980 |
| Moon Yu House | 滿漁樓 | Old Slab | 1980 |

== Demographics ==
According to the 2016 by-census, Sam Shing Estate had a population of 5,044. The median age was 43.4 and the majority of residents (96.3 per cent) were of Chinese ethnicity. The average household size was 2.8 people. The median monthly household income of all households (i.e. including both economically active and inactive households) was HK$20,500.

== Politics ==
Sam Shing Estate is located in Sam Shing constituency of the Tuen Mun District Council. It was formerly represented by Michael Mo Kwan-tai, who was elected in the 2019 elections until July 2021.

== Education ==
Sam Shing Estate is in Primary One Admission (POA) School Net 71. Within the school net are multiple aided schools (operated independently but funded with government money); no government schools are in the school net.

== See also ==
- Public housing estates in Tuen Mun
