= Siu Lam =

Coordinates: 22.368709°N 114.011633°E

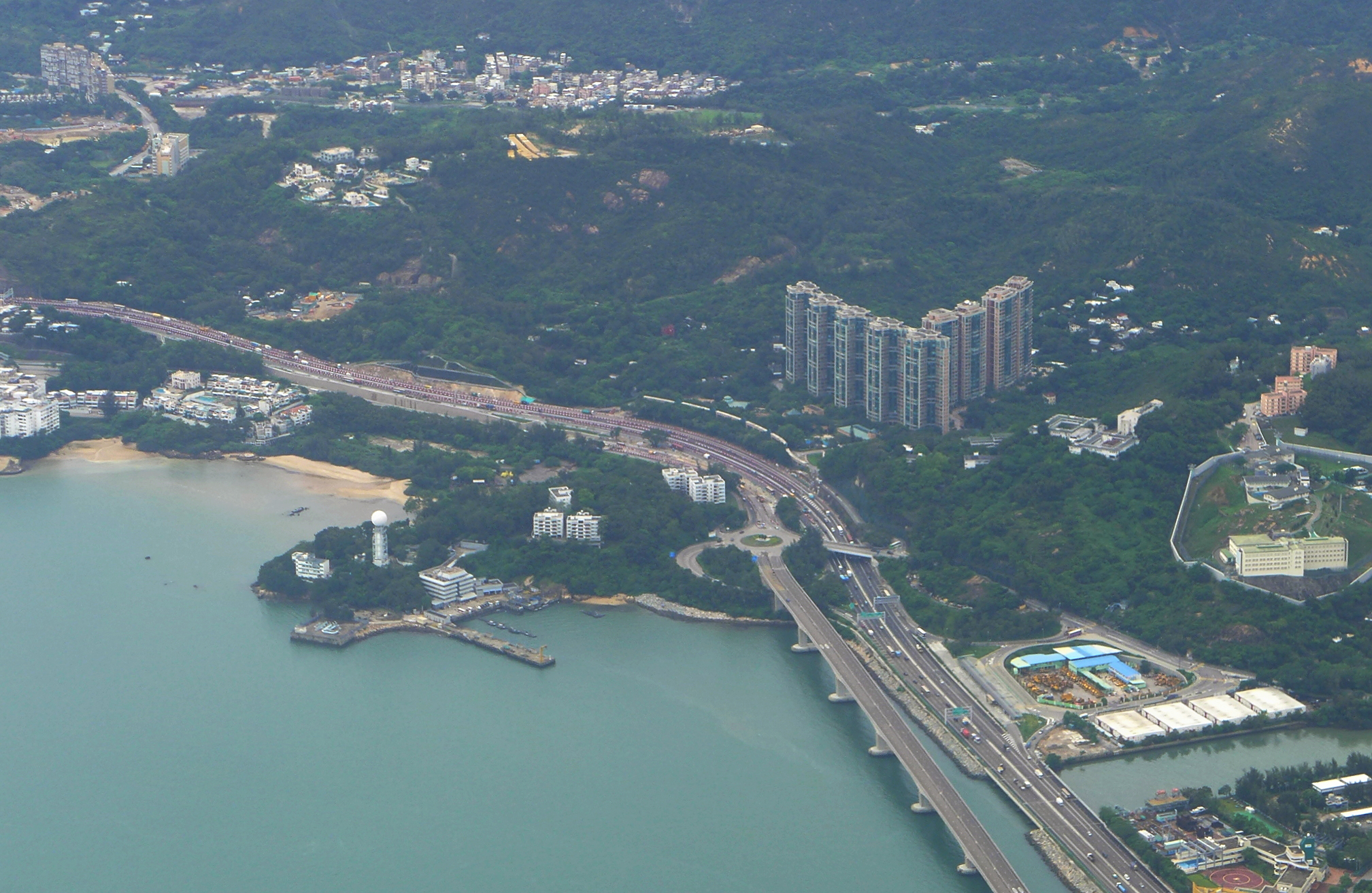
Siu Lam in June 2014.

Siu Lam (Chinese: 小欖) is an area and a village in Tuen Mun District, Hong Kong.

== Administration ==
Siu Lam is one of the 36 villages represented within the Tuen Mun Rural Committee. For electoral purposes, Siu Lam is part of the So Kwun Wat constituency.
