= Siu Hong station =

MTR station in the New Territories, Hong Kong

Siu Hong 兆康
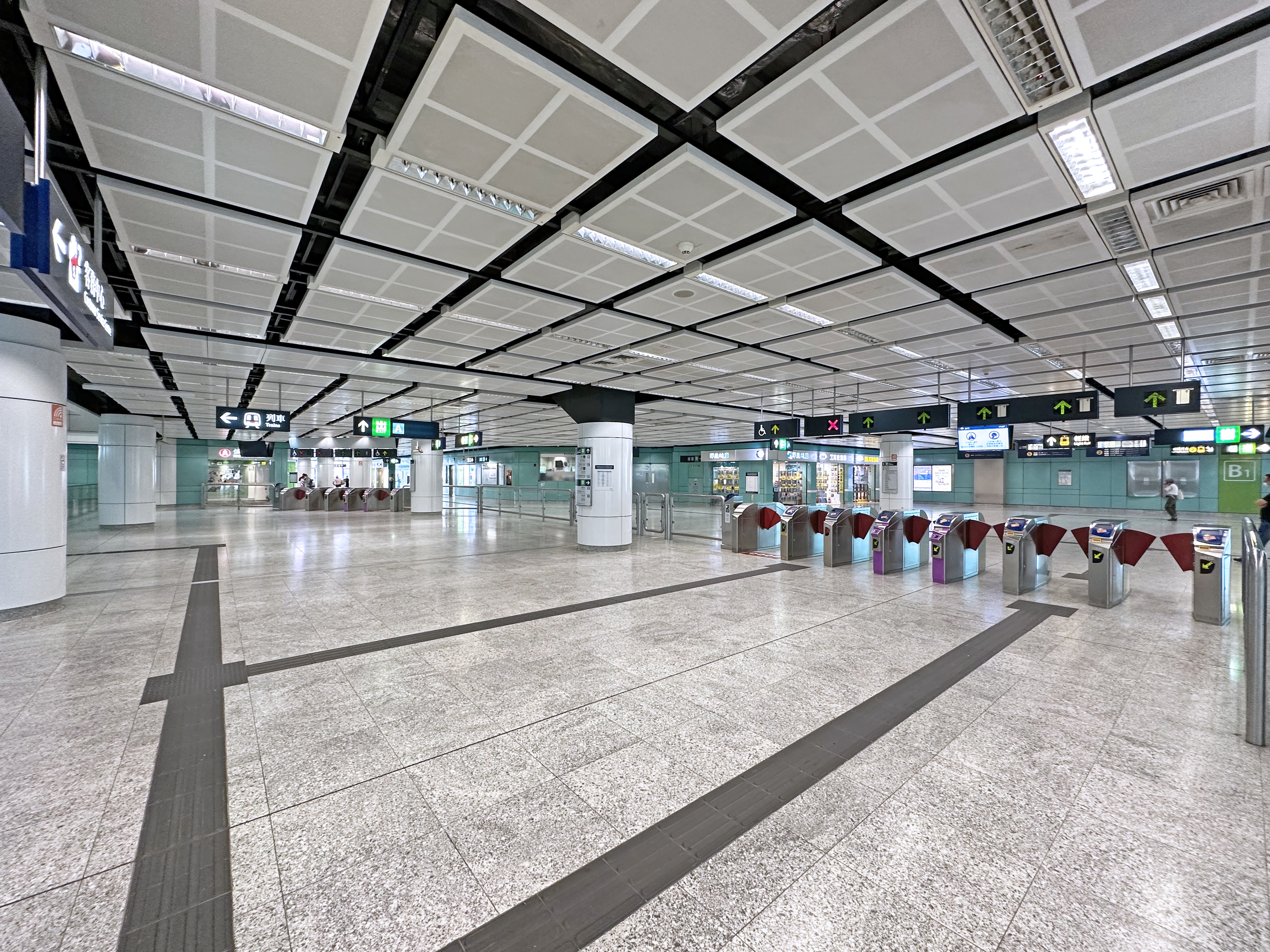
- Station concourse

Chinese name
- Chinese: 兆康
- Cantonese Yale: Siuhhōng
- Literal meaning: Sign or trillion — 兆; Peaceful and happy － 康
Transcriptions
Standard Mandarin
- Hanyu Pinyin: Zhàokāng
Yue: Cantonese
- Yale Romanization: Siuhhōng
- Jyutping: Siu6hong1

General information
- Location: Tuen Mun, New Territories; Hong Kong
- Coordinates: 22°24′43″N 113°58′43″E
- System: MTR rapid transit station
- Owner: KCR Corporation
- Operator: MTR Corporation
- Line: Tuen Ma line
- Platforms: 2 (1 island platform)
- Tracks: 2
- Connections: Siu Hong stop routes: 505, 610, 614, 614P, 615, 615P, 751; Bus, minibus

Construction
- Structure type: Elevated
- Platform levels: 1
- Accessible: Yes
- Architect: RMJM

Other information
- Station code: SIH

History
- Opened: 20 December 2003; 22 years ago
- Electrified: 25 kV 50 Hz AC

Services
Preceding station	MTR	Following station
Tuen Mun Terminus	Tuen Ma line	Tin Shui Wai towards Wu Kai Sha
Under Construction
Tuen Mun towards Tuen Mun South	Tuen Ma line	Hung Shui Kiu towards Wu Kai Sha
Preceding stop	MTR Light Rail	Following stop
Ching Chung towards Sam Shing	505 transfer at Siu Hong	Terminus
Tuen Mun Hospital towards Tuen Mun Ferry Pier	610 transfer at Siu Hong	Lam Tei towards Yuen Long
Fung Tei towards Tuen Mun Ferry Pier	614 transfer at Siu Hong	Lam Tei towards Yuen Long
Fung Tei towards Tuen Mun Ferry Pier	614P transfer at Siu Hong	Terminus
Ching Chung towards Tuen Mun Ferry Pier	615 transfer at Siu Hong	Lam Tei towards Yuen Long
Kei Lun towards Tuen Mun Ferry Pier	615P transfer at Siu Hong	Terminus
Tuen Mun Hospital towards Yau Oi	751 transfer at Siu Hong	Lam Tei towards Tin Yat
Track layout
Location
- Location within MTR

Siu Hong (Chinese: 兆康) is an MTR station located beside Siu Hong Court, Tuen Mun, New Territories, Hong Kong. It is built on the Tuen Mun Nullah immediately east of Siu Hong Court. The station is on the Tuen Ma line between Tin Shui Wai and Tuen Mun stations.

Elevated public transport interchanges are provided at both the south and north ends of the station. Two access ramps link the public transport interchanges to Castle Peak Road and Tsing Lun Road for access to feeder services such as buses, minibuses, and taxis.

== History ==
Construction started in July 1999 with the award of civil contract CC-212 for the West Rail line station to HK ACE JV at a contract sum of HK$1,386 million. The topping-out was marked on 26 February 2002 by KCR chairman Michael Tien and transport legislator Miriam Lau. It was opened to the public on 20 December 2003 with the commencement of West Rail service.

The elevated station is located above the Tuen Mun Nullah. To support the station, 352 columns were built in the river bed, impacting the water flow. As a result, the river was widened by about 17 metres along the length of the station to maintain its drainage capacity.

On 27 June 2021, the West Rail line officially merged with the Ma On Shan line (which was already extended into the Tuen Ma line Phase 1 at the time) in East Kowloon to form the new Tuen Ma line, as part of the Sha Tin to Central Link project. Hence, Siu Hong was included in the project and is now an intermediate station on the Tuen Ma line.

== Station layout ==
C / U1	Concourse	Exits, customer services, toilets, vending machines, ATMs, public transport interchanges
P Platforms	Platform 2	Tuen Ma line towards Wu Kai Sha (Tin Shui Wai) →
P Platforms	Island platform, doors will open on the right
P Platforms	Platform 1	← Tuen Ma line towards Tuen Mun (Terminus)
G / L	Light Rail stop	Exits, Light Rail Siu Hong stop

Platforms 1 and 2 share the same island platform.

The first train to Tuen Mun departs at 6:26 a.m., while the last train departs at 12:40 a.m. the day after. The first train to Wu Kai Sha at 5:47 a.m., while the last train departs at 12:17 a.m. the day after.

== Entrances/exits ==
- A: Brilliant Garden
- B1: Light Rail Platform 2
- B2: Light Rail Platform 2
- C1: Light Rail Platforms 1 and 5
- C2: Light Rail Platform 6
- C3: Light Rail Platforms 1 and 5
- D: Lost Property & Travel Scheme Office
- E: San Hing Tsuen
- F: Lingnan University
