= Town Centre stop =

Coordinates: 22°23′28″N 113°58′30″E

Town Centre 市中心
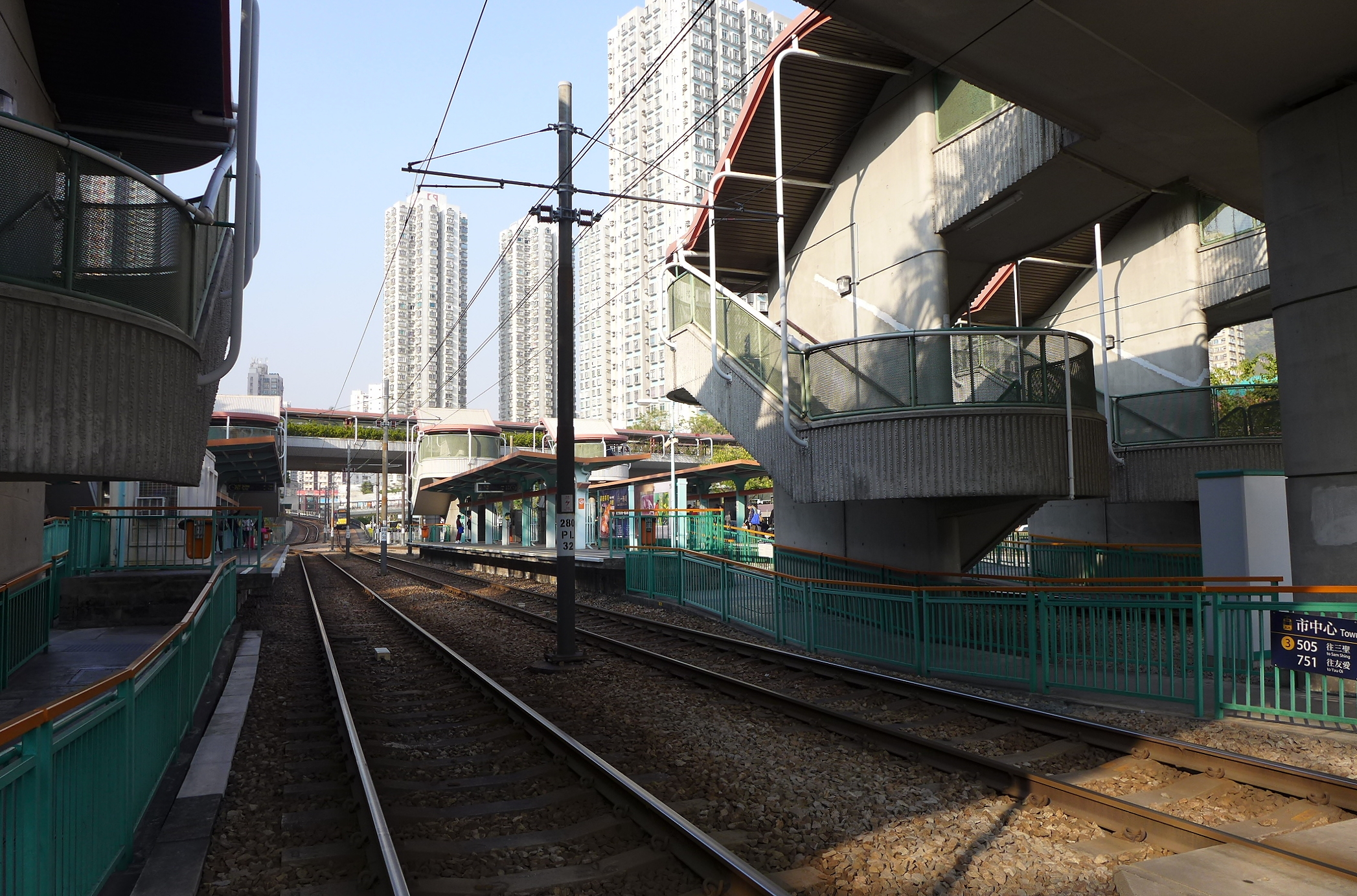
- Town Centre stop platform

General information
- Location: Tuen Mun Town Centre; Tuen Mun District; Hong Kong
- System: MTR Light Rail stop
- Owner: KCR Corporation
- Operator: MTR Corporation
- Line: 505 507 614 614P 751
- Platforms: 4 side platforms
- Tracks: 4
- Connections: Bus, minibus

Construction
- Structure type: At-grade
- Accessible: yes

Other information
- Station code: TOC (English code); 280 (Digital code)
- Fare zone: 2

History
- Opened: 18 September 1988; 37 years ago

Services
Preceding stop	MTR Light Rail	Following stop
On Ting towards Sam Shing	505	Tuen Mun towards Siu Hong
On Ting towards Tuen Mun Ferry Pier	507	Tuen Mun towards Tin King
On Ting towards Tuen Mun Ferry Pier	614	Pui To towards Yuen Long
On Ting towards Tuen Mun Ferry Pier	614P	Pui To towards Siu Hong
Yau Oi Terminus	751	Tuen Mun towards Tin Yat
On Ting One-way operation	751	Tuen Mun towards Tin Yat
Location
- Location within MTR

Town Centre (Chinese: 市中心) is a major MTR Light Rail stop. It is located at ground level at Tuen Mun Heung Sze Wui Road in Tuen Mun Town Centre, Tuen Mun District, Hong Kong. It began service on 18 September 1988 and belongs to Zone 2.

Unlike other intermediate stops in the Light Rail system, a total of four platforms were constructed at Town Centre stop, due to the high level of passenger demand associated with its location within the Tuen Mun town centre proper. It has footbridges linking Tuen Mun Park, Trend Plaza, Tuen Mun Town Plaza and a bus terminus.
