= Tuen Mun Ferry Pier =

Pier in Hong Kong

Coordinates: 22°22′20″N 113°57′58″E

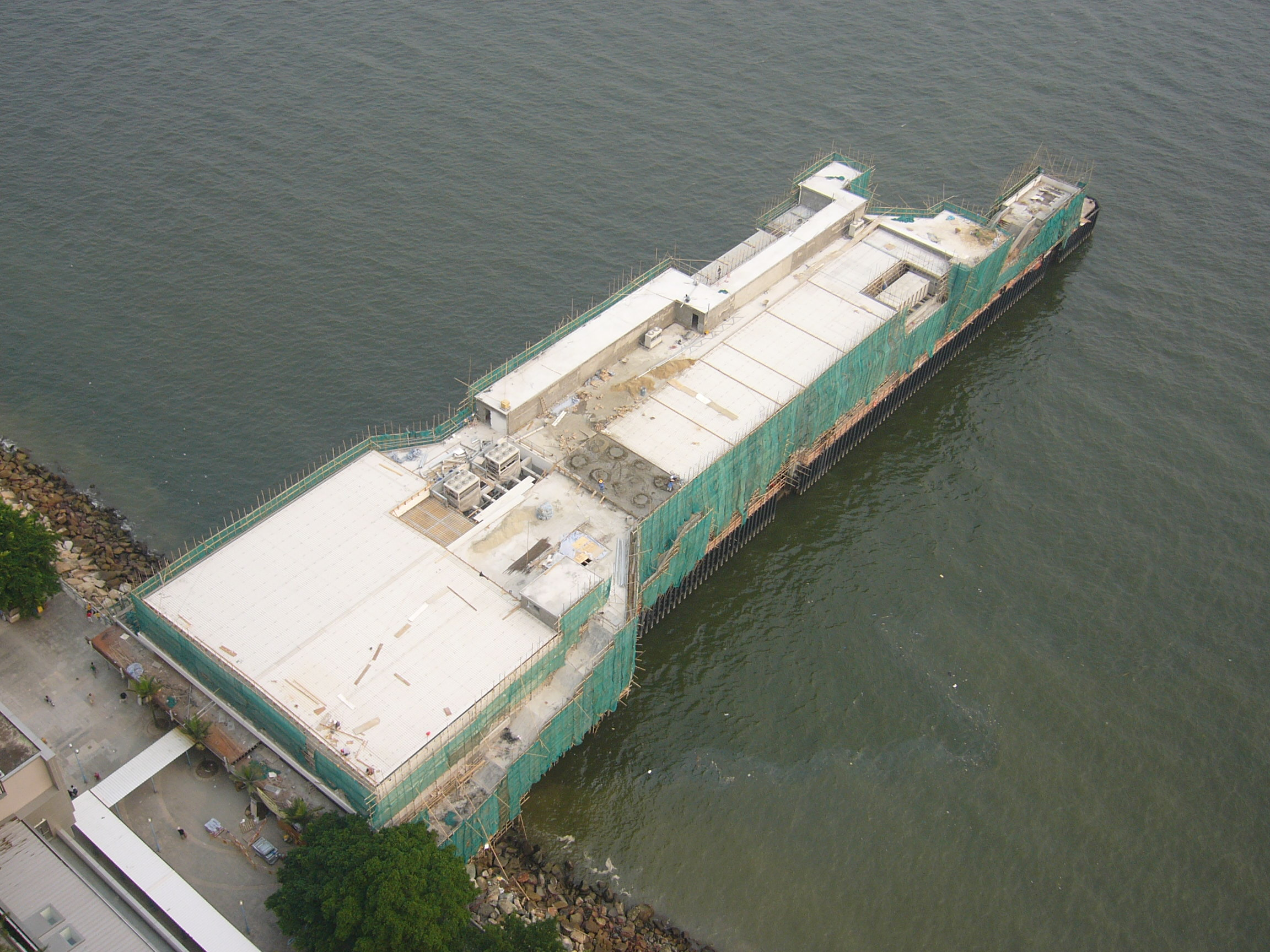
- The Tuen Mun Ferry Pier during its expansion
- Type: Passenger Boarding Pier
- Carries: Public Passenger Ferries
- Spans: A small part of Castle Peak Bay
- Location: Tuen Mun
- Official name: Tuen Mun Ferry Pier

Tuen Mun Ferry Pier
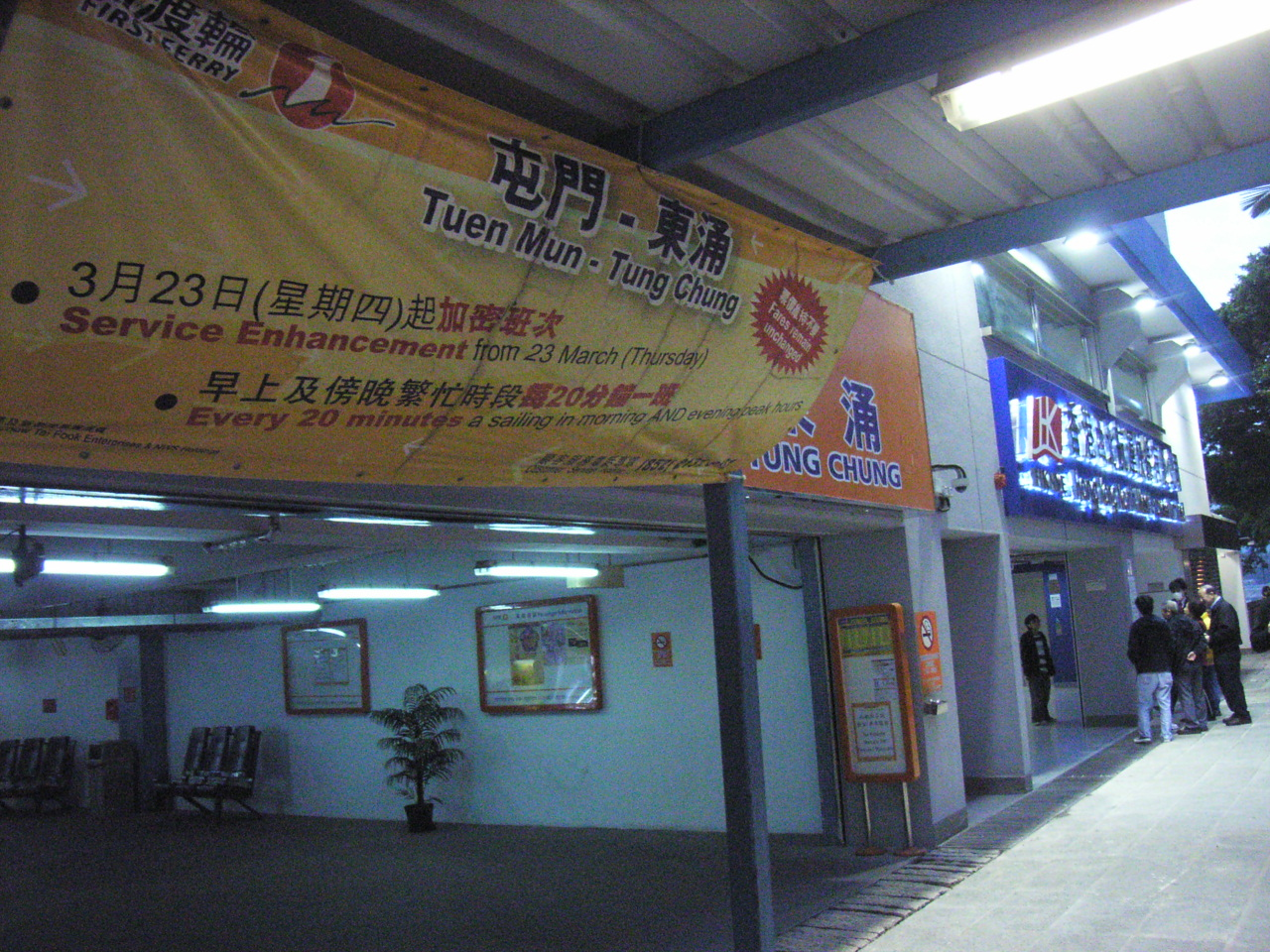
- Tuen Mun Ferry Pier in Jan 2007.
- Traditional Chinese: 屯門碼頭
- Simplified Chinese: 屯门码头
Transcriptions
Standard Mandarin
- Hanyu Pinyin: Tún Mén Mǎtóu
Yue: Cantonese
- Jyutping: tyun4 mun4 maa5 tau4

Tuen Mun Ferry Pier (屯門碼頭), or Tuen Mun Ferry Terminal, is a public pier located in the southern area of Tuen Mun, Hong Kong.

Tuen Mun Ferry Pier, Tuen Mun Pier Head, and Tuen Mun Ferry Pier stop (MTR Light Rail) refer to the street-level transportation hub that is adjacent to the pier and consists of a light rail terminus and a bus terminus. The Ocean Walk shopping centre, above the transportation hub, is managed by MTR Corporation. Pierhead Garden is the private housing estate above the shopping centre and transportation hub.

Before the extensive improvement of the road network during the late 1990s and 2000s, the traffic congestion on the overloaded Tuen Mun Road was unbearable so expansion on this road was needed. During this period, ferry service at this pier was used as an alternative for traffic to and from Central on Hong Kong Island.

== Ferry transport ==
=== Service to Lantau Island ===
Ferry service to Lantau Island (Tung Chung New Development Ferry Pier, Tai O, Sha Lo Wan) is provided by Fortune Ferry with seven daily services to Tung Chung (four to Tai O and Sha Lo Wan on Mondays to Saturdays, five on Sundays or public holidays).

=== Service to Macau and pier expansion ===
The route connecting Macau's Outer Harbour Ferry Terminal and Tuen Mun Ferry Pier operated by Hong Kong North West Express Ltd. was launched on 15 April 2011. Four connections are scheduled daily and each ferry can accommodate up to 278 passengers. The Maritime Administration of Macau has granted a 10-year ferry operation licence to North West Express.

In December 2003, plans for ferry service from Tuen Mun Ferry Pier to Macau began to surface. However, in order for this service to begin, expansion of the pier was required which involved converting it from one storey to two storeys, and repainting.

The application of ferry services between Macau and Tuen Mun was rejected by authorities in Macau in September 2006, citing technical and safety concerns. But on 13 January 2011, Hong Kong North West Express Ltd. has been formally issued the licenses to operate regular passenger ferries between Macau’s Outer Harbour Ferry Terminal and the pier of Tuen Mun, yet, the Port Authority of Macau stressed in the press statement that the company must first pass a series of reviews and tests according to international standards before the new route can become operational.

TurboJet started operating 4 sailings to and from Tuen Mun Pier to Macau on 28 January 2016.

On January 28, 2020, in view of the spread of the COVID-19 pandemic, the government announced that several cross-border ports, including Tuen Mun Ferry Pier, will suspend their cross-boundary services from midnight on the 30th of the same month. However, as on June 1, 2021, the government stated that TurboJET had formally proposed to the government to terminate the relevant lease agreement and returned the Tuen Mun Ferry Terminal to the government on June 8 of the same year, meaning that Tuen Mun to Macau cross-border passenger ferry service will therefore officially end.

=== Service to mainland China ===
==== Zhuhai ====
The ferry service, operated by Hong Kong North West Express Limited (HKNWEL), to Jiuzhou Port of Zhuhai in mainland China commenced on 3 November 2006 with 4 services per day. Ferries depart from Tuen Mun at 7:45am and 10:15am. Return journeys depart Zhuhai at 9:00am and 8:45pm. The journey time is usually around 40 minutes, which is 30 minutes less than from the usual Tsim Sha Tsui or Sheung Wan services.

A one-way ticket to Zhuhai was HK$160, while a return ticket is HK$145.

On 10 October 2007, HKNWEL announced that the Zhuhai service has ceased operation until further notice.

==== Shekou ====
Ferry service to Shekou is currently suspended.

==== Shenzhen ====
Shenzhen Airport operated by TurboJet.

== Destinations ==
Destination	Operator	Ferry Pier Name
Tung Chung - Sha Lo Wan - Tai O	Fortune Ferry	Tung Chung New Development Ferry Pier, Sha Lo Wan Pier, Tai O Public Pier
Tuen Mun - Hong Kong International Airport - Zhuhai	TurboJet	Skypier, Port of Zhuhai

== Light Rail ==
Tuen Mun Ferry Pier stop (Chinese: 屯門碼頭站) is the name given to the southern terminus of MTR Light Rail. It is in Zone 1 for single-ride ticket.

The stop consists of 7 platforms, which contains 6 Light Rail routes and a termination platform. It also includes the customer services centre opening from 7:30 to 21:00. The centre is the only Light Rail customer services centre to sell Intercity Through Train tickets from Kowloon (Hung Hom) to mainland China destinations of Guangzhou, Dongguan, Shanghai and Beijing.

Light Rail routes:

- 507 to Tin King (via Tuen Mun station)
- 610 to Yuen Long (via Tai Hing Estate, Tuen Mun Hospital, Siu Hong station)
- 614 to Yuen Long (via Town Centre, San Hui, Siu Hong station)
- 614P to Siu Hong (via Town Centre, San Hui)
- 615 to Yuen Long (via Leung King, Siu Hong station)
- 615P to Siu Hong (via Leung King)

== Related developments ==
=== Pierhead Garden ===
Pierhead Garden is a private housing estate which consists of 6 towers, a swimming pool and a playground. It is built on the 2nd floor balcony above the mall and the transit hub.

=== Ocean Walk ===
Formerly called Pierhead Plaza, Ocean Walk is a shopping arcade with two seafood restaurants, one fast food restaurant, one supermarket and two health and cosmetic shops. It was extensively renovated between Spring 2005 and early summer of 2006, at which point it was renamed Ocean Walk, chosen from 80 entries in a naming competition held among KCR Corporation staff.

== See also ==
- Transport in Hong Kong
