= Goodview Garden stop =

Light rail stop in Tuen Mun, Hong Kong

Coordinates: 22°23′00″N 113°58′22″E

Goodview Garden 豐景園
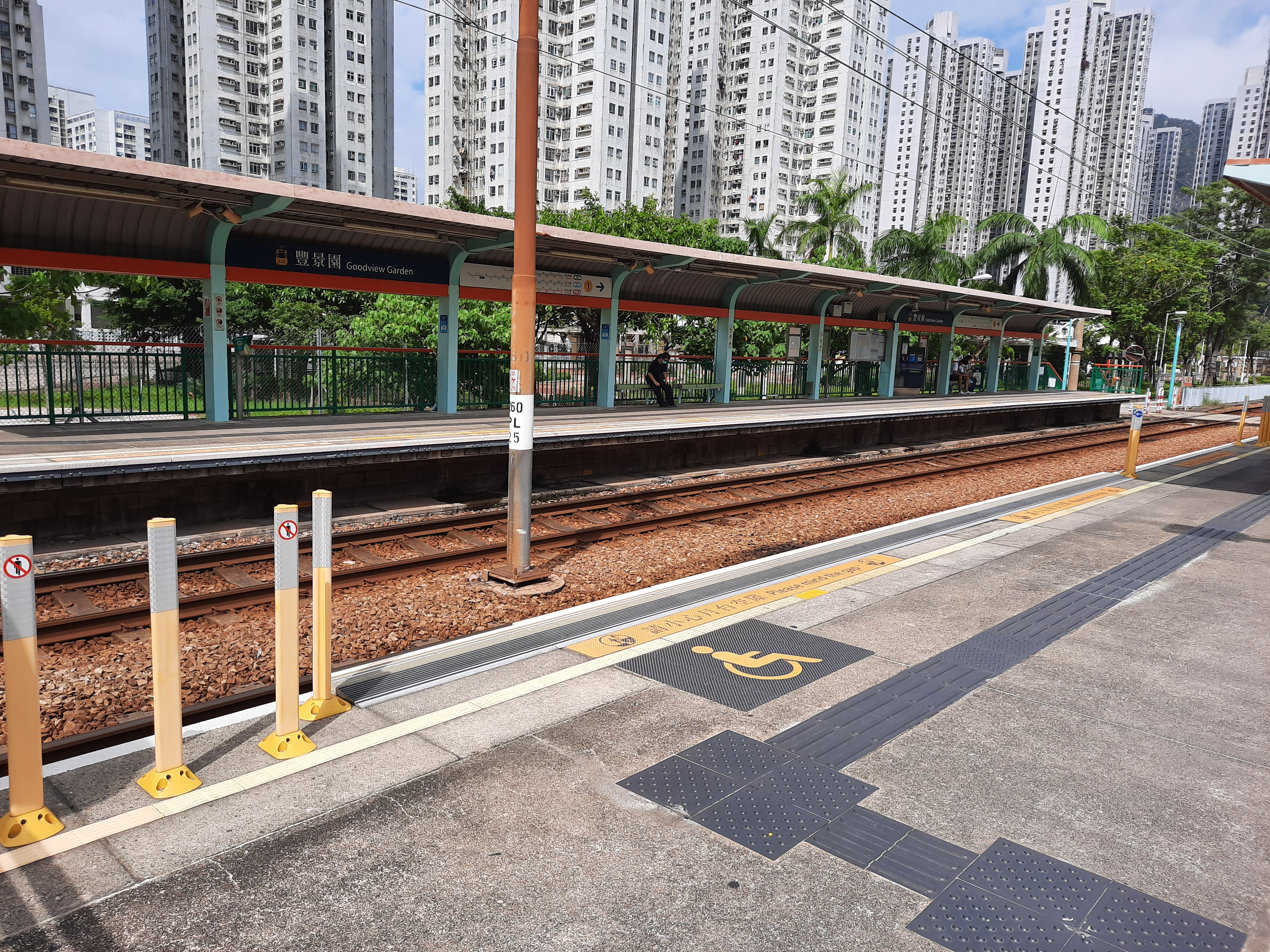
- Goodview Garden stop platform

General information
- Location: Goodview Garden; Tuen Mun District; Hong Kong
- System: MTR Light Rail stop
- Owner: KCR Corporation
- Operator: MTR Corporation
- Line: 507 614 614P
- Platforms: 2 side platforms
- Tracks: 2
- Connections: Bus, minibus

Construction
- Structure type: At-grade
- Accessible: yes

Other information
- Station code: GOG (English code); 260 (Digital code)
- Fare zone: 1

History
- Opened: 17 November 1991; 34 years ago

Services
Preceding stop	MTR Light Rail	Following stop
Hoi Wong Road towards Tuen Mun Ferry Pier	507	Siu Lun towards Tin King
Hoi Wong Road towards Tuen Mun Ferry Pier	614	Siu Lun towards Yuen Long
Hoi Wong Road towards Tuen Mun Ferry Pier	614P	Siu Lun towards Siu Hong
Location
- Location within MTR

Goodview Garden (Chinese: 豐景園) is an MTR Light Rail stop located at ground level between Hoi Chu Road and Hang Fu Street, south of Goodview Garden and east of Oceania Heights in Tuen Mun District. It began service on 17 November 1991 and belongs to Zone 1. It serves Goodview Garden, Oceania Heights and nearby areas.
