= On Ting stop =

Coordinates: 22°23′16″N 113°58′30″E

On Ting 安定
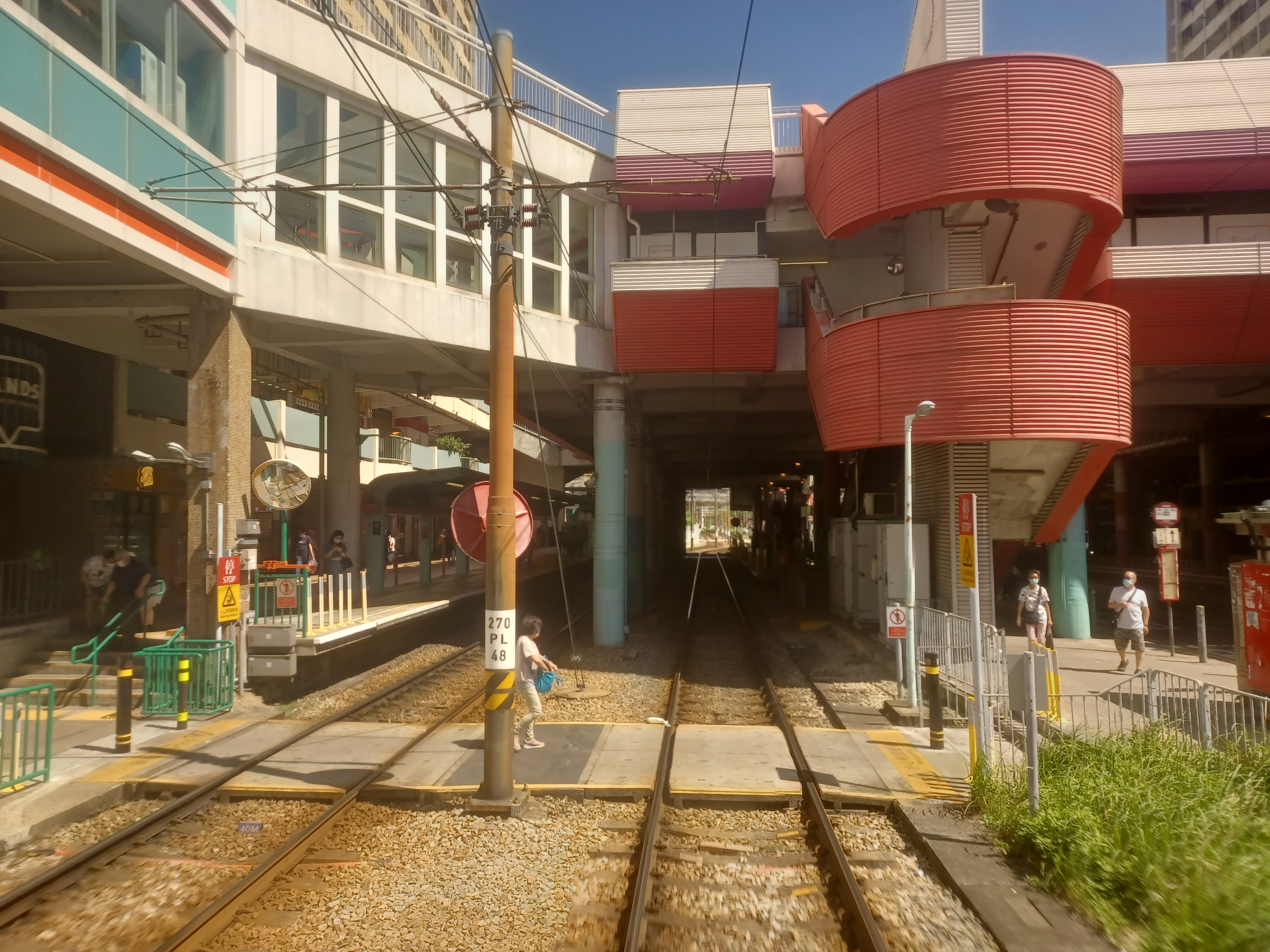
- On Ting stop

General information
- Location: Yau Oi Estate; Tuen Mun District; Hong Kong
- System: MTR Light Rail stop
- Owner: KCR Corporation
- Operator: MTR Corporation
- Line: 505 507 614 614P 751
- Platforms: 2 side platforms
- Tracks: 2
- Connections: Bus, minibus

Construction
- Structure type: At-grade
- Accessible: yes

Other information
- Station code: ONT (English code); 270 (Digital code)
- Fare zone: 2

History
- Opened: 18 September 1988; 37 years ago

Services
Preceding stop	MTR Light Rail	Following stop
Siu Lun towards Sam Shing	505	Town Centre towards Siu Hong
Town Centre towards Tin King	507	Siu Lun towards Tuen Mun Ferry Pier
Siu Lun towards Tuen Mun Ferry Pier	614	Town Centre towards Yuen Long
Siu Lun towards Tuen Mun Ferry Pier	614P	Town Centre towards Siu Hong
Yau Oi Terminus	751	Town Centre towards Tin Yat
Location
- Location within MTR

On Ting (Chinese: 安定) is an MTR Light Rail stop located at ground level at Tuen Mun Heung Sze Wui Road between On Ting Estate and Yau Oi Estate, in Tuen Mun District. It began service on 18 September 1988 and belongs to Zone 2.

Currently, route 751 only serves this stop in Tin Yat direction. On Ting stop was originally the terminus of Light Rail routes until 2 February 1992, when Siu Lun stop was opened. Route 507 was extended to Tuen Mun Ferry Pier stop, routes 506 and 612 (both now cancelled) were diverted to Yau Oi, and On Ting station lost its terminus status.
