= Siu Lun stop =

Light rail stop in Tuen Mun, Hong Kong

Coordinates: 22°23′04″N 113°58′31″E

Siu Lun 兆麟
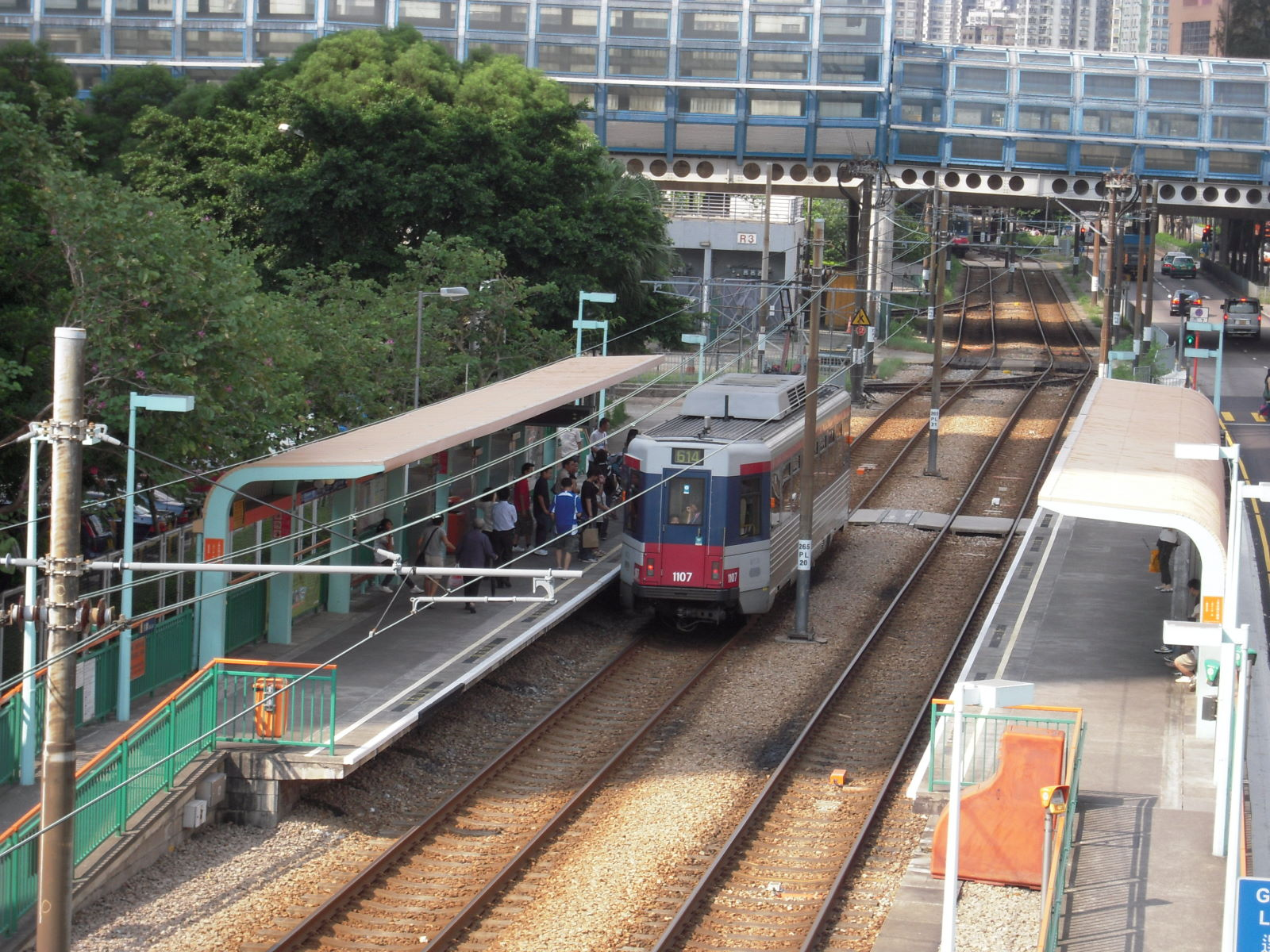
- Siu Lun stop platform

General information
- Location: Siu Lun Court and Tsui Ning Garden; Tuen Mun District; Hong Kong
- System: MTR Light Rail stop
- Owner: KCR Corporation
- Operator: MTR Corporation
- Line: 505 507 614 614P
- Platforms: 2 (2 side platforms)
- Tracks: 2
- Connections: Bus, minibus

Construction
- Structure type: At-grade
- Accessible: yes

Other information
- Station code: SLU (English code); 265 (Digital code)
- Fare zone: 1

History
- Opened: 17 November 1991; 34 years ago

Services
Preceding stop	MTR Light Rail	Following stop
Sam Shing Terminus	505	On Ting towards Siu Hong
On Ting towards Tin King	507	Goodview Garden towards Tuen Mun Ferry Pier
Goodview Garden towards Tuen Mun Ferry Pier	614	On Ting towards Yuen Long
Goodview Garden towards Tuen Mun Ferry Pier	614P	On Ting towards Siu Hong
Location
- Location within MTR

Siu Lun (Chinese: 兆麟) is an MTR Light Rail stop located at ground level at Tuen Mun Heung Sze Wui Road between Siu Lun Court and Tsui Ning Garden in Tuen Mun District. It began service on 17 November 1991 and belongs to Zone 1. It serves Siu Lun Court and Tsui Ning Garden.
