= Kin Sang stop =

Coordinates: 22°24′24″N 113°58′09″E

Kin Sang 建生
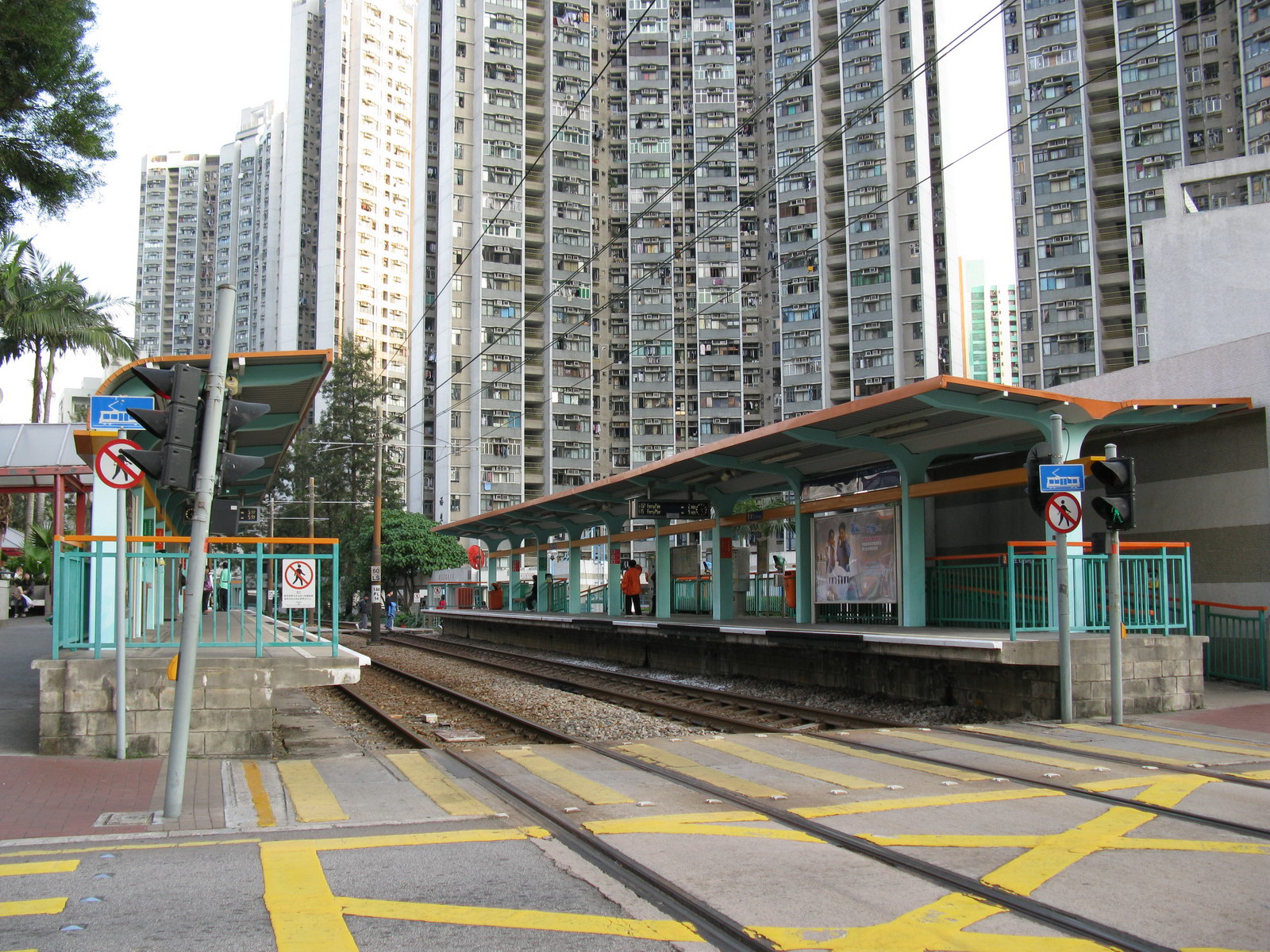
- Kin Sang stop's platform

General information
- Location: Kin Sang Estate; Tuen Mun District; Hong Kong
- System: MTR Light Rail stop
- Owner: KCR Corporation
- Operator: MTR Corporation
- Line: 505 615 615P
- Platforms: 2 side platforms
- Tracks: 2
- Connections: Bus, minibus

Construction
- Structure type: At-grade
- Accessible: yes

Other information
- Station code: KIS (English code); 130 (Digital code)
- Fare zone: 3

History
- Opened: 24 September 1988; 37 years ago

Services
Preceding stop	MTR Light Rail	Following stop
Tin King towards Sam Shing	505	Ching Chung towards Siu Hong
Tin King towards Tuen Mun Ferry Pier	615	Ching Chung towards Yuen Long
Tin King towards Tuen Mun Ferry Pier	615P	Ching Chung towards Siu Hong
Location
- Location within MTR

Kin Sang (Chinese: 建生) is an at-grade MTR Light Rail stop located at Leung Wan Street in Tuen Mun District, near Kin Sang Shopping Centre in Kin Sang Estate. It began service on 24 September 1988 and belongs to Zone 3. It serves the Kin Sang Estate and nearby residential buildings.
