= Affluence stop =

Light rail stop in Tuen Mun, Hong Kong

Coordinates: 22°24′12″N 113°58′32″E

Affluence 澤豐
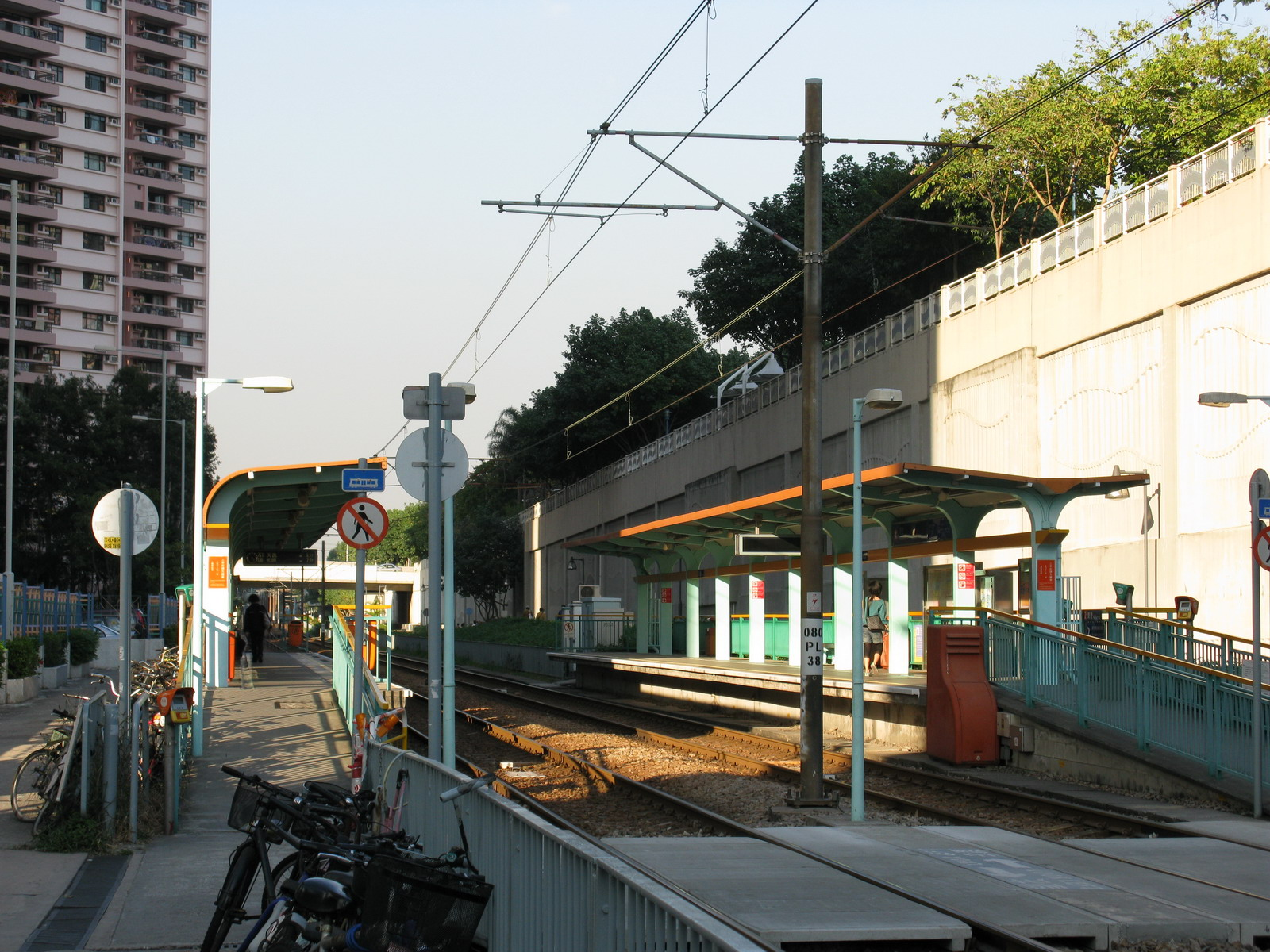
- Affluence stop's Platform

General information
- Location: Affluence Garden; Tuen Mun District, Hong Kong
- System: MTR Light Rail stop
- Owner: KCR Corporation
- Operator: MTR Corporation
- Line: 610 751
- Platforms: 2 side platforms
- Tracks: 2
- Connections: Bus, minibus

Construction
- Structure type: At-grade
- Accessible: yes

Other information
- Station code: AFF (English code); 080 (Digital code)
- Fare zone: 2

History
- Opened: 18 September 1988; 37 years ago

Services
| Preceding stop | MTR Light Rail | Following stop |
|---|---|---|
| Ngan Wai towards Tuen Mun Ferry Pier | 610 | Tuen Mun Hospital towards Yuen Long |
| Choy Yee Bridge towards Yau Oi | 751 | Tuen Mun Hospital towards Tin Yat |
Location
- Location within MTR

Affluence (Chinese: 澤豐), formerly Ho King (Chinese: 河景), is an at-grade MTR Light Rail stop located between Affluence Garden and Tuen Mun River in Tuen Mun District. It began service on 18 September 1988 and belongs to Zone 2.
