= Butterfly stop =

Light rail stop in Tuen Mun, Hong Kong

Coordinates: 22°22′41″N 113°57′42″E

Butterfly 蝴蝶
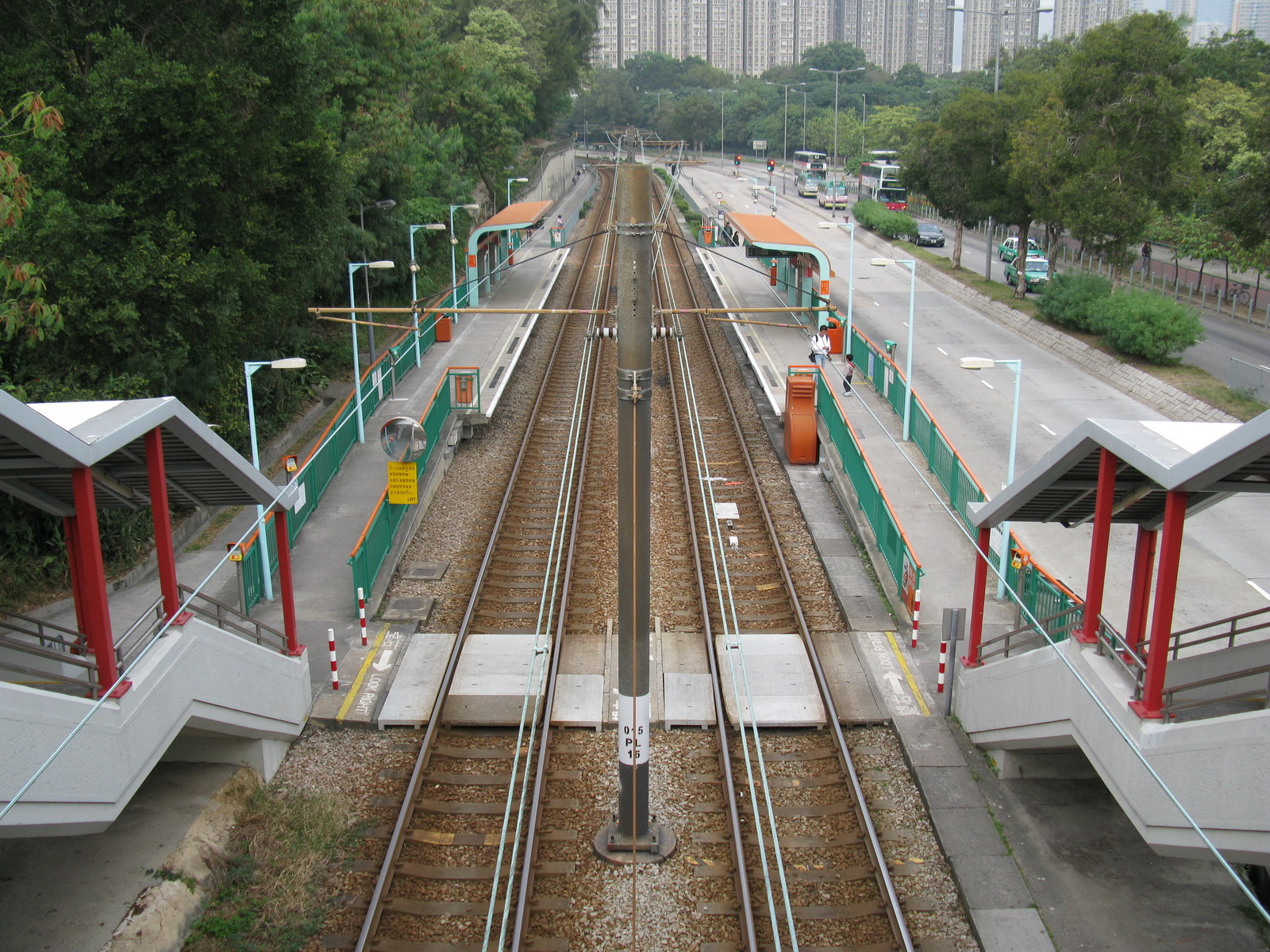
- Butterfly stop's Platform

General information
- Location: Butterfly Estate; Tuen Mun District, Hong Kong
- System: MTR Light Rail stop
- Owner: KCR Corporation
- Operator: MTR Corporation
- Line: 610 615 615P
- Platforms: 2 side platforms
- Tracks: 2
- Connections: Bus, minibus

Construction
- Structure type: At-grade
- Accessible: yes

Other information
- Station code: BUT (English code); 015 (Digital code)
- Fare zone: 1

History
- Opened: 18 September 1988; 37 years ago

Services
Preceding stop	MTR Light Rail	Following stop
Melody Garden towards Tuen Mun Ferry Pier	610	Light Rail Depot towards Yuen Long
Melody Garden towards Tuen Mun Ferry Pier	615	Light Rail Depot towards Yuen Long
Melody Garden towards Tuen Mun Ferry Pier	615P	Light Rail Depot towards Siu Hong
Location
- Location within MTR

Butterfly (Chinese: 蝴蝶) is an MTR Light Rail stop. It is located at ground level at Lung Mun Road, near Butterfly Estate and Siu Shan Court, in Tuen Mun District. It began service on 18 September 1988 and belongs to Zone 1.
