= Tuen Mun Park =

Public park in Tuen Mun, Hong Kong

Coordinates: 22.39209°N 113.97372°E

- 屯門公園
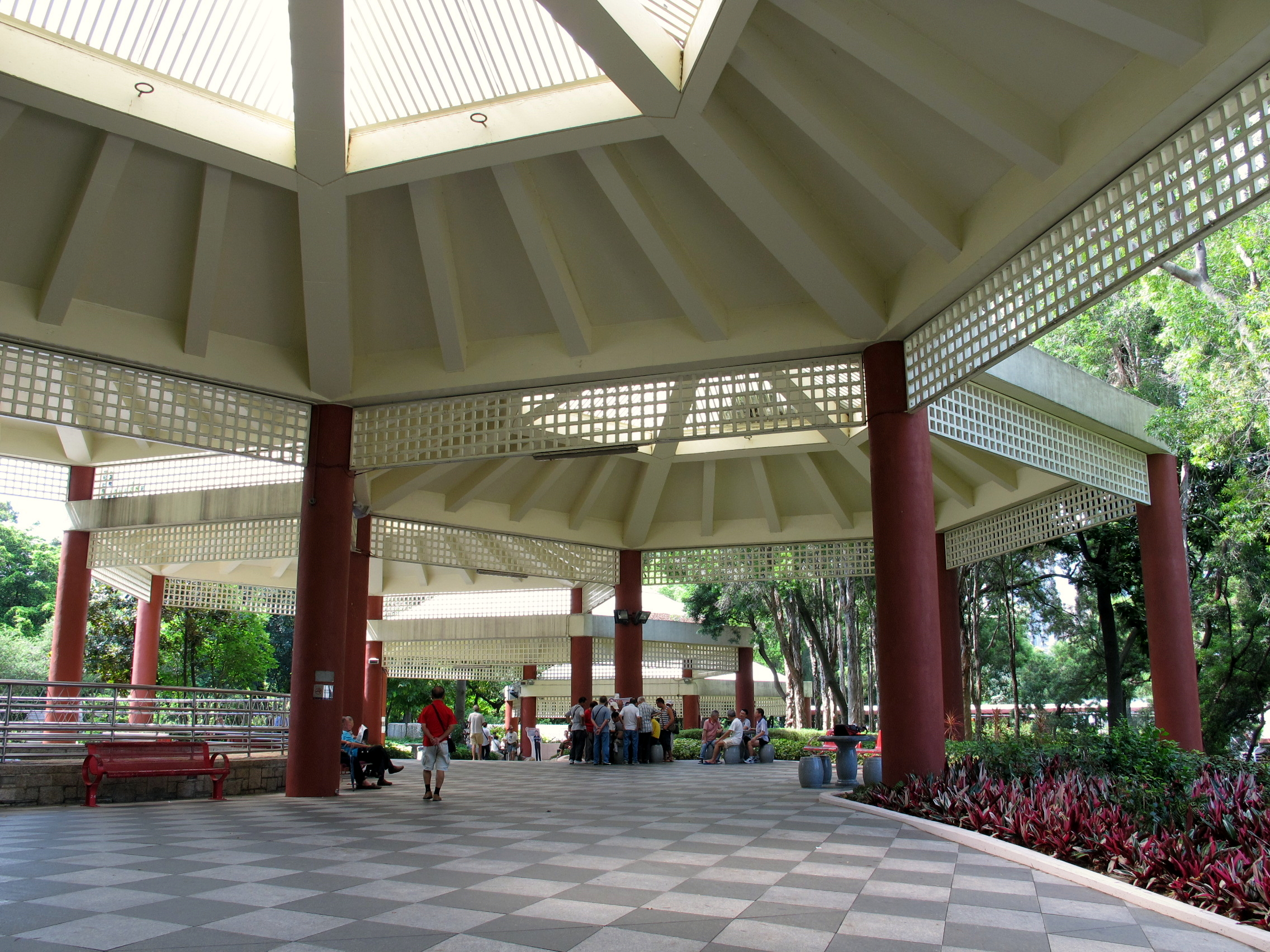
- Entrance pavilion
- Type: Public park
- Location: Tuen Mun New Town
- Area: 12.5 hectares (31 acres)
- Opened: 29 August 1985; 40 years ago (Phase I); August 1988; 37 years ago (Phase II); 2 January 1991; 35 years ago (Phase III)
- Operator: Leisure and Cultural Services Department
- Public transit: Town Centre stop (Light Rail); Tuen Mun station (Tuen Ma)

Tuen Mun Park (Chinese: 屯門公園), formerly known as Tuen Mun Town Park, is located in Tuen Mun, Hong Kong. It is the largest town park in the New Territories, covering 12.5 hectares (31 acres).

The park sits between the Tuen Mun River and Tuen Mun Town Centre, near Tuen Mun Town Plaza, Tuen Mun Public Library and Tuen Mun Town Hall. It is next to Tuen Mun station and the Light Rail Town Centre stop.

== History ==
The town park was conceived in the 1970s alongside Tuen Mun's town centre. The land upon which the park sits was originally part of Castle Peak Bay, and was reclaimed from the sea in the 1970s. Before construction of the park began, the site was used as a temporary housing area in the interim. In November 1981, the Tuen Mun New Town Development Office commissioned a private consultant, EBC Hongkong, to lay out the park. It was designed with artificial lakes, "spectacular" water features, roller-skating areas, children's playgrounds, a café, and an area for model boats. The contract to construct the first phase of the park, valued at HK$32 million, was awarded in September 1983.

The park originally fell under the purview of the Regional Council. It won the Hong Kong Institute of Landscape Architects Silver Medal in 1990.

== Facilities ==
=== The Reptile House ===
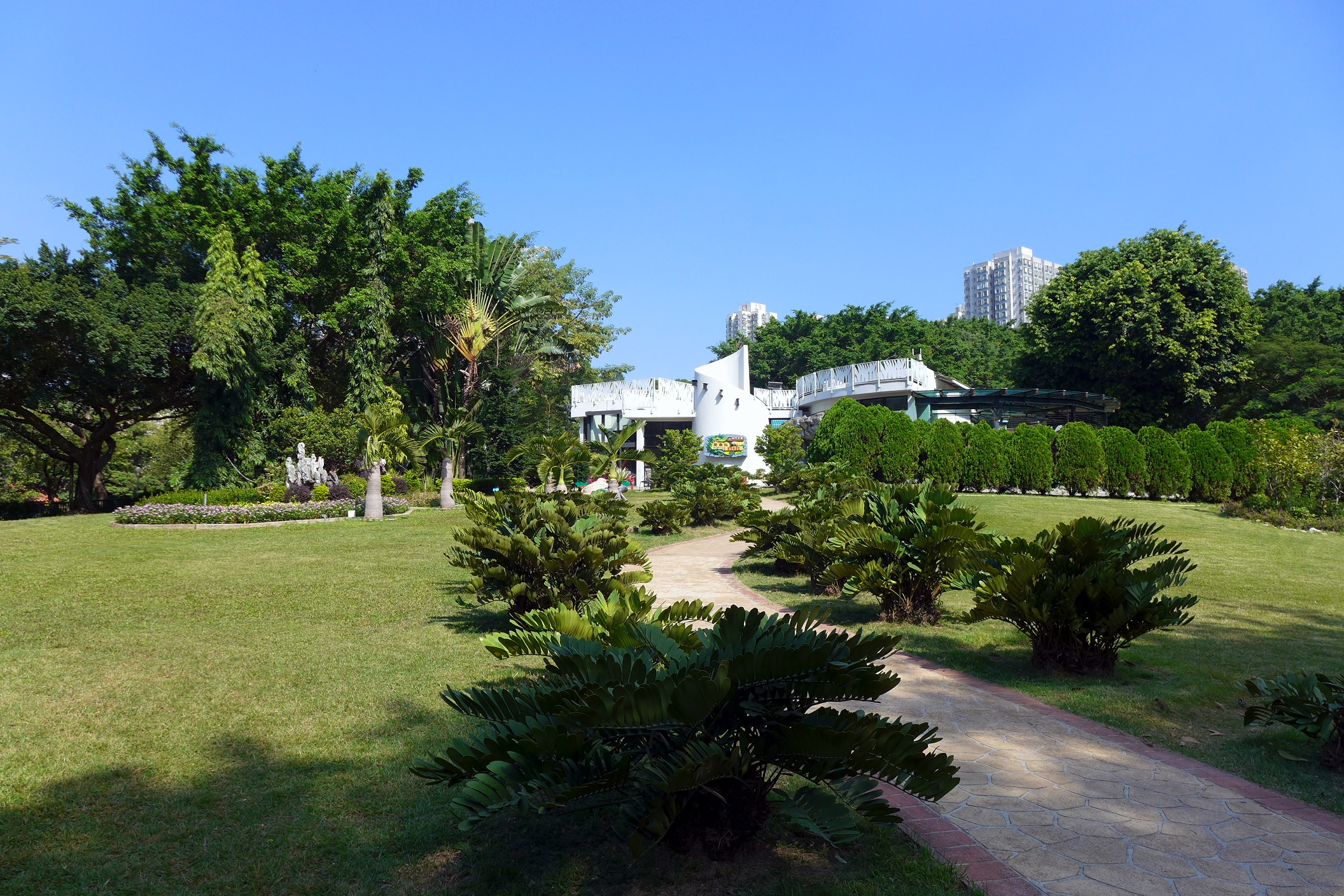
Reptile House

Opened in 1999, the Reptile House is one of the first of its kind in the Leisure and Cultural Services Department (LCSD). It is situated at the turfed area in the southern part of the park and has a floor area of about 245 square metres. Facilities in the Reptile House include indoor terraria and a courtyard terrarium where various species of reptiles are displayed. At present, there are 20 species in 43 live exhibits displayed in the House. Graphic display of relevant information and 7 reptile models are also provided. With its annual patronage of 400,000 (including 75,000 group visitors), the Reptile House is becoming one of the major vantage points in the park.

Species include: bearded dragon, Cuban anole, boa constrictor, veiled chameleon, western painted turtle, Tokay gecko, leopard gecko, star tortoise, spurred tortoise, iguana, Thai water dragon, ball python, blue-tongued skink, spectacled caiman.

=== Other features ===
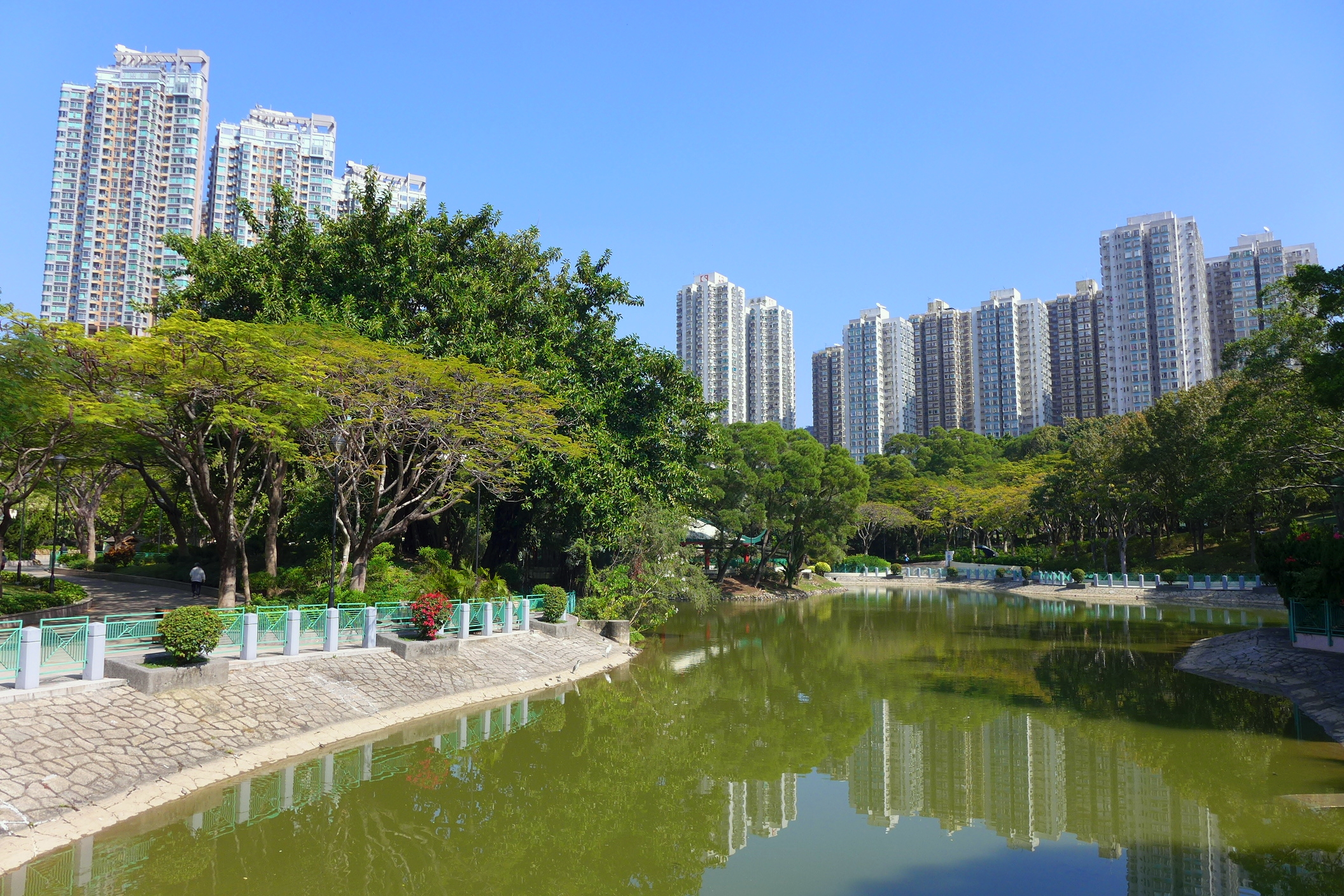
Artificial lake

- Amphitheatre
- Artificial lake
- Badminton/volleyball courts
- Canteen
- Children's playground
- Model boat pool
- Roller skating rink
- Water cascade

== Noise problem ==
The park has made headlines over controversy surrounding noise generated by musicians in the park. Neighbours of the park long complained of the noise nuisance, while others defended the primarily retired singers who congregated in the park. In 2006, the LCSD proposed to designate special areas in the park for singing and performance with no external amplification allowed, while singing groups complained that singing without amplification was akin to "cooking without salt". Nearby residents groups complained the plan was insufficient, with a Kam Wah Garden resident stating that the performances were a "poison to us all" and lamenting the perpetual need to close all the windows at home. A proposal to build a noise barrier was scrapped after the Architectural Services Department determined that the barrier would increase traffic noise by reflecting it back toward the residential area.

LCSD subsequently established a performance stage and two "self-entertainment zones" farther away from residential blocks in an effort to mitigate the problem. However, amplifiers are still used, leading to continued noise complaints, and performances continue to take place elsewhere in the park.

=== Protests ===
As of 2019 the issue persists, leading to continued controversy. Many of the singers are now dai ma (大媽), scantily clad "dancing aunties" who sing in Mandarin Chinese using amplifiers. They have been accused of begging and prostitution, and of attracting lecherous older men to the park, scaring away other park users. These men reward the singing and dancing dai ma with lai see, red packets containing cash. On 6 July 2019, a protest against the dai ma was held. Thousands of protesters marched down Tuen Mun Heung Sze Wui Road and into the park, chanting slogans such as "reclaim Tuen Mun, give me a quiet park!". They accused the LCSD and police of failing to tackle the noise problem through law enforcement. They also called for the "self-entertainment zones" to be scrapped, alleging that they attracted noisy performers to the park from other districts of Hong Kong.

On 9 July 2019, the Tuen Mun District Council unanimously passed a motion calling to discontinue the "self-entertainment zones" and to step up law enforcement at the park. Later that day, the LCSD announced that the zones would be scrapped in September of that year.

Against the backdrop of the intensifying 2019–20 Hong Kong protests, another march was held on 21 September 2019 by protesters who alleged that the dai ma had returned to the park. Police had initially banned the event, but the ban was overturned on appeal. Tuen Mun station was pre-emptively closed by the police. Protesters marched from San Wo Lane Playground, through Tuen Mun Park, to the Tuen Mun Government Offices, where they burned the flag of the People's Republic of China. The police cut the event short and undertook a "dispersal operation", firing tear gas and sponge grenade rounds at protesters, some of whom threw Molotov cocktails. Light rail and MTR bus services in the area were subsequently suspended. Protests spread to the nearby town of Yuen Long that evening, marking the two-month anniversary of the July attacks that took place there.

Another protest against the dai ma was held on 23 February 2020. Police fired pepper spray and arrested one.

== Transport ==
The park is next to two railway stations. It can be accessed via Exit B of Tuen Mun station, the terminus of the Tuen Ma line, which goes to Kowloon. It is also adjacent to Town Centre stop of the light rail system. There is also a bus terminus at Tuen Mun Town Centre served by many routes.
