= On Ting =

On Ting may refer to:

- On Ting Estate, a public housing estate in Tuen Mun, Hong Kong
- On Ting stop, an MTR Light Rail stop adjacent to the estate
