= Tuen Mun Hospital stop =

Railway station in Hong Kong

Coordinates: 22°24′28″N 113°58′37″E

Tuen Mun Hospital 屯門醫院
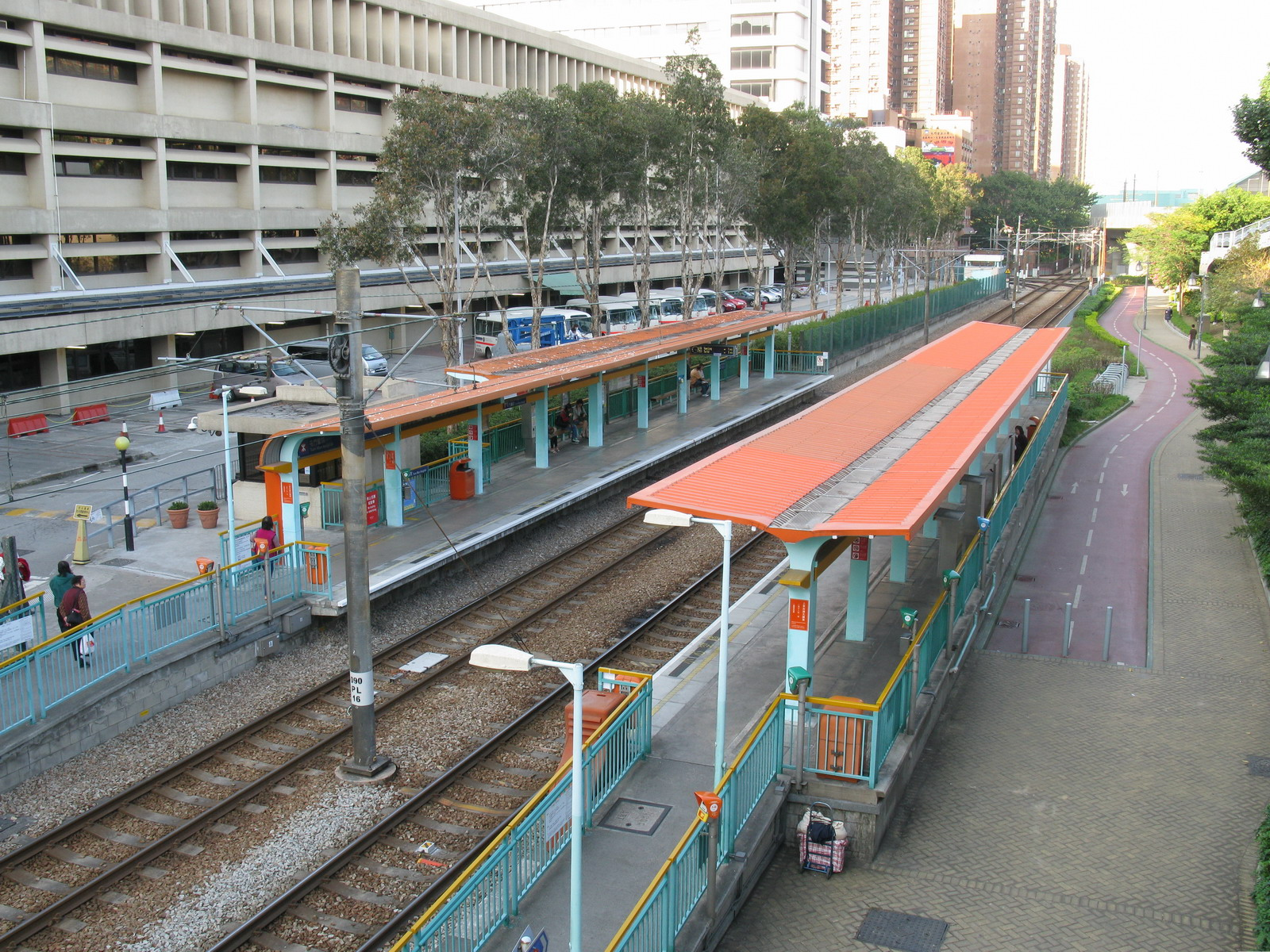
- Tuen Mun Hospital stop's Platform

General information
- Location: Tuen Mun Hospital; Tuen Mun District; Hong Kong
- System: MTR Light Rail stop
- Owner: KCR Corporation
- Operator: MTR Corporation
- Line: 610 751
- Platforms: 2 side platforms
- Tracks: 2
- Connections: Bus, minibus

Construction
- Structure type: At-grade
- Accessible: yes

Other information
- Station code: TMH (English code); 090 (Digital code)
- Fare zone: 3

History
- Opened: 18 September 1988; 37 years ago

Services
Preceding stop	MTR Light Rail	Following stop
Affluence towards Tuen Mun Ferry Pier	610	Siu Hong towards Yuen Long
Affluence towards Yau Oi	751	Siu Hong towards Tin Yat
Location
- Location within MTR

Tuen Mun Hospital (Chinese: 屯門醫院) is an at-grade MTR Light Rail stop located between Tuen Mun Hospital and Tuen Mun River in Tuen Mun District. It began service on 18 September 1988 and belongs to Zone 3. It serves Tuen Mun Hospital and nearby areas.
