= Melody Garden stop =

Light rail stop in Tuen Mun, Hong Kong

Coordinates: 22°22′28″N 113°57′42″E

Melody Garden 美樂
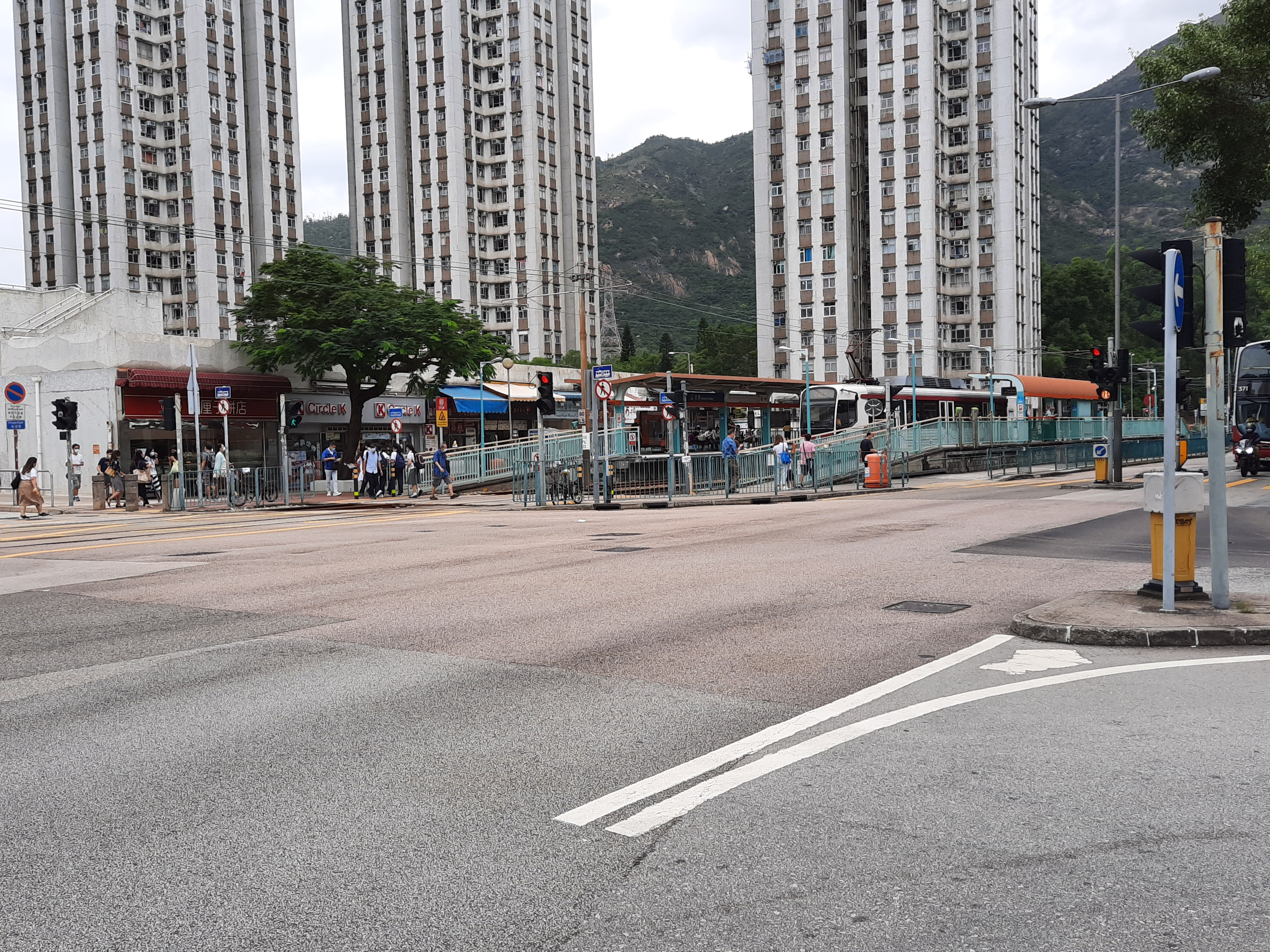
- Melody Garden stop's Platform

General information
- Location: Melody Garden; Tuen Mun District; Hong Kong
- System: MTR Light Rail stop
- Owner: KCR Corporation
- Operator: MTR Corporation
- Line: 610 615 615P
- Platforms: 2 side platforms
- Tracks: 2
- Connections: Bus, minibus

Construction
- Structure type: At-grade
- Accessible: yes

Other information
- Station code: MEG (English code); 010 (Digital code)
- Fare zone: 1

History
- Opened: 18 September 1988; 37 years ago

Services
Preceding stop	MTR Light Rail	Following stop
Tuen Mun Ferry Pier Terminus	610	Butterfly towards Yuen Long
Tuen Mun Ferry Pier Terminus	615	Butterfly towards Yuen Long
Tuen Mun Ferry Pier Terminus	615P	Butterfly towards Siu Hong
Location
- Location within MTR

Melody Garden (Chinese: 美樂) is an MTR Light Rail stop. It is located at ground level at Wu Chui Road between Melody Garden and Butterfly Estate in Tuen Mun District. It began service on 18 September 1988 and belongs to Zone 1.
