= Kei Lun stop =

Hong Kong MTR Light Rail stop

Coordinates: 22°24′38″N 113°58′35″E

Kei Lun 麒麟
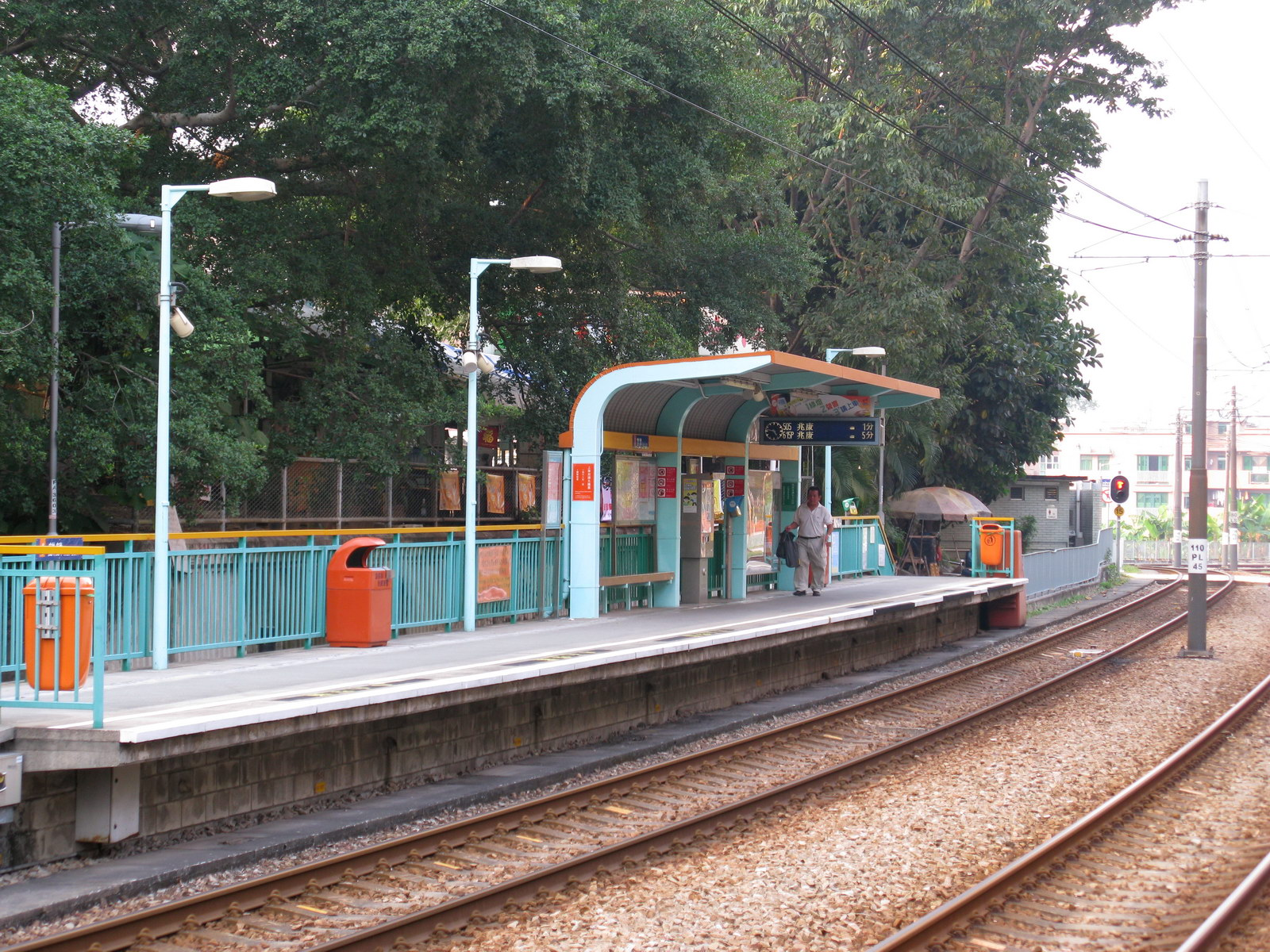
- Kei Lun stop's platform

General information
- Location: Kei Lun Wai; Tuen Mun District; Hong Kong
- System: MTR Light Rail stop
- Owner: KCR Corporation
- Operator: MTR Corporation
- Line: 505 615P
- Platforms: 2 side platforms
- Tracks: 2
- Connections: Bus, minibus

Construction
- Structure type: At-grade
- Accessible: yes

Other information
- Station code: KEL (English code); 110 (Digital code)
- Fare zone: 3

History
- Opened: 18 September 1988; 37 years ago

Services
Preceding stop	MTR Light Rail	Following stop
Ching Chung One-way operation	505	Siu Hong Terminus
Ching Chung towards Tuen Mun Ferry Pier	615P	Siu Hong Terminus
Location
- Location within MTR

Kei Lun (Chinese: 麒麟) is an at-grade MTR Light Rail stop located at Tsing Lun Road in Tuen Mun District, near Kei Lun Wai. It opened on 18 September 1988 and belongs to Zone 3.

The stop is served by routes 505 and 615P. Unusually among Light Rail stops, northbound route 505 trains to Siu Hong stop here, but southbound trains to Sam Shing do not.
