= Kin Sang =

Kin Sang may refer to:

== Places ==
- Kin Sang Estate, a public housing estate in Tuen Mun, Hong Kong
- Kin Sang stop, an MTR Light Rail stop adjacent to the estate

== People ==
- Loong Kin Sang (born 1944), Cantonese opera performer from Hong Kong
