= Lam Tei stop =

Hong Kong Light Rail stop

Coordinates: 22.418553°N 113.981859°E

Lam Tei 藍地
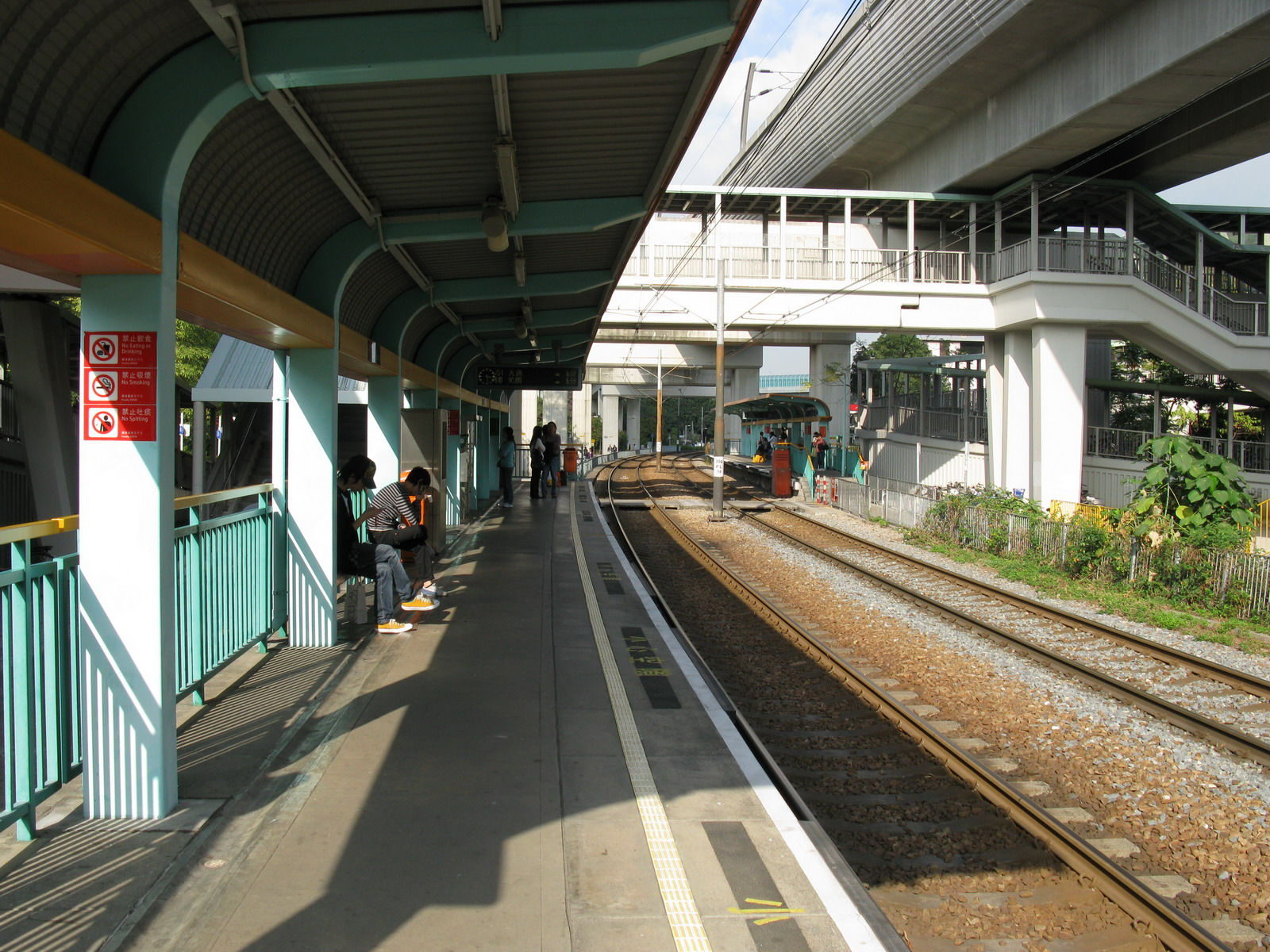
- Lam Tei stop's Platform

General information
- Location: Lam Tei; Tuen Mun District; Hong Kong
- System: MTR Light Rail stop
- Owner: KCR Corporation
- Operator: MTR Corporation
- Line: 610 614 615 751
- Platforms: 2 side platforms
- Tracks: 2
- Connections: Bus, minibus

Construction
- Structure type: At-grade
- Accessible: yes

Other information
- Station code: LTE (English code); 350 (Digital code)
- Fare zone: 3

History
- Opened: 18 September 1988; 37 years ago

Services
Preceding stop	MTR Light Rail	Following stop
Siu Hong towards Tuen Mun Ferry Pier	610	Nai Wai towards Yuen Long
Siu Hong towards Tuen Mun Ferry Pier	614	Nai Wai towards Yuen Long
Siu Hong towards Tuen Mun Ferry Pier	615	Nai Wai towards Yuen Long
Siu Hong towards Yau Oi	751	Nai Wai towards Tin Yat
Location
- Location within MTR

Lam Tei (Chinese: 藍地) is an at-grade MTR Light Rail stop located at Castle Peak Road in Tuen Mun District, near Lam Tei. It began service on 18 September 1988 and belongs to Zone 3.
