= Ching Chung stop =

MTR Light Rail stop

Coordinates: 22°24′27″N 113°58′22″E

Ching Chung 青松
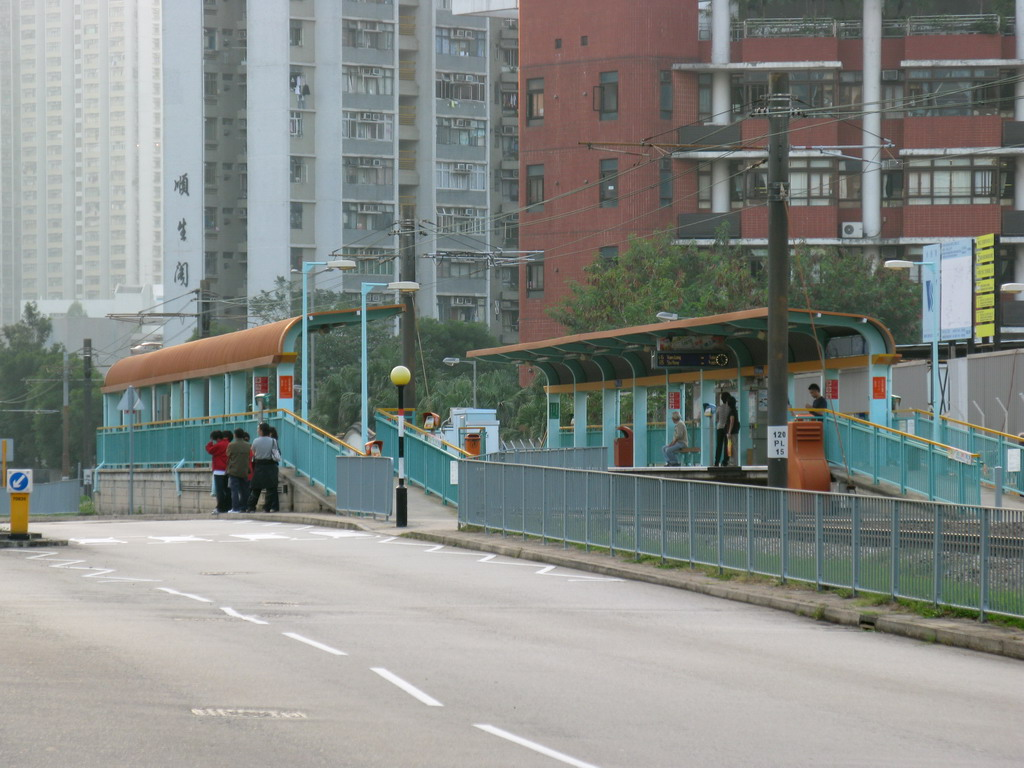
- Appearance of Ching Chung stop in November 2007

General information
- Location: Ching Chung Koon; Tuen Mun District; Hong Kong
- System: MTR Light Rail stop
- Owner: KCR Corporation
- Operator: MTR Corporation
- Line: 505 615 615P
- Platforms: 2 side platforms
- Tracks: 2
- Connections: Bus, minibus

Construction
- Structure type: At-grade
- Accessible: yes

Other information
- Station code: CHC (English code); 120 (Digital code)
- Fare zone: 3

History
- Opened: 24 September 1988; 37 years ago

Services
Preceding stop	MTR Light Rail	Following stop
Kin Sang towards Sam Shing	505	Kei Lun towards Siu Hong
Kin Sang towards Sam Shing	505	Siu Hong One-way operation
Kin Sang towards Tuen Mun Ferry Pier	615	Siu Hong towards Yuen Long
Kin Sang towards Tuen Mun Ferry Pier	615P	Kei Lun towards Siu Hong
Location
- Location within MTR

Ching Chung or Tsing Chung (Chinese: 青松) is an at-grade MTR Light Rail stop located at Tsing Lun Road in Tuen Mun District, near Ching Chung Koon. It commenced on 24 September 1988 and belongs to Zone 3. It serves the Ching Chung Koon and Castle Peak Hospital. It is on routes 505, 615, and 615P.

== See also ==
- Ching Chung Koon
