= Siu Lun =

Siu Lun may refer to:

== Places ==
- Siu Lun Court, a public housing estate in Tuen Mun, Hong Kong
- Siu Lun stop, an MTR Light Rail stop adjacent to the estate

== People ==
- Deric Wan Siu-lun (born 1964), Hong Kong actor
