= MTR Light Rail Route 505 =

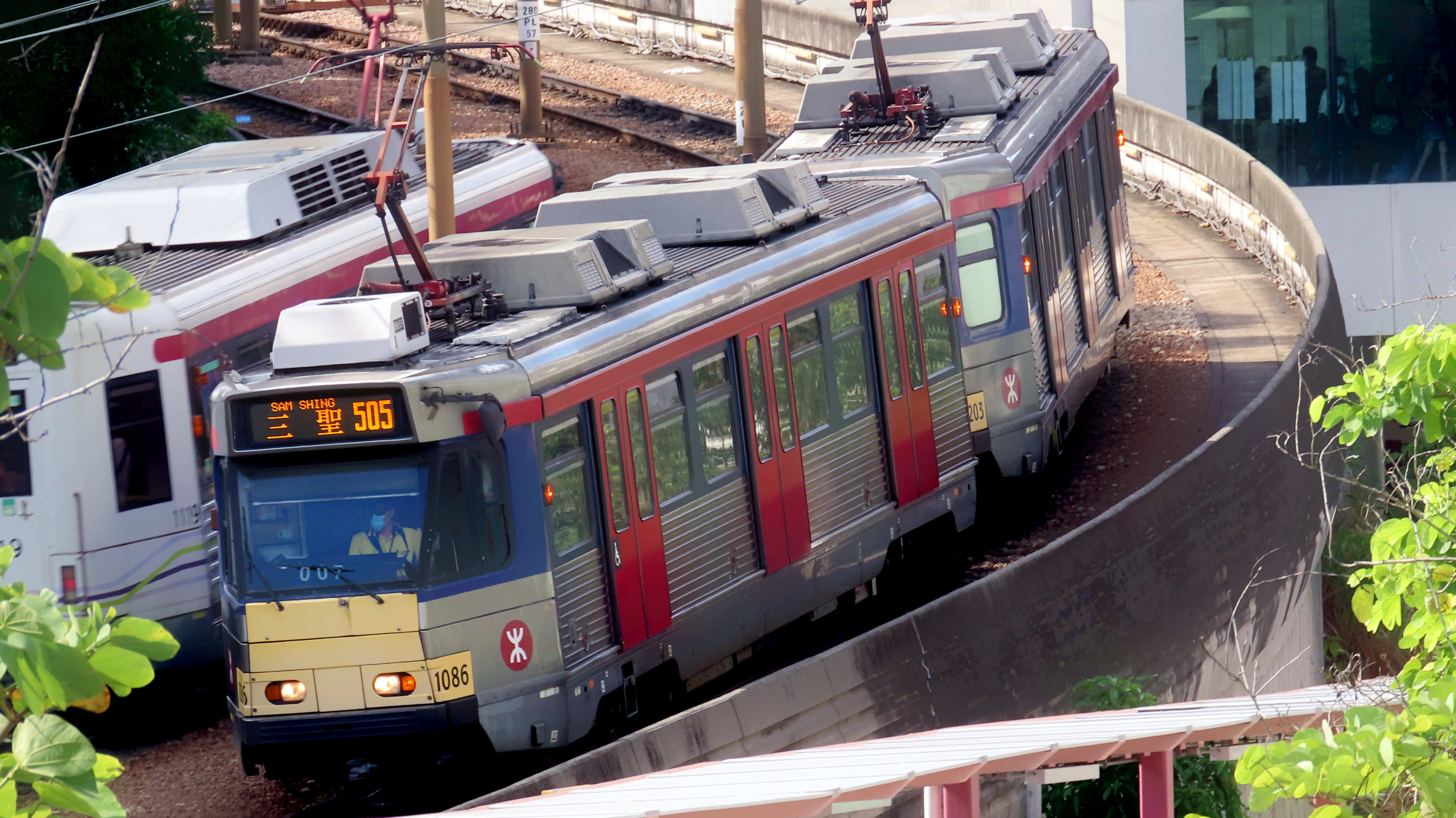
- A 505 Light Rail

Overview
- Owner: KCR Corporation
- Locale: Tuen Mun District
- Termini: Siu Hong; Sam Shing
- Stations: 17

Service
- System: MTR Light Rail
- Operator(s): MTR Corporation
- Depot(s): Tuen Mun Depot

History
- Opened: 24 September 1988; 36 years ago

Technical
- Character: At grade and Elevated
- Track gauge: 1,435 mm (4 ft 8 1/2 in) standard gauge
- Electrification: 750 V DC Overhead line
- Operating speed: 70 km/h (43 mph) (Maximum)

Route 505 is an MTR Light Rail route. It links Sam Shing stop and Siu Hong stop, in the southern and northern parts of Tuen Mun, Hong Kong, respectively.

The route is coloured red on the Light Rail system map. The route has three one-way segments: Kei Lun and Siu Hong are on a one-way clockwise loop at the northern end of the line; and in the middle of the route there is a split such that Shan King (North) and Shan King (South) are only served by northbound trains, and Ming Kum only by southbound trains.

The route began service on 24 September 1988, from Siu Hong to On Ting. At the time, the trains towards Siu Hong had a different number, 504. From 2 February 1992, the route was extended to Sam Shing.

== Stops ==
Name	Connections	Fare zone
Sam Shing	-	1
Siu Lun	507 614 614P	1
On Ting	507 614 614P 751	2
Town Centre	507 614 614P 751	2
Tuen Mun	507 751 Tuen Ma line (Tuen Mun Station)	2
Kin On	-	2
Shan King (North) (to Siu Hong only)	-	2
Shan King (South) (to Siu Hong only)	-	2
Ming Kum (to Sam Shing only)	610 615 615P	2
Shek Pai	610 615 615P	2
San Wai	507 615 615P	3
Leung King	507 615 615P	3
Tin King	507 (to Tuen Mun Ferry Pier only) 615 615P	3
Kin Sang	615 615P	3
Ching Chung	615 615P	3
Kei Lun (to Siu Hong only)	615P	3
Siu Hong	610 614 614P 615 615P 751 Tuen Ma line (Siu Hong station)	3
