= Tuen Mun Public Library =

Public library in Hong Kong

- 屯門公共圖書館
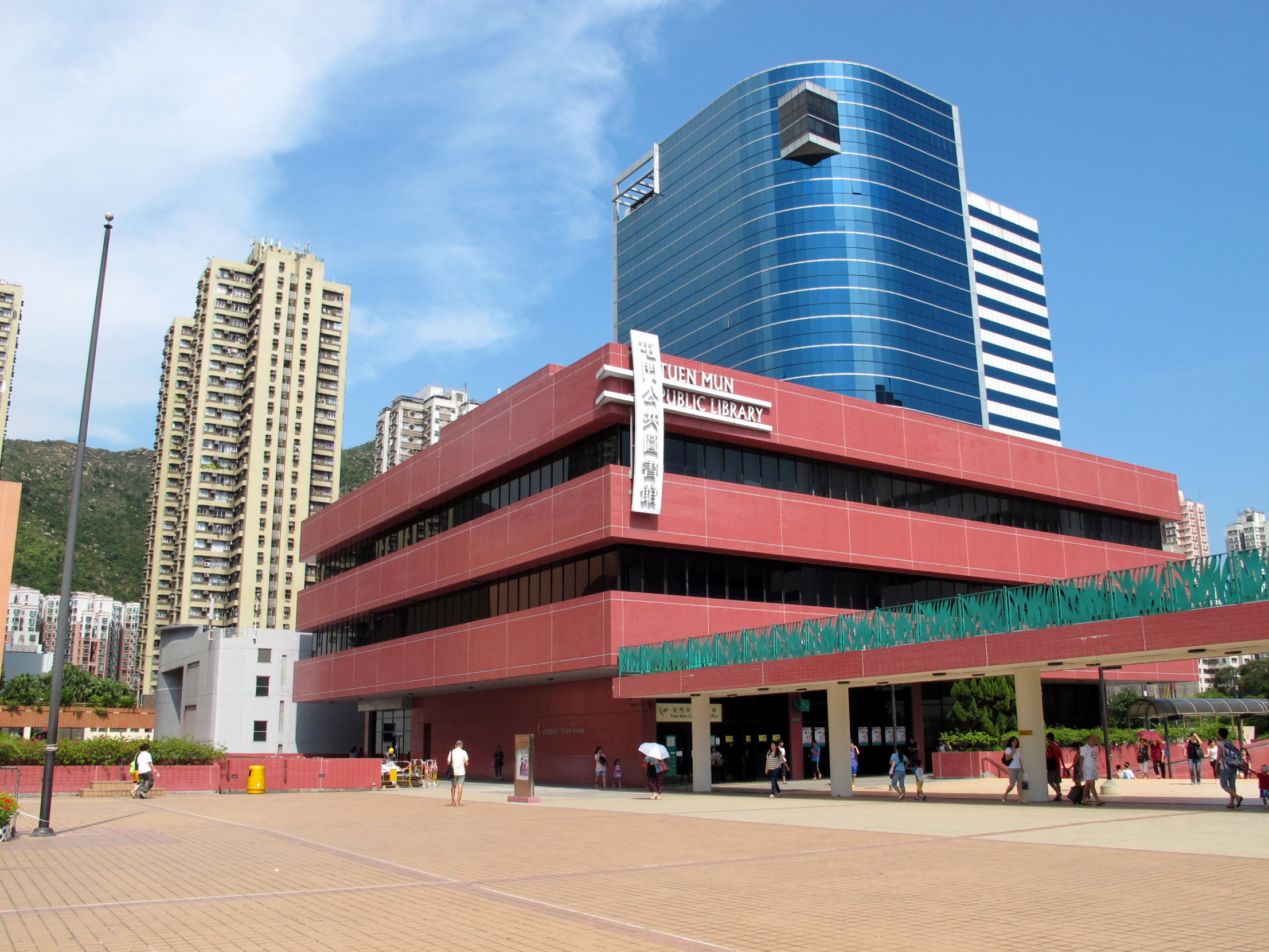
- 22.391156°N 113.976826°E
- Location: 1 Tuen Hi Road, Tuen Mun, Hong Kong
- Type: Public
- Established: 19 December 1989

Other information
- Parent organisation: Leisure and Cultural Services Department
- Affiliation: Hong Kong Public Libraries
- Website: www.hkpl.gov.hk/tc/locations/tuen-mun/library/tuen-mun.html

Tuen Mun Public Library
- Traditional Chinese: 屯門公共圖書館
Transcriptions
Yue: Cantonese
- Yale Romanization: Tyùhn mùhn gūng guhng tòuh syū gún
- Jyutping: tyun4 mun4 gung1 gung6 tou4 syu1 gun2

The Tuen Mun Public Library (Chinese: 屯門公共圖書館) is a public library located at 1 Tuen Hi Road, Tuen Mun, Hong Kong.

The Environmental Protection Department has an air quality monitoring station set up in the Tuen Mun Public Library.

== History ==
The Tuen Mun Public Library opened on 19 December 1989. At the time, the library was called the Tuen Mun Central Library (Chinese: 屯門中央圖書館) before its current name was adopted in 2001 to avoid confusion with Hong Kong Central Library.
