= Tin King stop =

Coordinates: 22°24′28″N 113°57′59″E

Tin King 田景
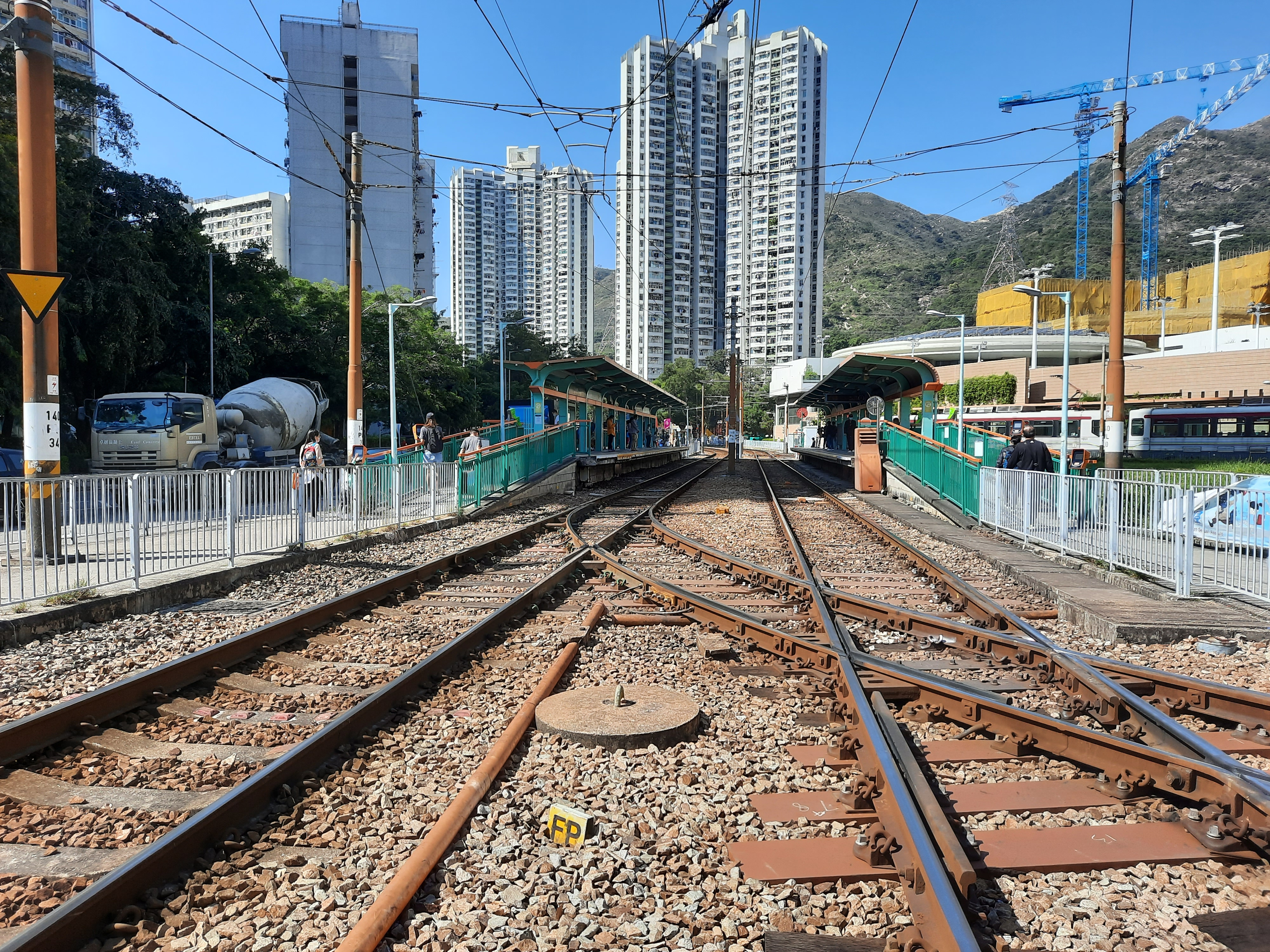
- Tin King stop's platform

General information
- Location: Tin King Estate; Tuen Mun District; Hong Kong
- System: MTR Light Rail stop
- Owner: KCR Corporation
- Operator: MTR Corporation
- Line: 505 507 615 615P
- Platforms: 3 side platforms
- Tracks: 3
- Connections: Bus, minibus

Construction
- Structure type: At-grade
- Accessible: yes

Other information
- Station code: TNK (English code); 140 (Digital code)
- Fare zone: 3

History
- Opened: 24 September 1988; 37 years ago

Services
Preceding stop	MTR Light Rail	Following stop
Leung King towards Sam Shing	505	Kin Sang towards Siu Hong
Terminus	507	Leung King towards Tuen Mun Ferry Pier
Leung King towards Tuen Mun Ferry Pier	615	Kin Sang towards Yuen Long
Leung King towards Tuen Mun Ferry Pier	615P	Kin Sang towards Siu Hong
Location
- Location within MTR

Tin King (Chinese: 田景) is an at-grade MTR Light Rail stop located at the junction of Ming Kum Road and Tin King Road in Tuen Mun District, near Siu Pong Court in Tin King Estate. It began service on 24 September 1988 and belongs to Zone 3. It serves the Tin King Estate, Siu Pong Court and Po Tin Estate.

This stop is the terminus of Route 507, and has a balloon loop for trains on that line.
