= Yau Oi stop =

Coordinates: 22°23′12″N 113°58′25″E

Yau Oi 友愛
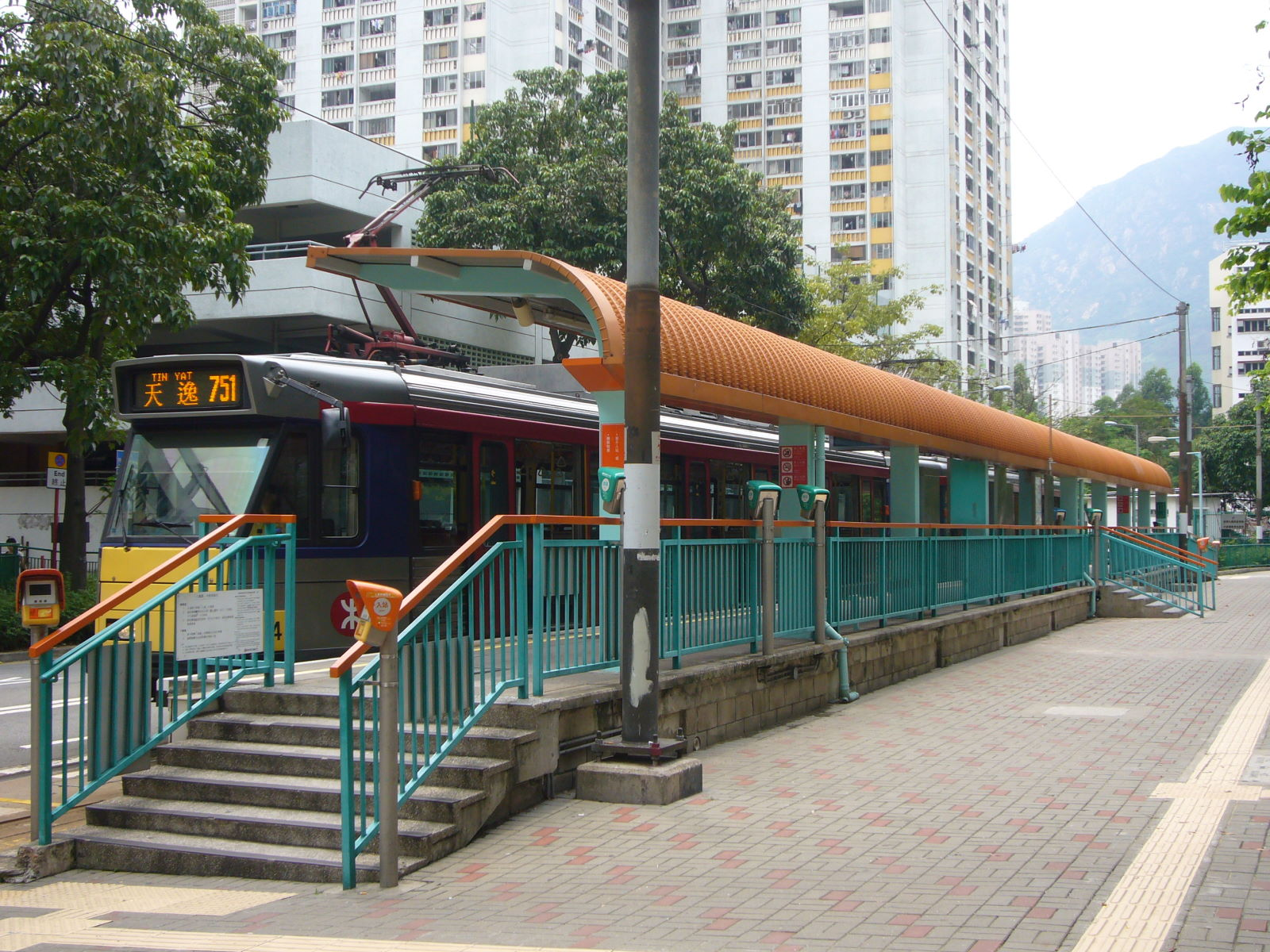
- Appearance of Yau Oi stop

General information
- Location: Yau Oi Estate; Tuen Mun District; Hong Kong
- System: MTR Light Rail stop
- Owner: KCR Corporation
- Operator: MTR Corporation
- Line: 751
- Platforms: 1 side platform
- Tracks: 1
- Connections: Bus, minibus

Construction
- Structure type: At-grade
- Accessible: yes

Other information
- Station code: YAO (English code); 275 (Digital code)
- Fare zone: 2

History
- Opened: 18 September 1988; 37 years ago

Services
Preceding stop	MTR Light Rail	Following stop
Terminus	751	On Ting towards Tin Yat
Location
- Location within MTR

Yau Oi (Chinese: 友愛) is an MTR Light Rail stop located at ground level on Yau Oi Road near Yau Oi Car Park, Yau Oi Estate in Tuen Mun District, Hong Kong. It began service on 18 September 1988 and belongs to Zone 2. The stop only has one platform, which is used for the terminus of route 751.
