= Sam Shing stop =

Light rail terminus in Tuen Mun, Hong Kong

Coordinates: 22°22′58″N 113°58′36″E

Sam Shing 三聖
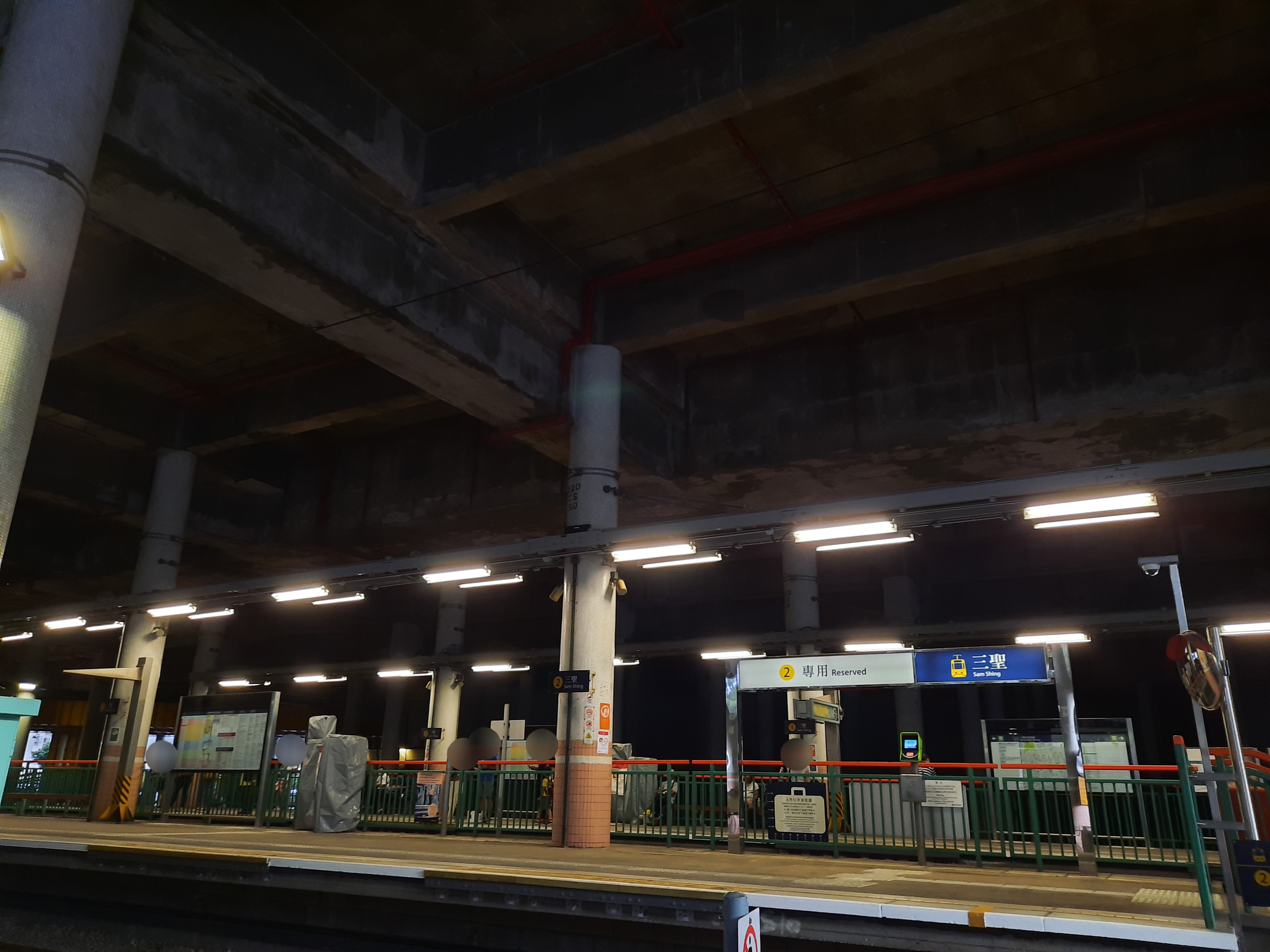
- Sam Shing stop platform

General information
- Location: Sam Shing Estate and Hanford Garden; Tuen Mun District; Hong Kong
- System: MTR Light Rail stop
- Owner: KCR Corporation
- Operator: MTR Corporation
- Line: 505
- Platforms: 3 (3 side platforms)
- Tracks: 3
- Connections: Bus, minibus

Construction
- Structure type: At-grade
- Accessible: yes

Other information
- Station code: SAS (English code); 920 (Digital code)
- Fare zone: 1

History
- Opened: 2 February 1992; 34 years ago

Services
| Preceding stop | MTR Light Rail | Following stop |
|---|---|---|
| Terminus | 505 | Siu Lun towards Siu Hong |
Location
- Location within MTR

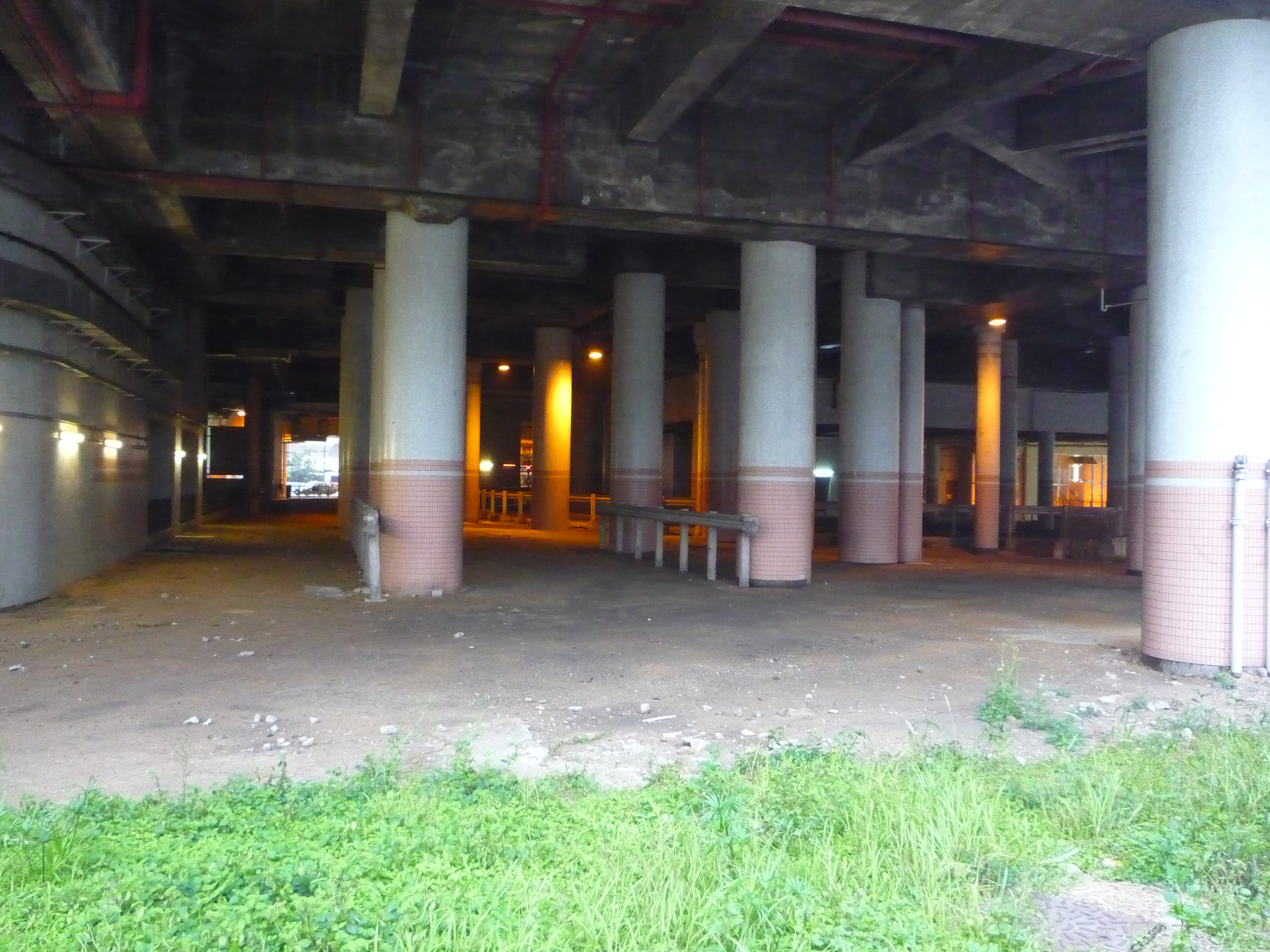
Reserved area for branch lines in March 2010

Sam Shing (Chinese: 三聖) is an MTR Light Rail terminus located on the ground near Hoi Wing Road, inside Hanford Garden and next to Sam Shing Estate in Tuen Mun District, Hong Kong. It began service on 2 February 1992 and belongs to Zone 1. It serves Sam Shing Estate and Hanford Garden.

There are three platforms in the terminus. Platform 1 is the terminus of route 505. Platform 2 is reserved for emergency use. Platform 3 is for alighting.

The stop was named Sam Shing Terminus (三聖總站) before 13 June 2010.

== Reserved area ==
Besides the current Route 505, there were other two branch lines planned for the terminus, departing to Chi Lok Fa Yuen and Hong Kong Gold Coast in Tuen Mun respectively. But the plan was later left out by British Hong Kong Government due to insufficient population in the two places in the 1990s. As a result, there are still some vacant areas left in the terminus after the terminus completed construction.
