= Siu Hong stop =

Light rail stop in Hong Kong

Siu Hong 兆康
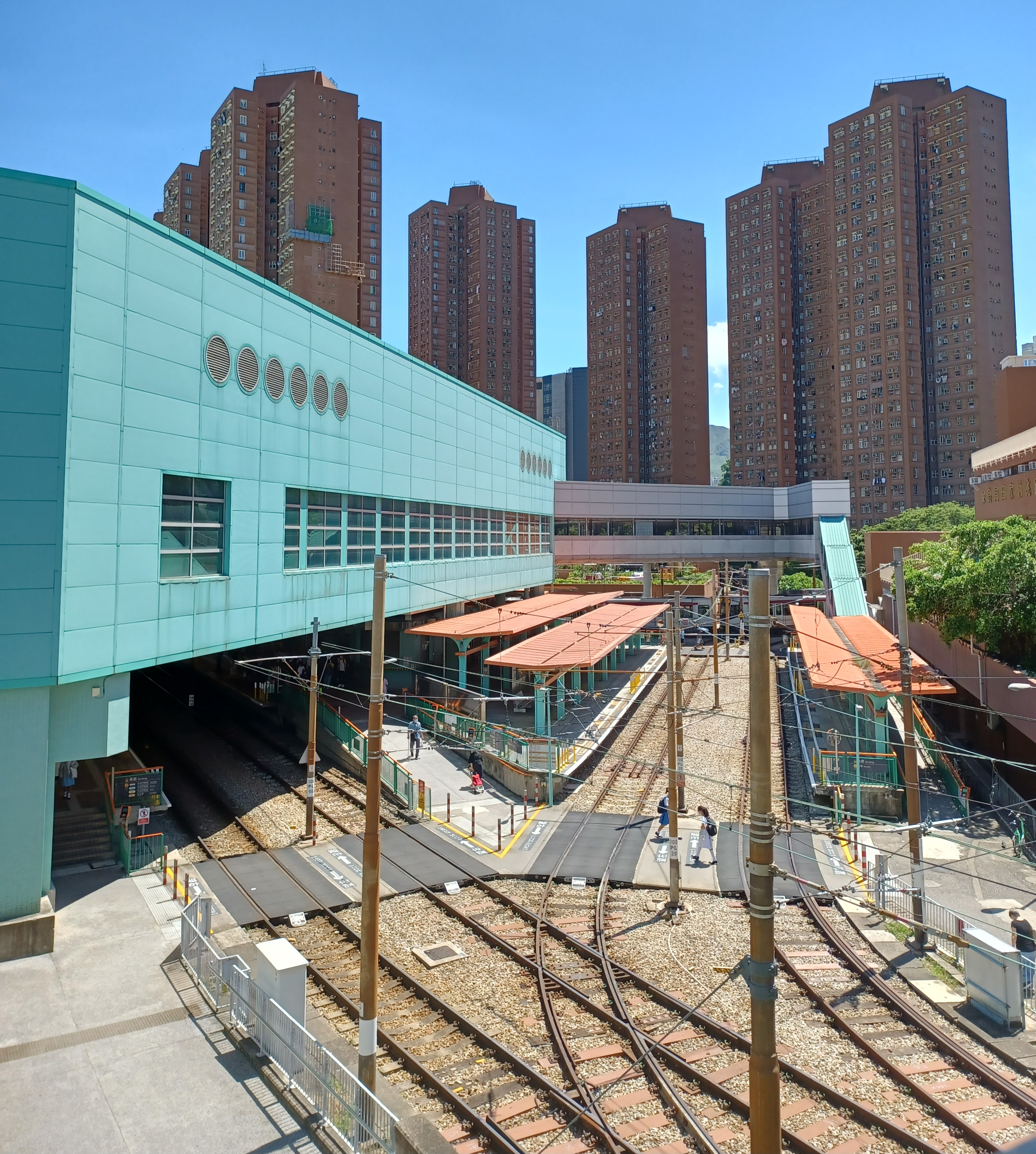
- Platforms 1-4, Siu Hong stop

General information
- Location: Siu Hong Court, Tuen Mun; Tuen Mun District, Hong Kong
- Coordinates: 22°24′43″N 113°58′42″E
- System: MTR Light Rail stop
- Owner: KCR Corporation
- Operator: MTR Corporation
- Line: 505 610 614 614P 615 615P 751
- Platforms: 6 side platforms
- Tracks: 6
- Connections: Tuen Ma line ( Siu Hong); Bus, minibus

Construction
- Structure type: At-grade
- Accessible: yes

Other information
- Station code: SHL (English code); 100 (Digital code)
- Fare zone: 3

History
- Opened: 18 September 1988; 37 years ago

Services
Preceding stop	MTR Light Rail	Following stop
Kei Lun One-way operation	505	Terminus
Ching Chung towards Sam Shing	505	Terminus
Tuen Mun Hospital towards Tuen Mun Ferry Pier	610	Lam Tei towards Yuen Long
Fung Tei towards Tuen Mun Ferry Pier	614	Lam Tei towards Yuen Long
Fung Tei towards Tuen Mun Ferry Pier	614P	Terminus
Ching Chung towards Tuen Mun Ferry Pier	615	Lam Tei towards Yuen Long
Kei Lun towards Tuen Mun Ferry Pier	615P	Terminus
Tuen Mun Hospital towards Yau Oi	751	Lam Tei towards Tin Yat
Preceding station	MTR	Following station
Tuen Mun Terminus	Tuen Ma line	Tin Shui Wai towards Wu Kai Sha
Location
- Location within MTR

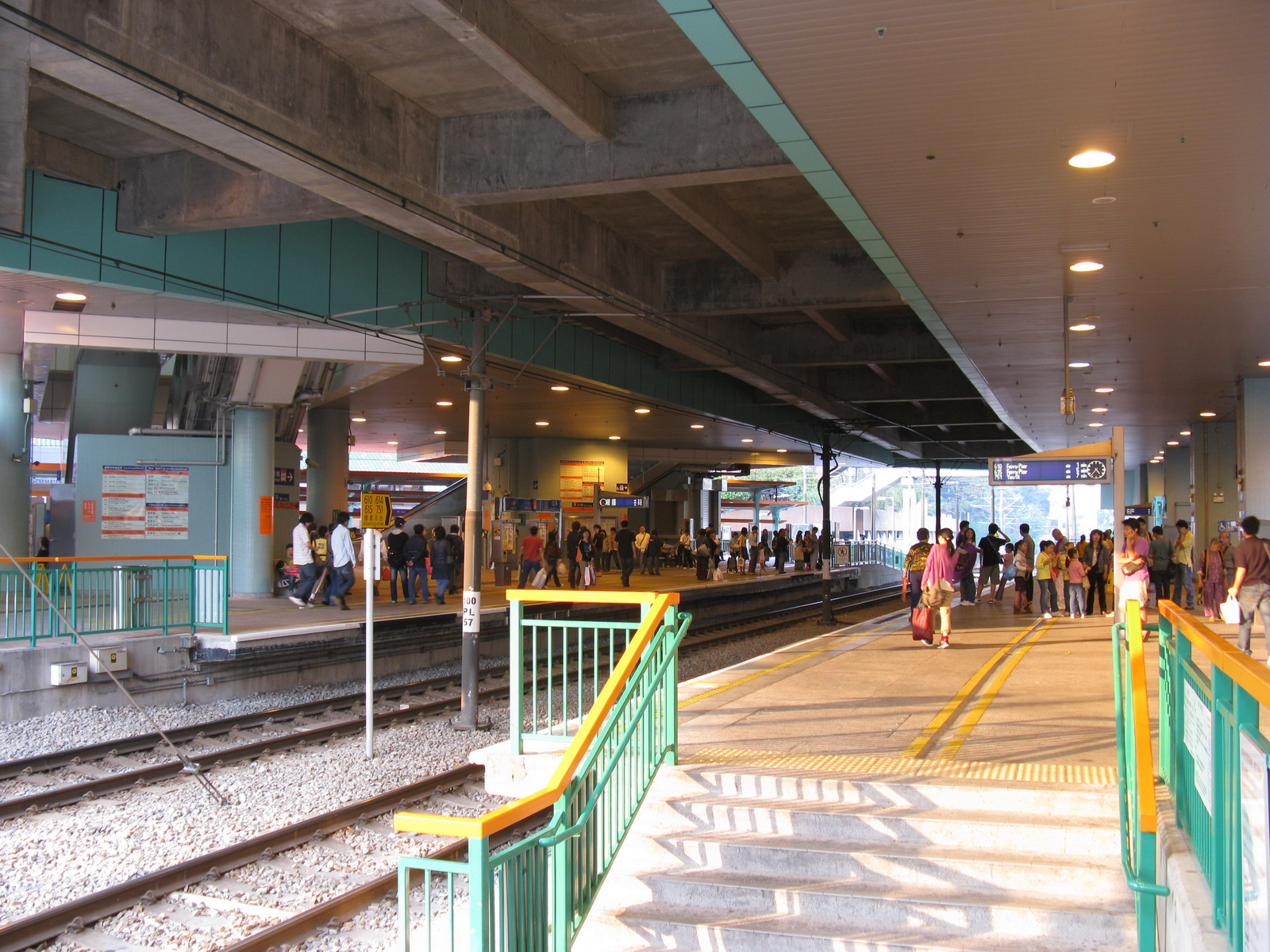
Light Rail Siu Hong Stop platform 1 and 2

Siu Hong (Chinese: 兆康) is an MTR Light Rail stop in Hong Kong. It is located in the west of Tuen Mun River and east of Siu Hong Court. Siu Hong stop belongs to zone 3 for single-ride tickets. The code of this stop is 100.

== Station layout ==
C Tuen Ma line Concourse	Tuen Ma line Concourse	Tuen Ma line Siu Hong station, Light Rail Customer Service Centre
P Platform (Ground)	Platform 6	615P towards Tuen Mun Ferry Pier	Platform 3	Reserved
P Platform (Ground)	Platform 5	505 towards Sam Shing; 614P towards Tuen Mun Ferry Pier	Platform 4	Reserved
P Platform (Ground)	Platform 1	610 614 615 towards Yuen Long; 751 towards Tin Yat
P Platform (Ground)	Platform 2	610 614 615 towards Tuen Mun Ferry Pier; 751 towards Yau Oi
