= Tuen Mun Ferry Pier stop =

Light rail stop in Tuen Mun, Hong Kong

Coordinates: 22°22′23″N 113°57′59″E

Tuen Mun Ferry Pier 屯門碼頭
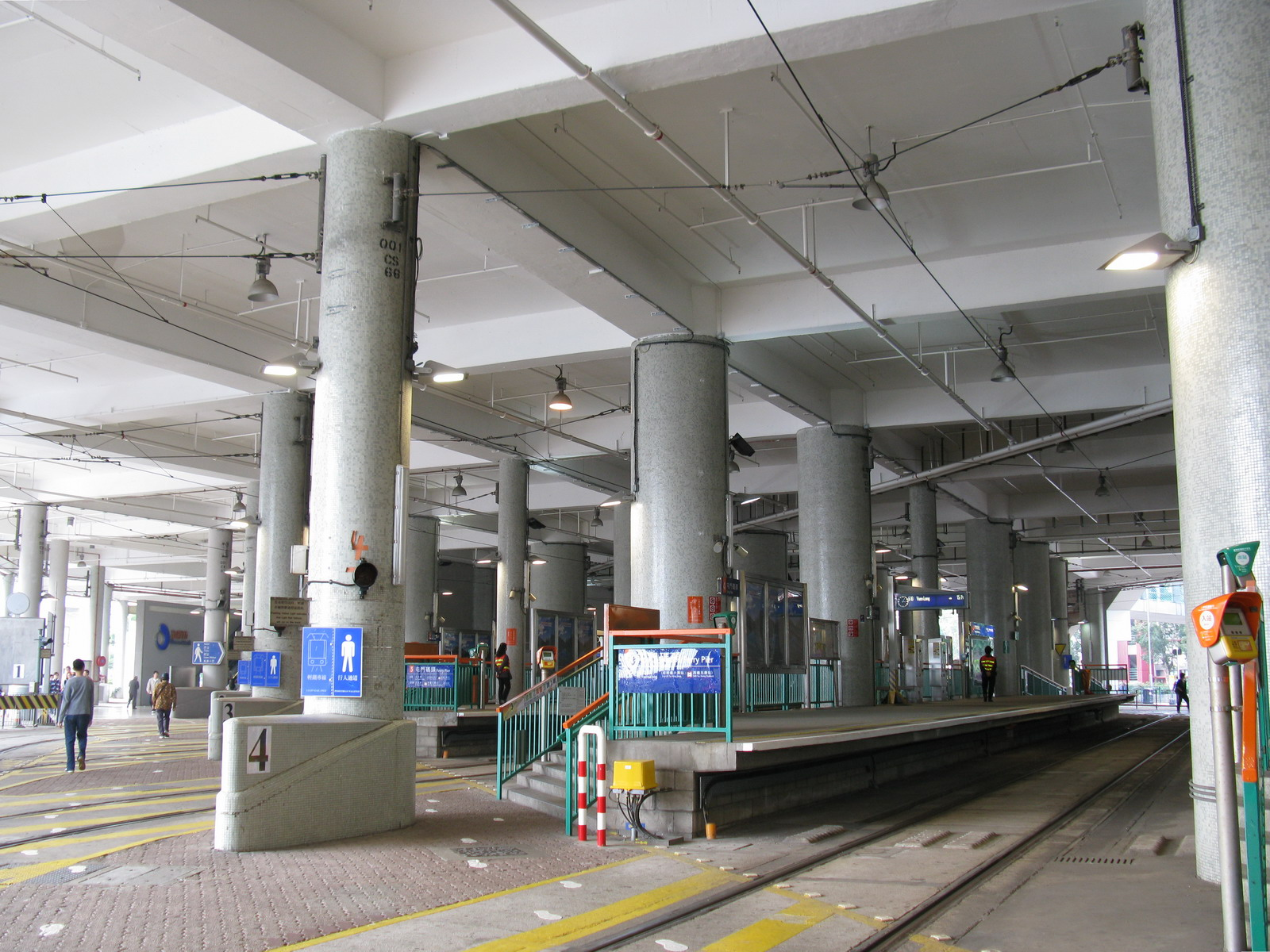
- Platform 4

General information
- Location: Tuen Mun Ferry Pier; Tuen Mun District; Hong Kong
- System: MTR Light Rail stop
- Owner: KCR Corporation
- Operator: MTR Corporation
- Line: 507 610 614 614P 615 615P
- Platforms: 7 side platforms
- Tracks: 7
- Connections: Bus, minibus

Construction
- Structure type: At-grade
- Accessible: yes

Other information
- Station code: FEP (English code); 001 (Digital code)
- Fare zone: 1

History
- Opened: 18 September 1988; 37 years ago

Services
Preceding stop	MTR Light Rail	Following stop
Terminus	507	Siu Hei towards Tin King
Terminus	610	Melody Garden towards Yuen Long
Terminus	614	Siu Hei towards Yuen Long
Terminus	614P	Siu Hei towards Siu Hong
Terminus	615	Melody Garden towards Yuen Long
Terminus	615P	Melody Garden towards Siu Hong
Location
- Location within MTR

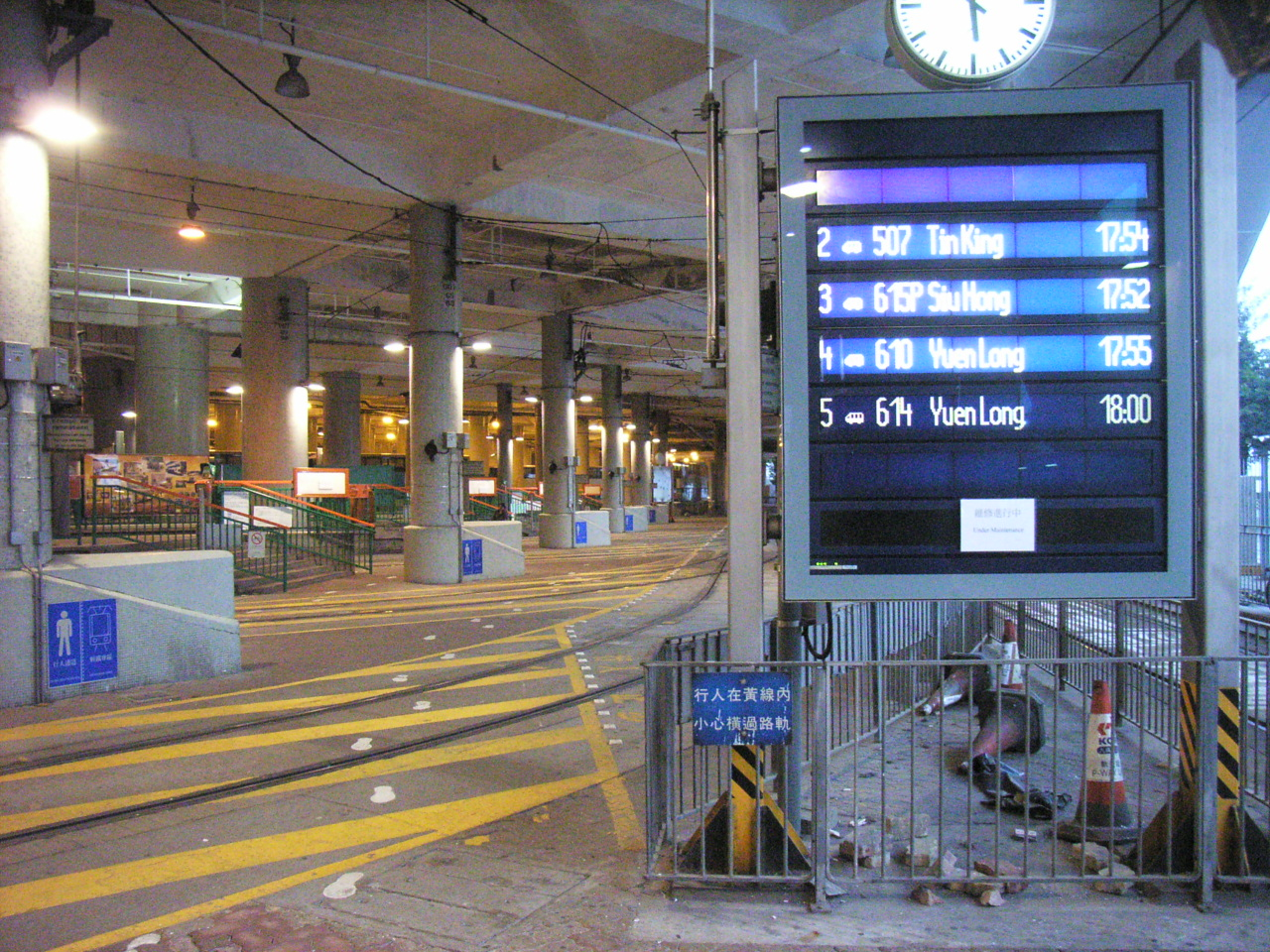
Ferry Pier Terminus

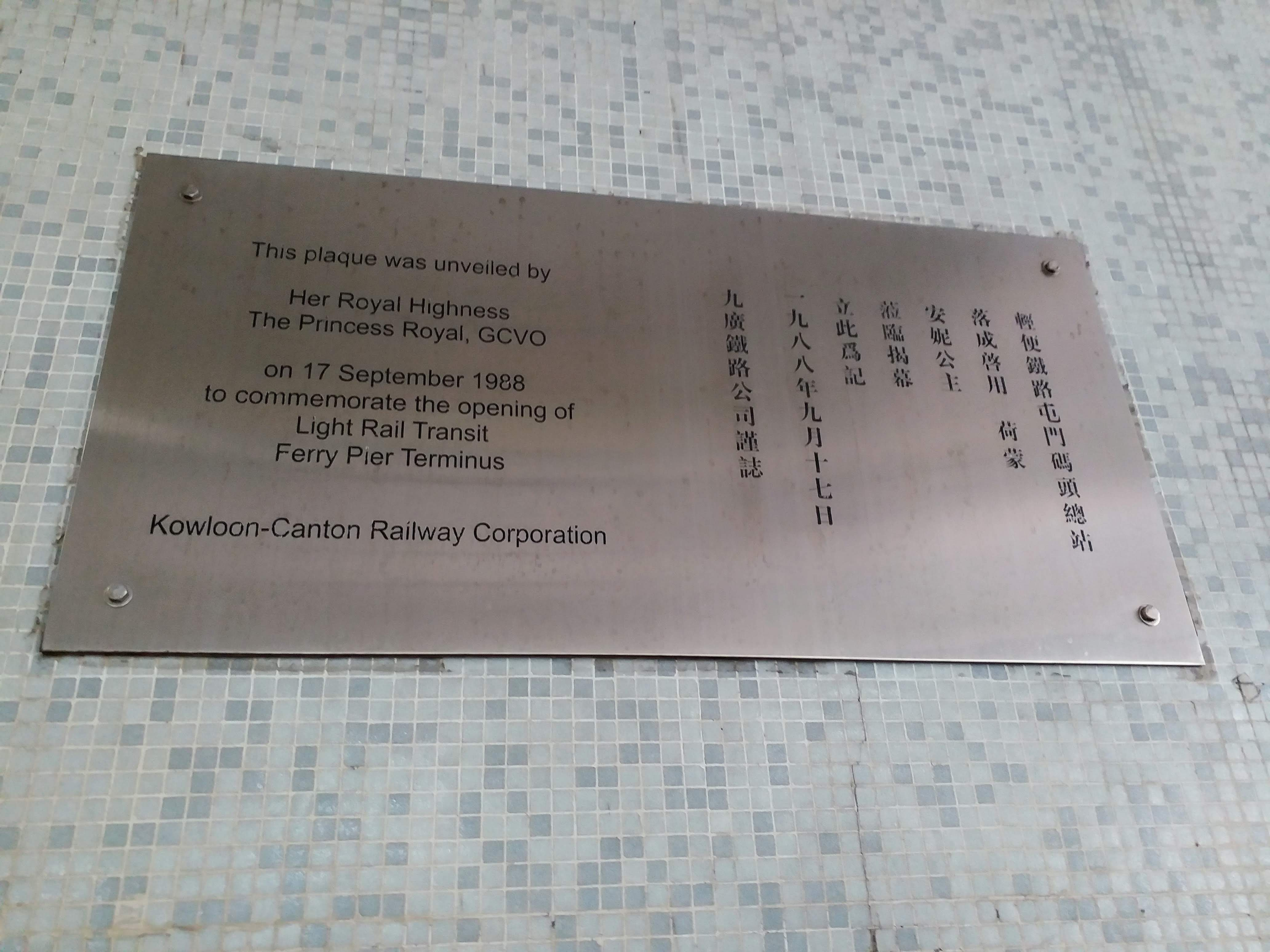
Opening day plaque unveiled by Princess Anne in 1988

Tuen Mun Ferry Pier (Chinese: 屯門碼頭) is an MTR Light Rail terminus located at ground level inside Pierhead Garden, Tuen Mun Ferry Pier, Wu Chui Road in Tuen Mun, Tuen Mun District, Hong Kong. It began service on 18 September 1988, and belongs to Zone 1. It serves Tuen Mun Ferry Pier and nearby residential buildings. This station will link to the Tuen Mun South station in 2030, when the Tuen Ma Line extends to this station.

The terminus has seven platforms. Platform 2 is used for route 507, platform 3 for routes 615 and 615P, platform 4 for route 610, and platform 5 for routes 614 and 614P. Platforms 1 and 6 are reserved for backup purposes, while Platform 7 is for alighting only. It also has a customer service centre and a bus terminus.

The stop has six platforms for terminating lines, the most in the system.

== History ==
The stop was opened to the public on 18 September 1988, as Ferry Pier (屯門碼頭). On the previous day, the Light Rail Transit system was declared open by Anne, Princess Royal, at this stop; the commemorative plaque she unveiled still remains intact. The stop was renamed Ferry Pier Terminus (屯門碼頭總站) later.

On 13 June 2010, the terminus was renamed Tuen Mun Ferry Pier (屯門碼頭).

== Hazard to pedestrians ==
Because of the planning of this Light Rail stop, the pathways for pedestrians are very close to the rails; it is dangerous for a pedestrian to cross from one platform to another when a train is approaching. However, some pedestrian crossing signal lights that light up when trains approach were added.
