= Kin On stop =

Light rail stop in Hong Kong

Coordinates: 22°23′43″N 113°58′09″E

Kin On 建安
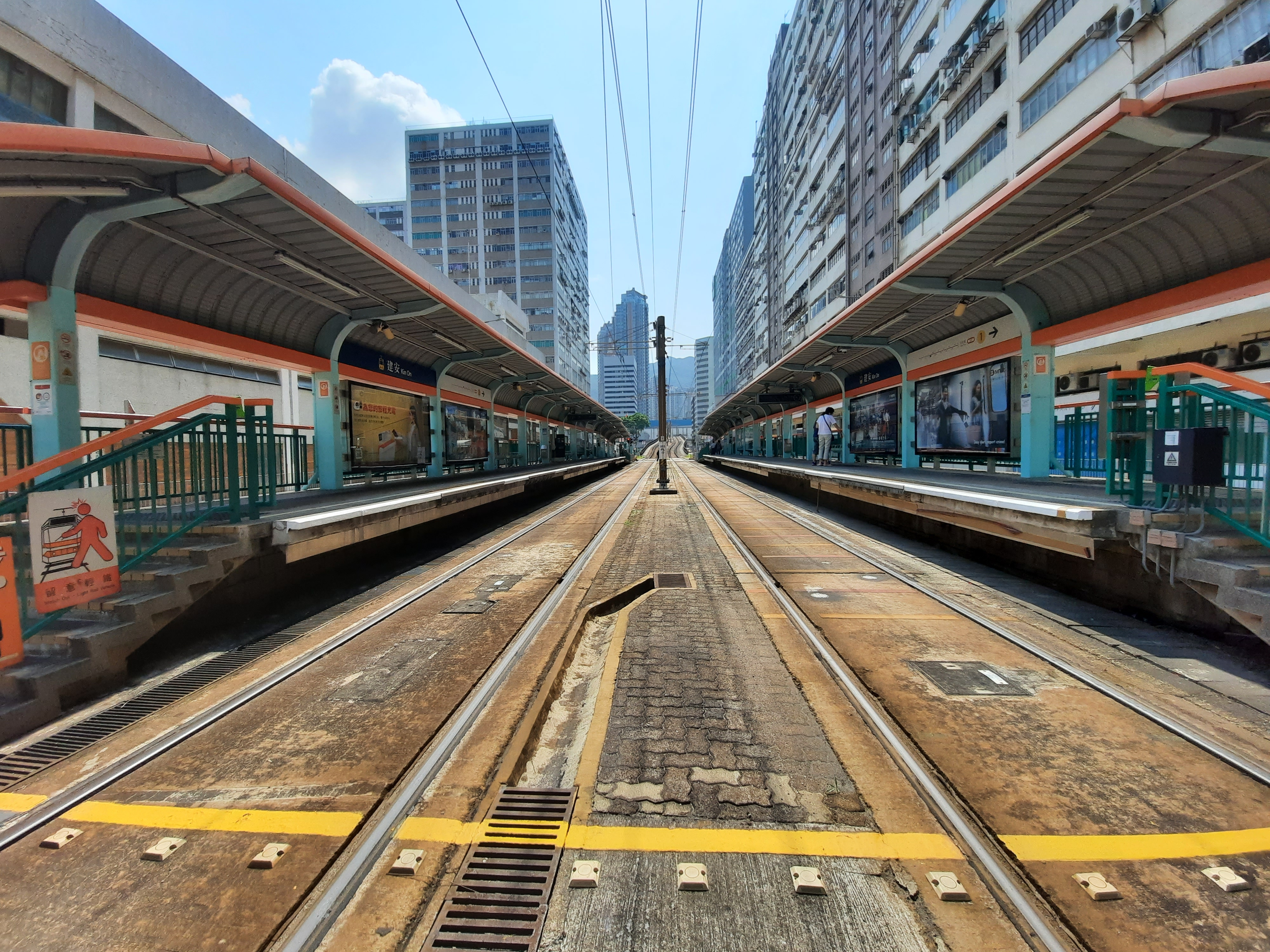
- Kin On stop's Platform

General information
- Location: Pui To Road; Tuen Mun District; Hong Kong
- System: MTR Light Rail stop
- Owner: KCR Corporation
- Operator: MTR Corporation
- Line: 505
- Platforms: 2 side platforms
- Tracks: 2
- Connections: Bus, minibus

Construction
- Structure type: At-grade
- Accessible: yes

Other information
- Station code: KIO (English code); 060 (Digital code)
- Fare zone: 2

History
- Opened: 18 September 1988; 37 years ago

Services
Preceding stop	MTR Light Rail	Following stop
Tuen Mun towards Sam Shing	505	Shan King (South) towards Siu Hong
Tuen Mun towards Sam Shing	505	Ming Kum One-way operation
Location
- Location within MTR

Kin On (Chinese: 建安) is an at-grade MTR Light Rail stop located at the junction of Pui To Road and Kin On Street in Tuen Mun District. It began service on 18 September 1988 and belongs to Zone 2. It serves nearby industrial buildings.
