= Light Rail (MTR) =

Hong Kong New Territories rail service

Light Rail 輕鐵

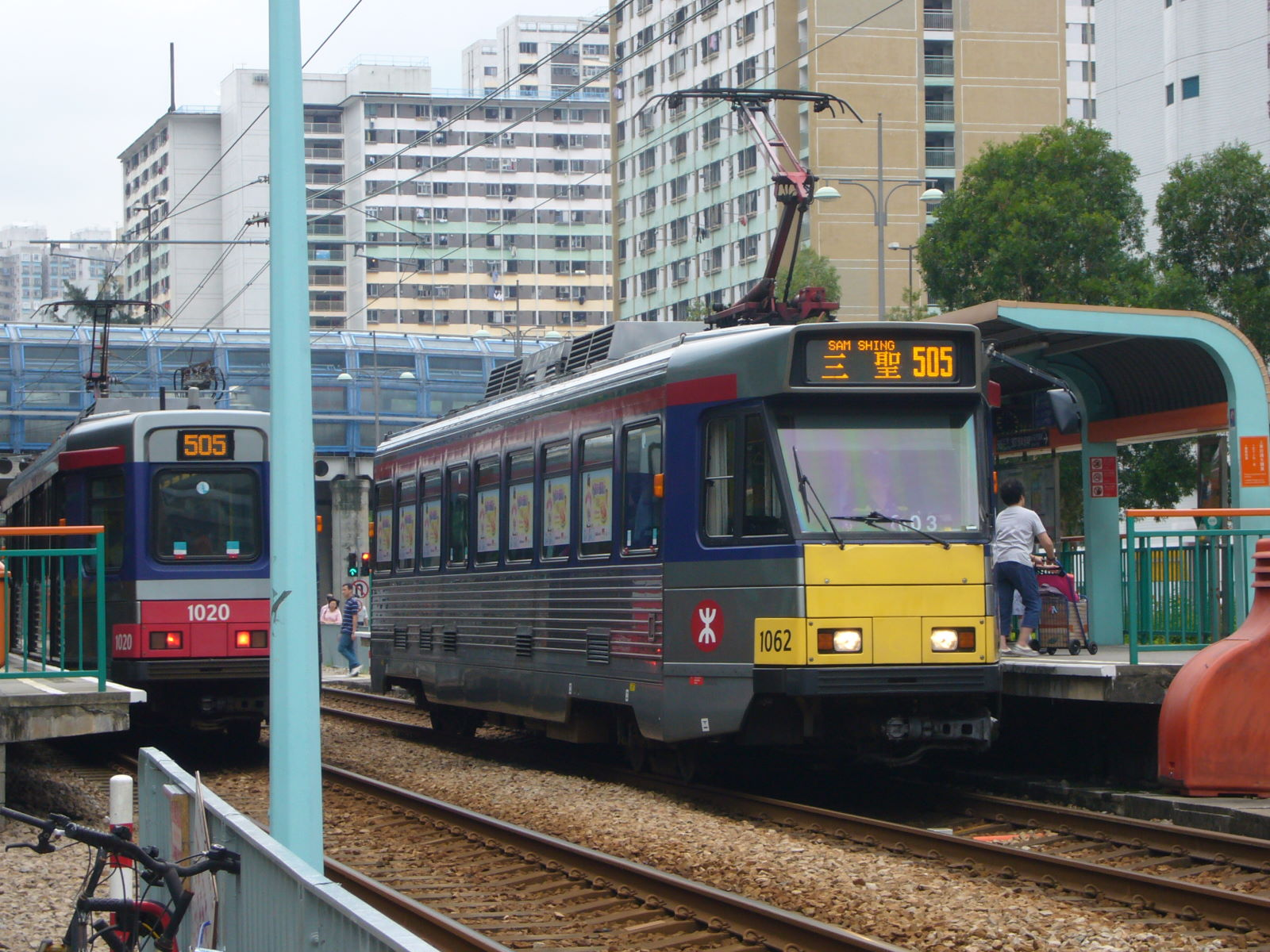
- Two MTR Phase I LRVs at Siu Lun stop

Overview
- Other name(s): Light Rail Transit (LRT), North-West Railway
- Status: Operational
- Owner: KCR Corporation
- Locale: Tuen Mun District; Yuen Long District
- Connecting lines: Tuen Ma line
- Former connections: West Rail line
- Stations: 68
- Color on map: Goldenrod

Service
- Type: Light rail
- System: MTR
- Services: see #Routes
- Operator: MTR Corporation
- Depot: Tuen Mun
- Rolling stock: 1 or 2-car high-floor light rail vehicles

History
- Opened: 18 September 1988; 37 years ago
- Last extension: 2002

Technical
- Line length: 36.2 km (22.5 mi)
- Character: Elevated; At-grade
- Track gauge: 1,435 mm (4 ft 8 1/2 in) standard gauge
- Electrification: 750 V DC (Overhead line)

Light Rail
- Traditional Chinese: 輕鐵
- Simplified Chinese: 轻铁
- Cantonese Yale: Hīngtit
- Literal meaning: Light rail
Transcriptions
Standard Mandarin
- Hanyu Pinyin: Qīngtiě
Hakka
- Romanization: Khiâng-thiet
Yue: Cantonese
- Yale Romanization: Hīngtit
- Jyutping: Hing1tit3
- IPA: [héːŋ.tʰīːt̚]
Southern Min
- Hokkien POJ: Kheng-thih

Light Rail network map

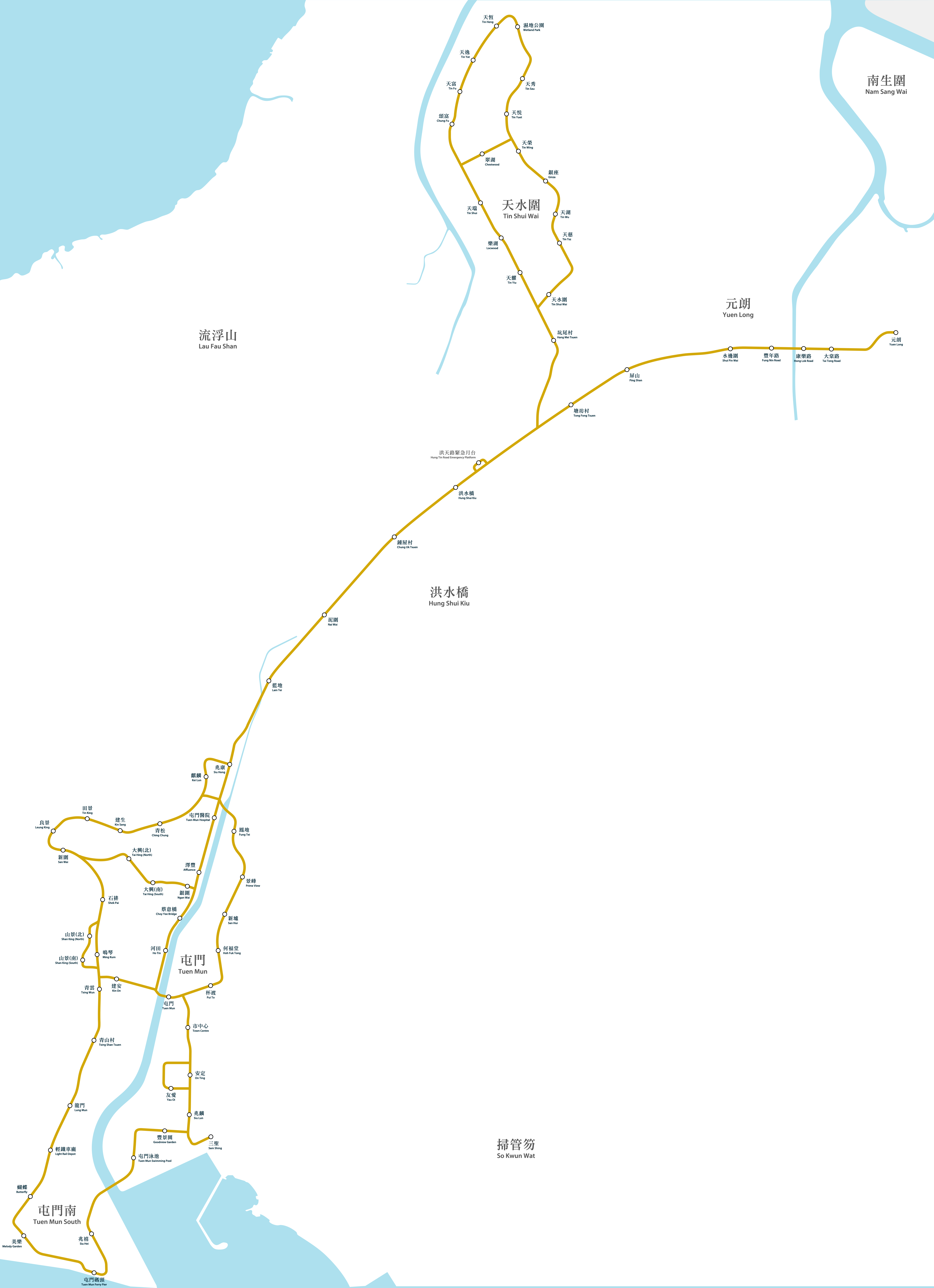
Geographically accurate map of the Light Rail network

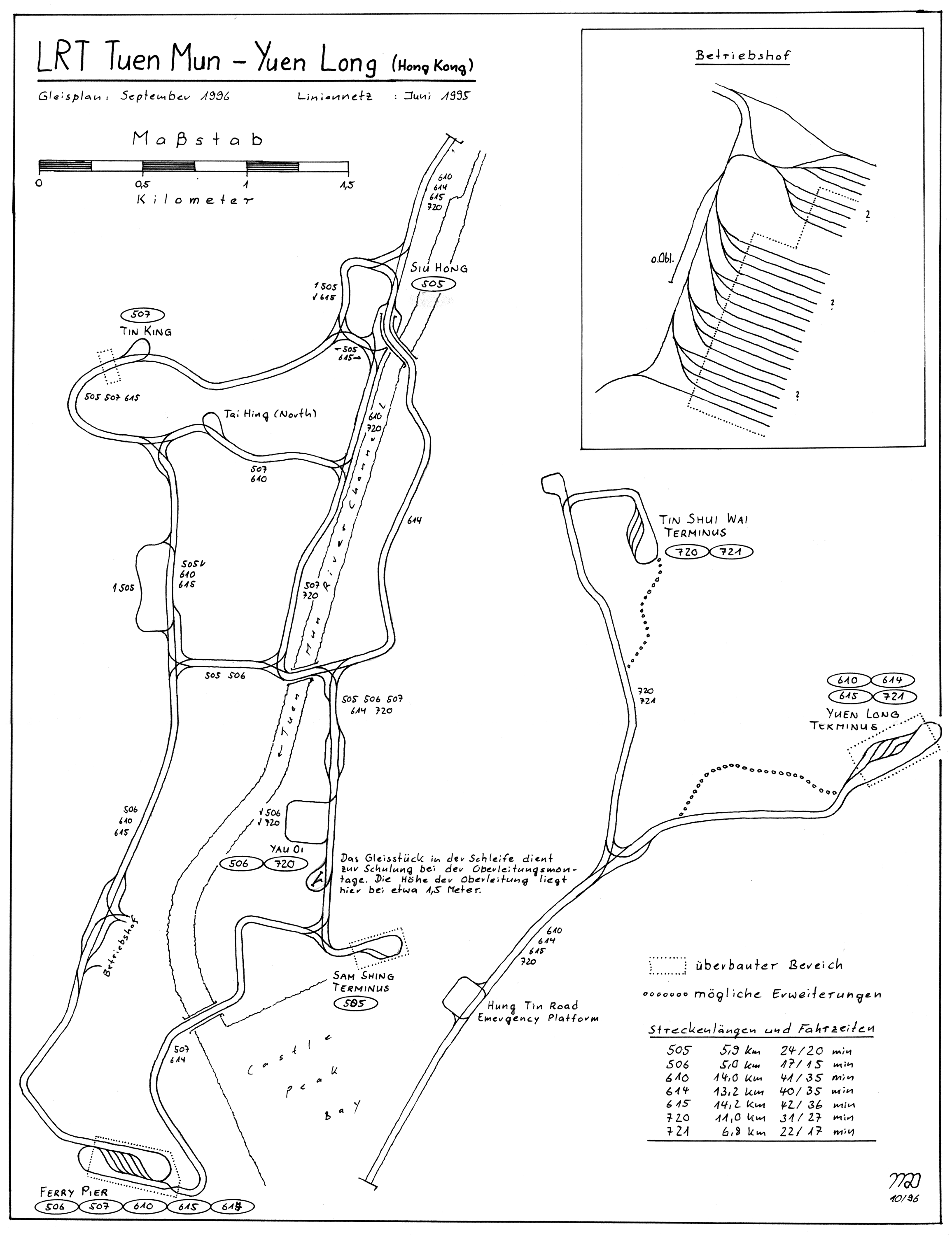
Track layout diagram of the network in 1996

The Light Rail, also known as the Light Rail Transit (LRT) (and formerly known as KCR Light Rail until 2 December 2007), officially the North-West Railway, is a light rail system in Hong Kong, serving the northwestern New Territories, within Tuen Mun District and Yuen Long District. The system operates over 1,435 mm (4 ft 8 1/2 in) standard gauge track, using 750 V DC overhead power supply. Operated by the MTR, it was once one of four systems comprising the KCR network in Hong Kong, before the MTR–KCR merger in 2007. It has a daily ridership of about 483,000 people. The network is coloured goldenrod on the MTR map.

== History ==
=== Planning and commencement ===
When Tuen Mun was developed in the 1970s, the Hong Kong government set aside space for the laying of rail tracks. There was uncertainty however as to which company would be chosen to build the railway. In 1982, Hong Kong Tramways showed interest in building the system and running double-decker trams on it, before abandoning the project after negotiations over land premiums for related property development failed. The government sought another builder. The Mass Transit Railway Corporation (MTRC) was "heavily indebted" at the time, and so Secretary for Transport Alan Scott invited the Kowloon-Canton Railway Corporation (KCRC) to consider the project instead. The KCRC announced they would build the system in 1984 to a budget of $1.5 billion, after investigating ways to improve commercial viability. After some research, construction commenced on 14 July 1985.

By that time, Kowloon Motor Bus (KMB) had developed its own network in Tuen Mun and Yuen Long, and there were about 10 routes serving within the districts internally, most of them profitable. However, the government introduced the concept of the "Light Rail Service Area" in both districts, within which the LRT would monopolise all public transport services, forcing the KMB to withdraw all internal bus services in favour of the Light Rail. It also forced the KMB to impose boarding and alighting restrictions for external routes. It was decided that services between town centres and settlements would be provided solely by the Light Rail, while feeder buses operated by the KCRC would connect remote sites to the network, replacing KMB's equivalent services where applicable.

The system was completed and fully operational in September 1988. The first section was opened to the public on 14 September 1988, with free rides between Tuen Mun and Yuen Long; normal, all-day service began four days later, on 18 September. The system consisted of two large and three small loops serving most of the public housing estates in northern Tuen Mun. Three branches: one to On Ting Estate in the southeast, one to the Tuen Mun Ferry Pier in the southwest and another northern branch all the way into the town of Yuen Long along Castle Peak Road. It was then known as Light Rail Transit or LRT and is also called as the North-west Railway according to the Kowloon–Canton Railway Corporation Ordinance and Mass Transit Railway (North-west Railway) Bylaw.

The transit system is the first and the only one in Hong Kong to adopt a zonal fare system. The feeder buses have fares independent of these zones, but provide discounts when passengers interchange between these buses and LRT. Seventy single-deck LRVs were manufactured in Melbourne and Brisbane, Australia by Comeng, to be shipped to Hong Kong for the seven LRT routes in the system. Three of the routes were to Yuen Long and the others were confined to Tuen Mun.

=== Extensions ===
The system's first extension came for the southern and eastern parts of Tuen Mun. The eastern extension branches off the main line south of Siu Hong stop and crosses the river that runs through Tuen Mun immediately with a flyover. The line then runs along Castle Peak Road to a road north of the town centre, where it climbs to another flyover and rejoins the main route. The northern end of this extension is still the only non-triangular junction in the entire system.

The southern extension mainly consists of a route linking On Ting and Ferry Pier, on the newly reclaimed land near the river mouth of Tuen Mun River, known as "Mouse Island" by locals. A short spur was also built from the extension to another terminus at Sam Shing Estate, located near Castle Peak Bay. Three LRT routes were diverted (route 505 was extended to Sam Shing) and one feeder bus route (route 559) discontinued as a result of these changes.

Tin Shui Wai was originally an area with numerous fish ponds, but was developed as a residential new town in the early 1990s. With the increase of internal commuter traffic demand, an LRT spur was built north of Hung Shui Kiu stop that opened in 1993, with four stops serving the initial housing areas of the town. The area was further developed in the next few years and the line was extended by two stops: Chestwood and Tin Wing stop in 1995 (Tin Shui Wai Terminus was renamed Tin Wing after the opening of West Rail line). Two LRT routes were established, route 720 (now 751) to Yau Oi and route 721 Before Changed to (761) Then changed to (761P) to Yuen Long.

=== West Rail ===
The system remained essentially unchanged until the completion of the West Rail (now Tuen Ma line) in December 2003. Many changes were made, mainly around the new railway stations. The KCRC designed most railway stations in the LRT area to interchange with the new West Rail line. The idea was to encourage passengers to use the West Rail line instead of the Light Rail for longer journeys, thereby freeing up LRT vehicles for passengers making shorter journeys. For this purpose, an interchange discount system was launched with the introduction of the West Rail line system, meaning that passengers would pay no more (and in some cases less) to travel on West Rail line instead of the LRT for the main part of their journey. Although this most recent extension is the largest ever, no new vehicles were purchased. And although rearrangements were made, some infrequent and unreliable services resulted, causing passengers to blame the lack of vehicles and poor arrangement of new services. The KCRC has since modified the inside of some vehicles to allow more standing room for passengers during peak hours. They also made several route alterations to arrange them better.

In addition to the reconfiguration of light rail tracks around the new West Rail stations, the system was extended to reach northern Tin Shui Wai to serve ongoing development there.

== Rolling stock ==
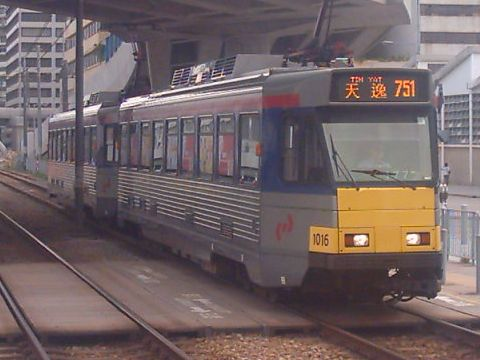
Phase I LRV in KCR livery

The system's vehicles consist of four different types of LRVs. All LRVs are uni-directional with driving cab on one side only, 20.2 metres (66 ft 3 in) long, and have 3 sliding doors fitted on the left side (when facing the running direction from inside). This means that island platforms (except the triangular platform at Siu Hong stop) cannot be used at all in the LRT system and the termini have to feature loops for LRVs to reverse in direction.

Phase I LRVs were built by Comeng and put in service in 1988. They are numbered 1001–1070 and accommodate 43 seated passengers and 161 standees. The driver's cab interior and exterior design was conceived for KCRC by Design Triangle in 1986. Phase III LRVs were built by UGL and entered service in 1997. They are numbered 1091–1110 and accommodate 26 seated and 212 standees. Phase IV LRVs were manufactured by UGL and CSR and entered service in December 2009. They are numbered 1111–1132 accommodate 37 seated and 248 standees. Phase I LRVs have two wheelchair positions while Phase III, IV and V LRVs have three positions. The newest Phase V LRVs were manufactured by CRRC Nanjing Puzhen and entered service on 17 November 2020. They are numbered 1133-1162/1211-1220; 1133-1162 are cab cars while 1211-1220 are cabless trailer. 30 of these replaced the unrefurbished Phase II LRVs, while the other 10 were dedicated for expansion.

Traction systems for Phase I LRVs consist of GTO chopper controls and DC traction motors provided by AEG, while those for the Phase III, IV and V LRVs consist of 2-level IGBT–VVVF inverters and asynchronous 3-phase AC traction motors provided by Mitsubishi Electric. The maximum speed for all LRVs is 80 km/h (50 mph), although they rarely reach that speed because of the many grade crossings between stops and the close proximity between stops in Tuen Mun, Yuen Long and Tin Shui Wai.

From the exterior it is difficult to differentiate between the first three types of LRVs. There are, however, distinct features that one can use to tell them apart; Phase III LRVs still retain their original green electronic displays while all other LRVs have new orange electronic displays. Phase I cars also have a wide window at the rear that can be opened in case of an emergency, while Phase II cars have a door at the back. The interior of the Phase III cars has a greenish look and the doors are also green. The Phase IV LRVs have a completely different appearance in contrast to the older phase. It has a white exterior livery with olive green and purple line on the side. The shape of the front of the LRV is more streamlined than the older phases. The door opening and closing mechanism was similar to the ones from the K-class cars used in the Tseung Kwan O line and Tung Chung line. The Phase IV has 3 surveillance cameras in each vehicle. Seat belts and wheelchair positions were also available in the Phase IV. On older-generation LRVs there is a perch seat but the Phase IVs do not maintain this feature. The refurbished Phase I LRVs have rounded rectangular windows while Phase IV LRVs have square ones.

The Kawasaki Heavy Industries Phase II LRVs were not refurbished; upon the commissioning of CRRC Nanjing Puzhen's 30 Phase V LRVs, the Phase II LRVs were phased out. Withdrawals began on 28 August 2022, with the first two Phase II LRVs (1079 and 1204) removed from Tuen Mun Depot and sent to the scrapyard. On 26 February 2023, the last of the Phase II LRVs were officially withdrawn from service following a retirement ceremony. One of the retired cars now survives at the Ying Wa College and Primary School, transformed into a classroom. Meanwhile, the Phase III LRVs are expected to be rebuilt and repainted with a scheme similar to the Phase IV LRVs.

In June 2024, the MTR Corporation borrowed a hydrogen fuel cell-powered tram car from the Foshan Gaoming Tram Line 1 in China for a three-month testing program. The collected data were analyzed to support research on the potential application of hydrogen-powered transport in Hong Kong. The trials formed part of the government’s initiatives outlined in the 2024 Policy Address under The Strategy of Hydrogen Development. After completion of the testing, the vehicle was sent back to China in December 2024.

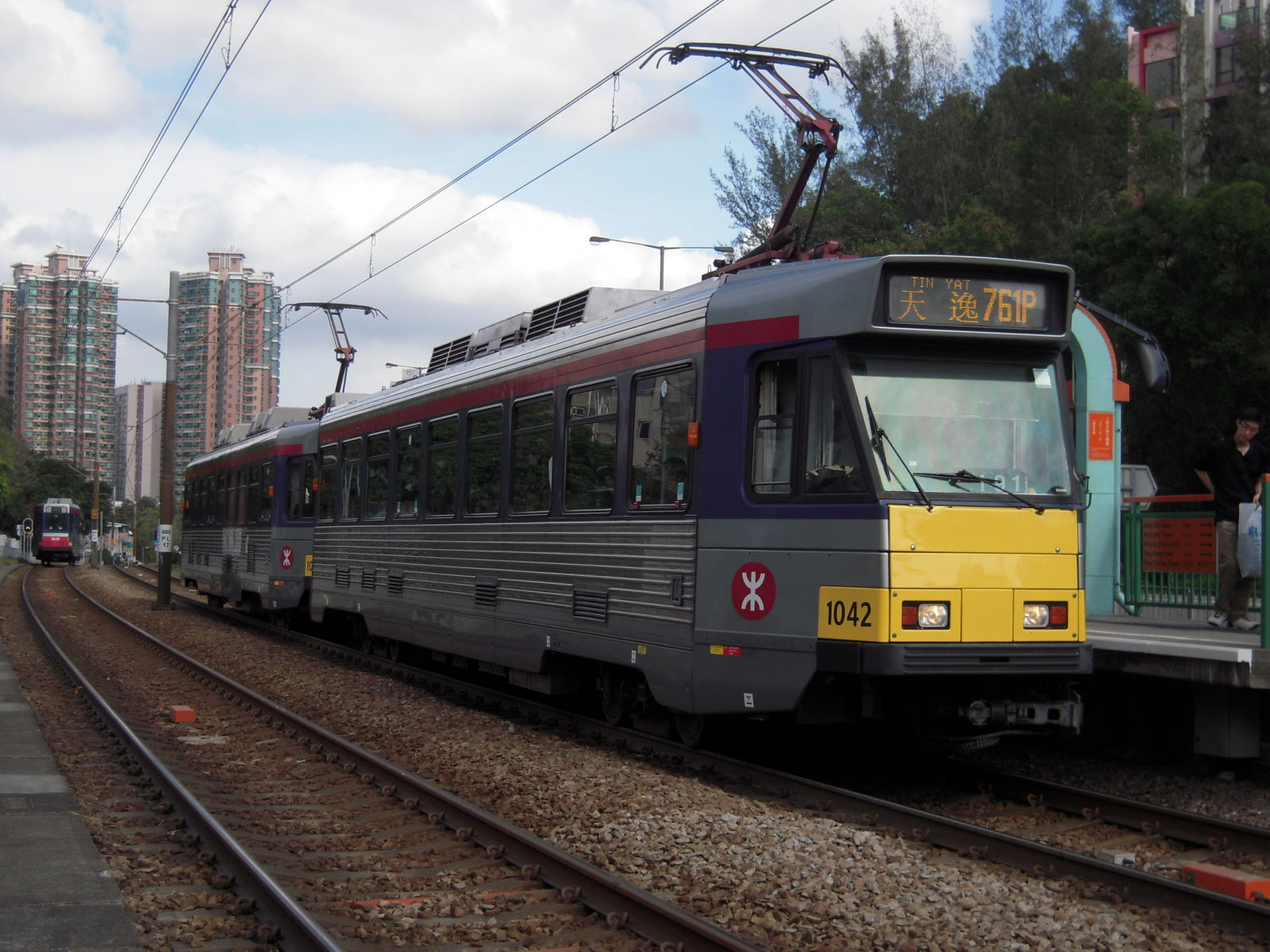
Comeng Phase I LRV car 1042

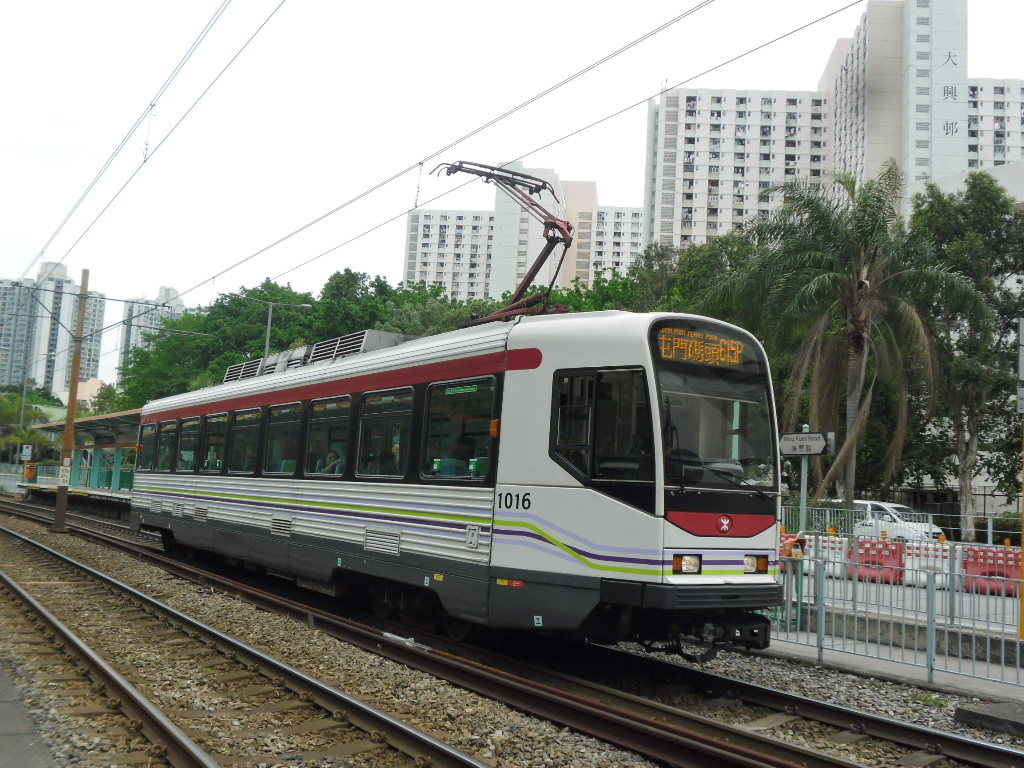
Comeng Phase I LRV refurbished car 1016

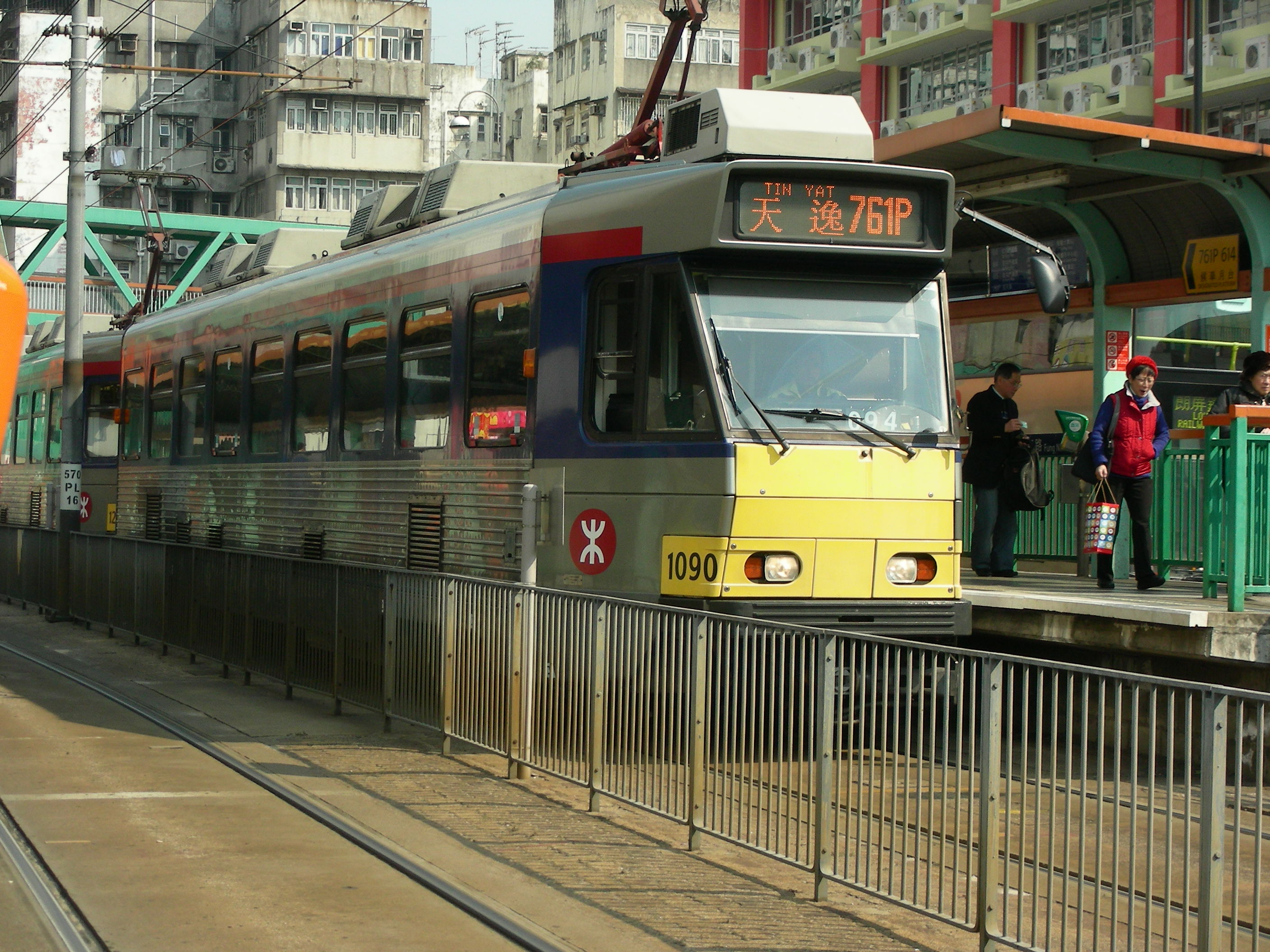
Kawasaki Phase II LRV cab car 1090 and trailer 1205

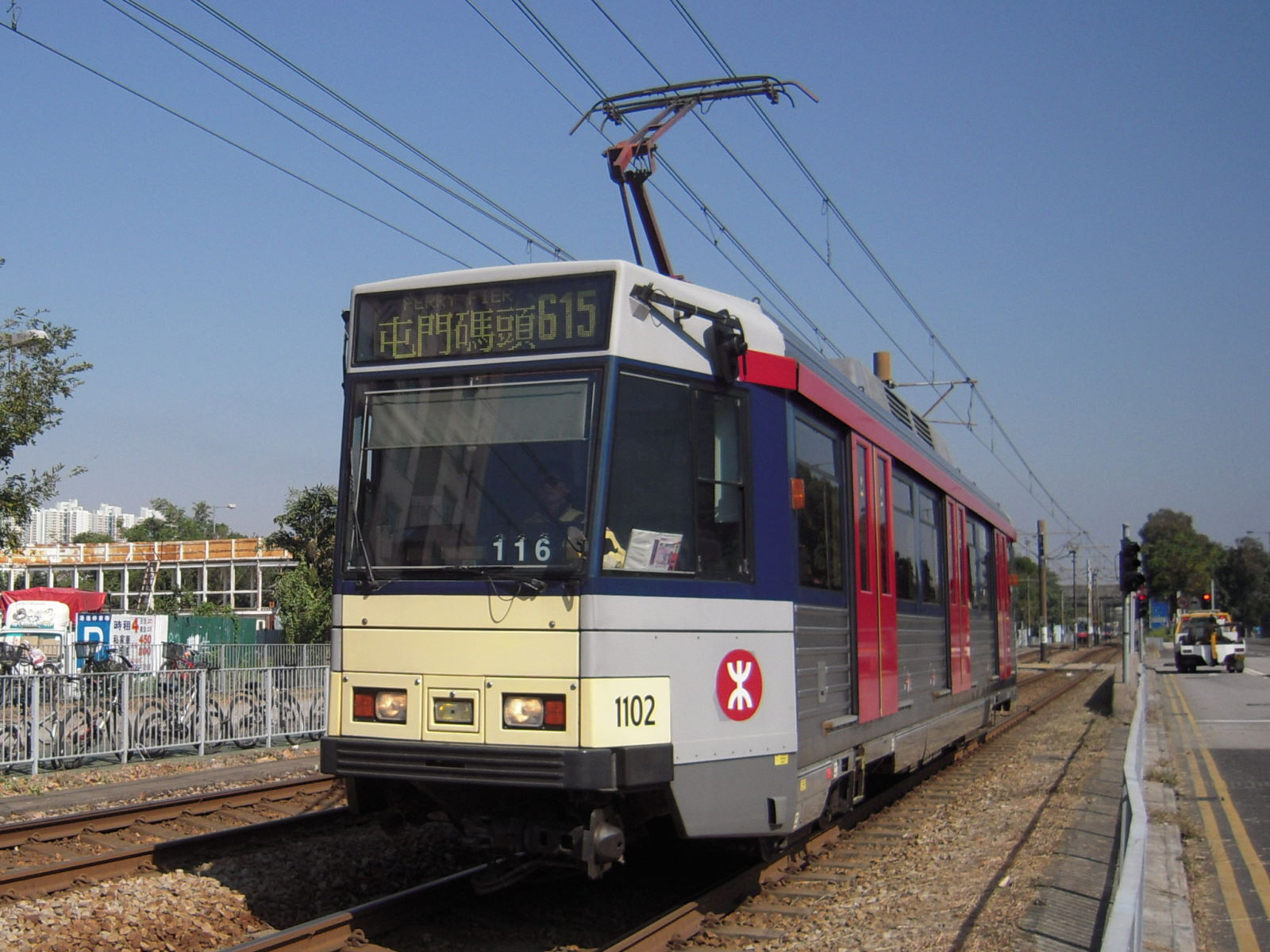
A. Goninan Phase III LRV car 1102

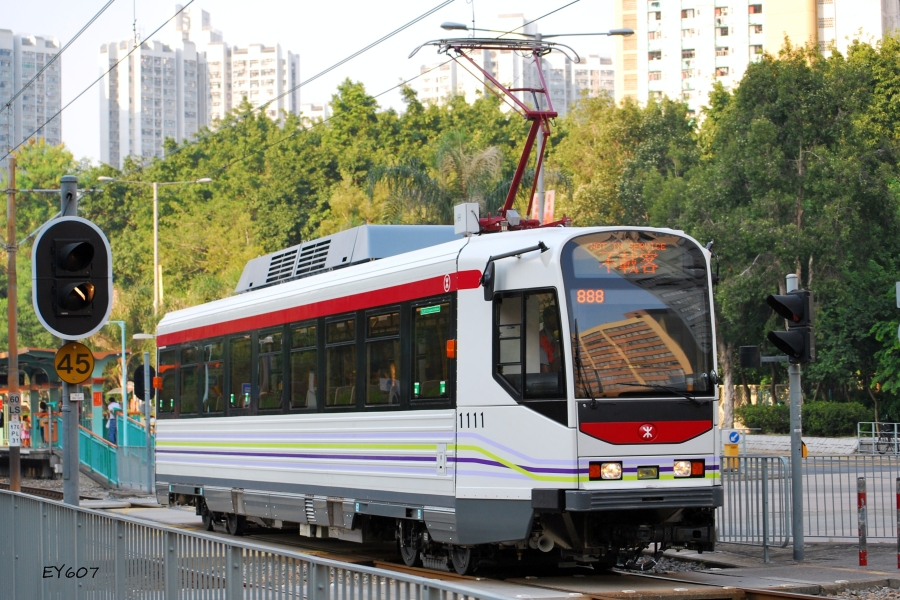
A. Goninan (UGL)/CSR Phase IV Light Rail vehicle 1111

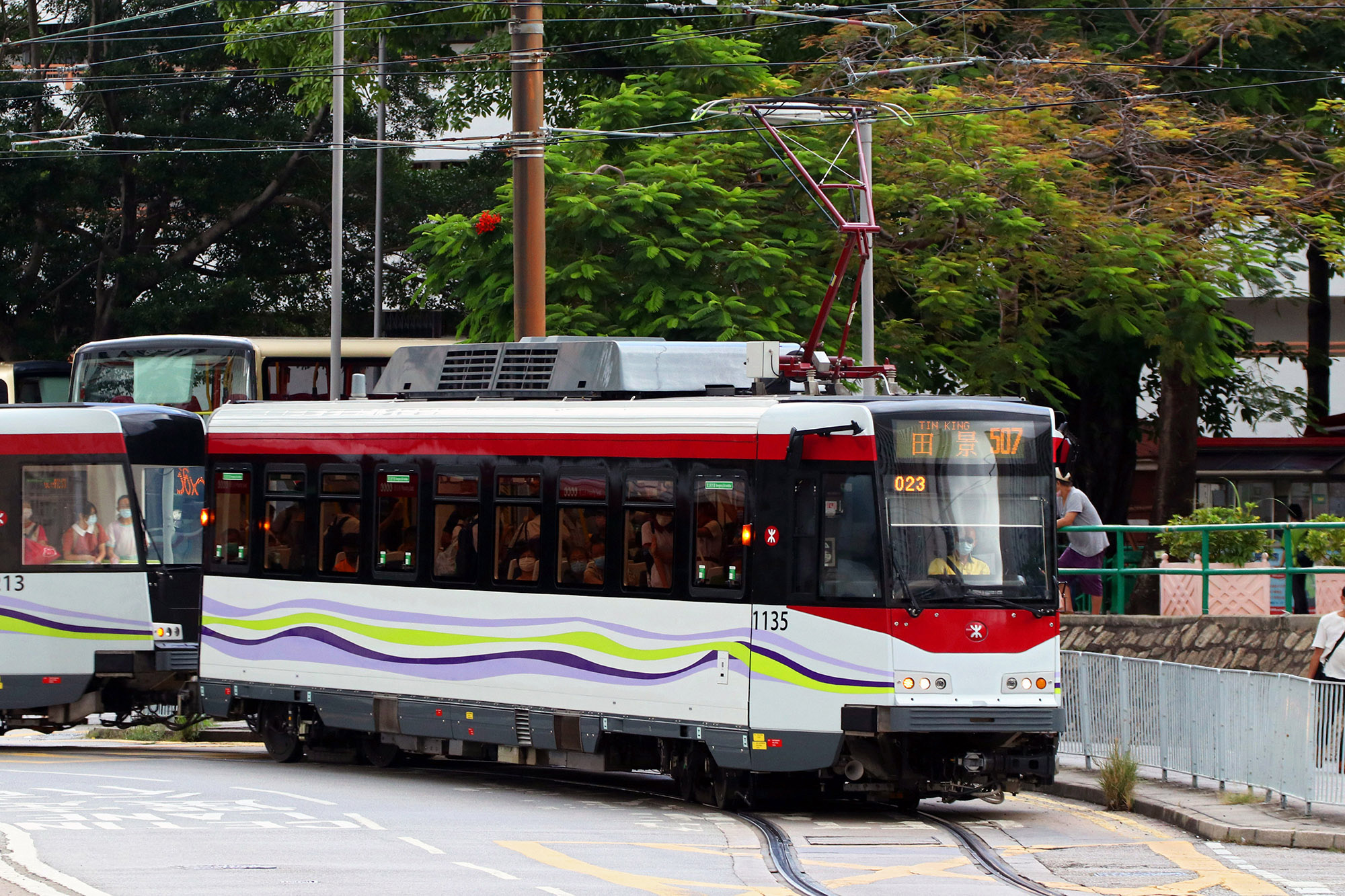
CRRC Nanjing Puzhen Phase V LRV cab car 1135 and a trailer behind

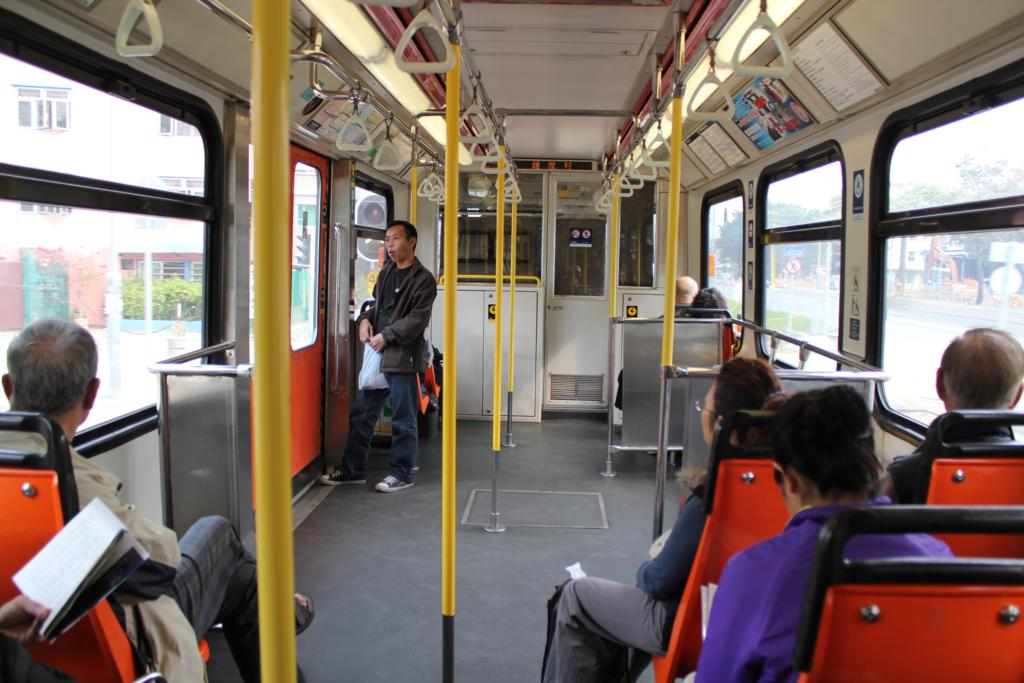
Interior of an unrefurbished MTR Light Rail vehicle (presumably a Phase II)

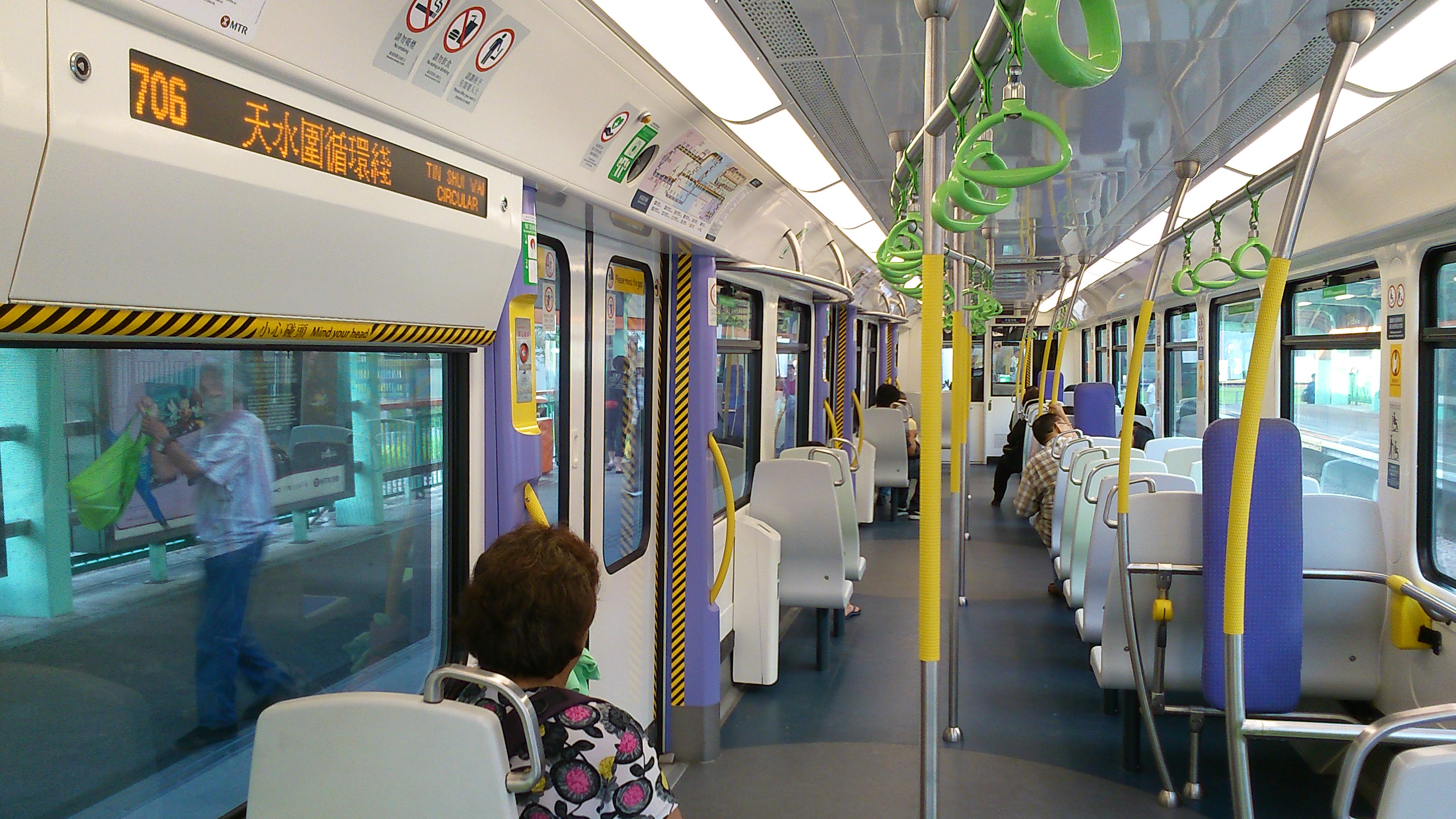
Interior of a refurbished MTR Light Rail vehicle

== Stops and routes ==
=== Stops ===
Fare zone	Name	Routes	District	Connections	Opened	Code
1	Lung Mun (Note: Formerly Hung Lau, San Shek Wan Stop)	610, 615, 615P	Tuen Mun	MTR Bus Route 506, K52A, K52S	18 September 1988	030
1	Light Rail Depot (Note: Formerly Pak Kok, LRT Depot Stop)	610, 615, 615P	Tuen Mun	MTR Bus Route 506, K52A, K52S	18 September 1988	020
1	Butterfly	610, 615, 615P	Tuen Mun	MTR Bus Route 506, K52, K52A, K52S	18 September 1988	015
1	Melody Garden	610, 615, 615P	Tuen Mun	MTR Bus Route 506, K52, K52A, K52S	18 September 1988	010
1	Tuen Mun Ferry Pier (Note: Formerly Ferry Pier, Ferry Pier Terminus Stop)	507, 610, 614, 614P, 615, 615P	Tuen Mun	MTR Bus Route 506, K52	18 September 1988	001
1	Siu Hei	507, 614, 614P	Tuen Mun		17 November 1991	240
1	Hoi Wong Road (Note: Formerly Tuen Mun Swimming Pool Stop)	507, 614, 614P	Tuen Mun		17 November 1991	250
1	Goodview Garden	507, 614, 614P	Tuen Mun		17 November 1991	260
1	Siu Lun	505, 507, 614, 614P	Tuen Mun	MTR Bus Route 506	17 November 1991	265
1	Sam Shing	505	Tuen Mun	MTR Bus Route 506, K51, K51A, K52, K53, K58	2 February 1992	920
2	Tsing Shan Tsuen	610, 615, 615P	Tuen Mun	MTR Bus Route 506, K52A, K52S	18 September 1988	040
2	Tsing Wun (Note: Formerly Lung Mun, Technical Institute Stop)	610, 615, 615P	Tuen Mun	MTR Bus Route 506, K52A, K52S	18 September 1988	050
2	Ming Kum	505 (to Sam Shing), 610, 615, 615P	Tuen Mun	MTR Bus Route K58	18 September 1988	200
2	Shek Pai	505, 610, 615, 615P	Tuen Mun	MTR Bus Route K58	18 September 1988	170
2	Ngan Wai	507, 610	Tuen Mun		18 September 1988	230
2	Tai Hing (South)	507, 610	Tuen Mun		18 September 1988	220
2	Tai Hing (North)	507, 610	Tuen Mun	MTR Bus Route K58	18 September 1988	212
2	Affluence (Note: Formerly Ho King Stop)	610, 751	Tuen Mun		18 September 1988	080
2	Choy Yee Bridge	507, 751	Tuen Mun		18 September 1988	075
2	Ho Tin	507, 751	Tuen Mun	Tuen Ma line Tuen Mun station	18 September 1988	070
2	Tuen Mun^{[295]}	505, 507, 751	Tuen Mun	Tuen Ma line Tuen Mun station, MTR Bus Route 506, K51, K51A, K52, 52A, K52S, K53, K58	23 September 1988	295
2	Yau Oi	751	Tuen Mun		18 September 1988	275
2	On Ting	505, 507, 614, 614P, 751 (to Tin Yat)	Tuen Mun	MTR Bus Route 506	18 September 1988	270
2	Town Centre	505, 507, 614, 614P, 751	Tuen Mun	MTR Bus Route 506, K51, K51A, K52, K53, K54, K58	18 September 1988	280
2	Kin On	505	Tuen Mun	MTR Bus Route 506, K52A, K52S, K58	18 September 1988	060
2	Shan King (South)	505 (to Siu Hong)	Tuen Mun		24 September 1988	190
2	Shan King (North)	505 (to Siu Hong)	Tuen Mun		24 September 1988	180
2	Pui To	614, 614P	Tuen Mun		2 February 1992	300
2	Hoh Fuk Tong	614, 614P	Tuen Mun		2 February 1992	310
2	San Hui	614, 614P	Tuen Mun		2 February 1992	320
2	Prime View	614, 614P	Tuen Mun	MTR Bus Route K51, K51A	2 February 1992	330
3	Kei Lun	505 (to Siu Hong), 615P	Tuen Mun	MTR Bus Route K58	18 September 1988	110
3	Ching Chung	505, 615, 615P	Tuen Mun	MTR Bus Route K58	24 September 1988	120
3	Kin Sang	505, 615, 615P	Tuen Mun	MTR Bus Route K58	24 September 1988	130
3	Tin King	505, 507, 615, 615P	Tuen Mun	MTR Bus Route K58	24 September 1988	140
3	Leung King	505, 507, 615, 615P	Tuen Mun	MTR Bus Route K58	24 September 1988	150
3	San Wai	505, 507, 615, 615P	Tuen Mun	MTR Bus Route K58	24 September 1988	160
3	Tuen Mun Hospital	610, 751	Tuen Mun		18 September 1988	090
3	Fung Tei	614, 614P	Tuen Mun	MTR Bus Route K51, K51A	2 February 1992	340
3	Siu Hong	505, 610, 614, 614P, 615, 615P, 751	Tuen Mun	Tuen Ma line Siu Hong station, MTR Bus Route K51, K51A, K54, K58	18 September 1988	100
3	Lam Tei	610, 614, 615, 751	Tuen Mun		18 September 1988	350
3	Nai Wai	610, 614, 615, 751	Tuen Mun		18 September 1988	360
3	Chung Uk Tsuen	610, 614, 615, 751	Tuen Mun		18 September 1988	370
4	Hung Shui Kiu	610, 614, 615, 751	Yuen Long	MTR Bus Route K75A, K75P	18 September 1988	380
4	Ping Shan	610, 614, 615, 761P	Yuen Long	MTR Bus Route K65	18 September 1988	400
4	Tong Fong Tsuen	610, 614, 615, 761P	Yuen Long		18 September 1988	390
4	Hang Mei Tsuen	751, 761P	Yuen Long	MTR Bus Route K65, K65A	10 January 1993	425
4	Tin Yiu	705, 706, 761P	Yuen Long	Tuen Ma line Tin Shui Wai station, MTR Bus Route K75A, K75P, K75S	10 January 1993	445
4	Locwood	705, 706, 761P	Yuen Long	MTR Bus Route K75P	10 January 1993	448
4	Tin Shui	705, 706, 761P	Yuen Long	MTR Bus Route K74, K75P	10 January 1993	460
4	Tin Shui Wai	705, 706, 751	Yuen Long	Tuen Ma line Tin Shui Wai station, MTR Bus Route K65, K65A, K75A, K75S, K76, K76S	7 December 2003	430
4	Tin Wu	705, 706, 751	Yuen Long		7 December 2003	450
4	Tin Tsz	705, 706, 751	Yuen Long	MTR Bus Route K73, K74	7 December 2003	435
4	Ginza	705, 706, 751	Yuen Long	MTR Bus Route K73	7 December 2003	455
4	Tin Wing (Note: Formerly Tin Shui Wai Terminus)	705, 706, 751	Yuen Long	MTR Bus Route K74	26 March 1995	500
4	Chestwood	751	Yuen Long		26 March 1995	490
5A	Chung Fu	705, 706, 751, 761P	Yuen Long	MTR Bus Route K74, K76, K76S	7 December 2003	468
5A	Tin Fu	705, 706, 751, 761P	Yuen Long	MTR Bus Route K76, K76S	7 December 2003	480
5A	Tin Yat	705, 706, 751, 761P	Yuen Long	MTR Bus Route K73, K76, K76S	7 December 2003	550
5A	Tin Heng	705, 706	Yuen Long	MTR Bus Route K73, K76, K76S	7 December 2003	540
5A	Wetland Park	705, 706	Yuen Long	MTR Bus Route K76S	7 December 2003	530
5A	Tin Sau	705, 706	Yuen Long	MTR Bus Route K73	7 December 2003	520
5A	Tin Yuet	705, 706	Yuen Long	MTR Bus Route K74	7 December 2003	510
5	Shui Pin Wai	610, 614, 615, 761P	Yuen Long	MTR Bus Route K65	18 September 1988	560
5	Fung Nin Road (Note: Formerly Town Hall Stop)	610, 614, 615, 761P	Yuen Long	MTR Bus Route K65, K66, K66A, K68, K73, K74	18 September 1988	570
5	Hong Lok Road	610, 614, 615, 761P	Yuen Long	MTR Bus Route K65, K74	18 September 1988	580
5	Tai Tong Road	610, 614, 615, 761P	Yuen Long	MTR Bus Route K65, K66, K74	18 September 1988	590
5	Yuen Long	610, 614, 615, 761P	Yuen Long	Tuen Ma line Yuen Long station, MTR Bus Route K65, K74	18 September 1988	600
	Hung Tin Road Emergency Platform	when service fails, a temporary terminal stop for 610, 614, 615, 751, 761P	Yuen Long		18 September 1988	385

=== Routes ===
There are currently eleven normal routes in the Light Rail system.

- Route 505 runs between Siu Hong and Sam Shing via Kin On. The route was created in 1988 and extended from On Ting to Sam Shing in 1992. On 14 July 2002, due to the Light Rail grade separation works on Pui To Road being done as part of the Light Rail's integration with the then-under construction West Rail, route 505 was diverted to operate via Ngan Wai, and service to Shan King (North), Shan King (South) and Kin On was replaced by a temporary bus also numbered 505. The prior service was restored on 30 August 2003, following the completion of the grade separation works.
- Route 507 runs between Tuen Mun Ferry Pier and Tin King via Ngan Wai. It was created on 4 June 1989 and was extended from On Ting to Tuen Mun Ferry Pier in 1991.
- Route 610 runs between Tuen Mun Ferry Pier and Yuen Long via Ngan Wai and Ming Kum. It was created when the light rail first opened on 18 September 1988.
- Route 614 runs between Tuen Mun Ferry Pier and Yuen Long via Pui To. It was created in 1992 and replaced route 611, which ran between Tuen Mun Ferry Pier and Yuen Long via Ho Tin and Kin On from opening in 1988 to 1992.
- Route 615 runs between Tuen Mun Ferry Pier and Yuen Long via Tin King and Lung Mun. It was created in 1993 and is the longest route in the system. It also has highest interval (up to 20 minutes per train) and lowest 2-car train ratios in the entire system as well.
- Routes 614P and 615P were created on 4 April 2004, and operate a circular service between Tuen Mun Ferry Pier and Siu Hong. The routes were created as a result of the Light Rail's transition into becoming a short-distance feeder service for West Rail, and upon their creation the service frequencies of routes 614 and 615 were accordingly halved, such that the overall service levels at stops between Siu Hong and Tuen Mun Ferry Pier remained the same.
- Route 705 runs an anticlockwise service around the Tin Shui Wai area via Tin Yat. The route was created on 22 August 2004 and replaced route 701, which ran a shorter anticlockwise service via Chestwood between 16 December 2003 and 21 August 2004.
- Route 706 runs a clockwise service around the Tin Shui Wai area and serves the same stops as route 705. The route was created on 9 April 2004 to enhance short-distance feeder service in Tin Shui Wai.
- Route 751 runs between Tin Yat and Yau Oi. It was created on 7 December 2003 and replaced route 720, which ran between Tin Wing and Yau Oi from 1994 to 2003. (Route 720 was created in 1994 and replaced route 722, which ran between Tin Wing and Siu Hong from 1993 to 1994, as well as route 612, which ran between Yuen Long and Yau Oi from 1988 to 1994.)
- Route 761P runs between Tin Yat and Yuen Long via Locwood. It was originally a short-distance variant of route 761, but then replaced route 761 when it was permanently discontinued on 8 October 2006. Route 761 ran between Tin Wing and Yuen Long via Wetland Park from 7 December 2003 to 7 October 2006, and was a replacement of route 721, which ran between Tin Wing and Yuen Long via Chestwood from 1993 to 2003. After the discontinuation of route 761, special services of route 761P to Tin Wing continued to operate at 30-minute intervals from 10:00 to 15:00 daily until 23 August 2010.

There are also four routes that run only during peak hours:

- Route 506P runs one way from Tuen Mun Ferry Pier to Siu Hong via Lung Mun, Kin On, and Pui To, with two services on school day mornings. It was created in September 2023 and is a special departure of the still suspended route 506.
- Route 507P operates as a single service extension of the 507, starting from Siu Hong, running to Tin King, and then via the 507 route to Tuen Mun Ferry Pier. It was created in September 2022.
- Route 720 runs one way as a extension of a 506P service, running from Siu Hong to Tin Wing, before turning into 751P to go to Tin Shui Wai. It was created September 2024. Not to be confused with the former route 720 which existed between 1994 and 2003 which ran between Yau Oi and Tin Shui Wai (present-day Tin Wing).
- Route 751P operates as a short-distance variant of route 751 between Tin Yat and Tin Shui Wai via Chestwood. It was created in August 2004.

The present MTR Bus route 506 retains the number of the Light Rail route that it replaced. Light Rail route 506 ran between Tuen Mun Ferry Pier and Yau Oi via Kin On; it was created in 1988 and initially terminated at On Ting, but was extended to Yau Oi in 1992. On 14 July 2002, due to the Light Rail grade separation works on Pui To Road, the route was suspended in its entirety and replaced by bus route 506. The suspension was originally intended to be temporary, but the Light Rail route was never resumed due to a lack of LRVs. Despite that the Phase IV and V LRVs entered service in 2009 and 2021 respectively, requests to resumed this route was not entertained. Eventually, MTR decided to introduce route 506P in 2023, which runs the same route as 506 between Tuen Mun Ferry Pier and Tuen Mun.

== Fares ==
The Light Rail is the only public transport system in Hong Kong to have fare zones and the only one with an honour system, in which there are no ticket gates. These fare zones apply only to passengers purchasing single-ride tickets from ticketing machines at LRT stops. Since the introduction of Octopus cards, however, passengers have a choice of ticketing options. All fares indicated below are for adults, while children and the elderly usually pay the concessionary fare, which is about half the adult fare.

=== Single-ride tickets ===
There are six fare zones – 1, 2, 3, 4, 5 and 5A – for passengers purchasing single-ride tickets in Light Rail stops. Zone 5A was introduced solely for the latest extension in Tin Shui Wai, and both zones 5 and 5A are only connected to Zone 4. Therefore, travelling between zones 5 and 5A is considered as travelling through three zones.

=== Octopus cards ===
Octopus card fares are calculated based on the minimum number of stops travelled (from origin to destination stops), rather than the number of fare zones travelled through. All stops have Octopus entry and exit processors at the entrances to and exits from platforms. Passengers may enter the system after scanning their Octopus card at an orange 'Entry Processor' reader. At this point, the maximum fare is deducted from the card. On completion of a journey, the card previously read by an 'Entry Processor' must be scanned at a dark-green 'Exit Processor', where the maximum fare less the fare incurred is refunded. Failure to do so within the time limit would cause the fare difference to be forfeited. If a person exits the same platform with the same card within 5 minutes, the fare deducted will be fully refunded.

Light-blue 'Enquiry Processors' can also be found on most platforms. Like enquiry processors found in other places, passengers can check the balance on their card, along with the 10 most recent Octopus transactions. If a Personalised Octopus card is used, the number of Light Rail credits accumulated is also shown.

Passengers using Personalised Octopus cards are able to participate in the Light Rail Bonus Scheme. A card on which fares totalling HK$30 (adults) or HK$15 (children/seniors) or more are paid over six consecutive days gets an automatic credit of HK$3 (adults) or HK$1.5 (children/seniors).

Passengers using Octopus cards that are registered with the MTR Club are automatically enrolled into the MTR Club Bonus Scheme. Members can earn Bonus Points by riding on the MTR, Airport Express, Light Rail and MTR Bus with their registered Octopus card during the promotion period. Members can then redeem these points for exclusive rewards. Passengers can visit the MTR website for the information of the gift during that particular promotion period.

== Incidents ==
- In July 1994, Comeng Phase I light rail car 1013 and a lorry collided, killing the captain. The involved car was scrapped after the accident, which makes the first light rail vehicle to be retired due to a crash.
- On 11 September 1994, a coach carrying factory workers ran a red light and was crushed between two light rail trains at a junction near Fu Tei. The coach driver and a coach passenger were killed. The two LRV captains were cleared of wrongdoing. The railway inspectorate also said the design of the junction was not to blame. The government said it would implement video recording at LRT junctions, improve road signage between Tuen Mun and Yuen Long, and better educate drivers.
- On 13 January 1995, a light rail train derailed as a result of intentional vandalism to the points at Tin King and Ming Kum roads. The KCRC had not received any threats or warning beforehand.
- On 9 February 2010, a construction crane fell on CSR Phase IV light rail car 1118 as it approached Leung King stop while operating on route 505 for Siu Hong. 18 were injured. The involved car was scrapped in 2012. A replacement car with the same number was bought by MTR in 2015.
- On 17 May 2013, a CSR Phase IV light rail vehicle, cars 1112 and 1117 on route 761P, derailed and crashed while navigating a tight curve at 40.9 km/h, in excess of the posted speed limit of 15 km/h. The train was turning from Kiu Hung Road to Castle Peak Road south of Tin Shui Wai. At least 77 people were injured in the crash. The LRV captain was convicted of negligence under the Mass Transit Railway Ordinance. The front car, 1112, was scrapped after the accident. A replacement car with the same number was bought by MTR shortly after.
- On 19 August 2013, a 63-year-old man was killed at Locwood stop while crossing the tracks at a crossing point; the LRV did not stop in time.
- On 21 November 2014, Comeng Phase I light rail car 1093 on route 507 collided with an MTR double decker bus near Tuen Mun Ferry Terminus. The bus crashed because it ran a red light. The LRV derailed and 20 were injured.
- On 23 July 2023, a LRV on route 614P departing platform 5 of Tuen Mun Ferry Pier stop collided with a train on route 507 departing platform 6. However, there were no injuries. The rail operator is investigating the incident, which it believes was caused by human error. The driver of the route 614P train has been temporarily suspended from driving duties to assist with the investigation.
- On 4 October 2023, two LRVs departing Yuen Long stop, a train on route 761P from platform 5 and an empty train from platform 1, collided at an intersection. 3 of the 120 passengers on board the route 761P train suffered minor injuries. According to preliminary findings by the rail operator, it was suspected that human error had caused the derailment.
- On 18 May 2024, the rear bogie of Comeng Phase I light rail car 1016 derailed near Chung Uk Tsuen stop while the two-car train was heading back to Tuen Mun Depot. The derailment was caused by a wooden board at the spot where the train derailed, which fell off from a truck travelling along Castle Peak Road. The 49-year-old driver was arrested following a police report by the rail operator.

== Gallery ==
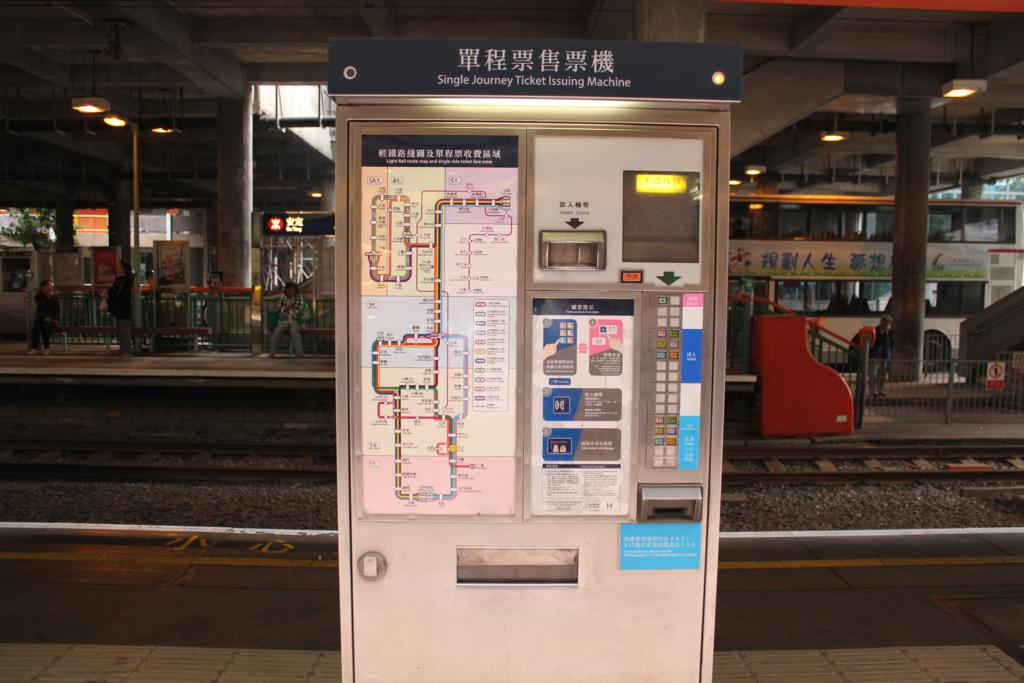
Old Single-ride ticket machine (retired in 2008)

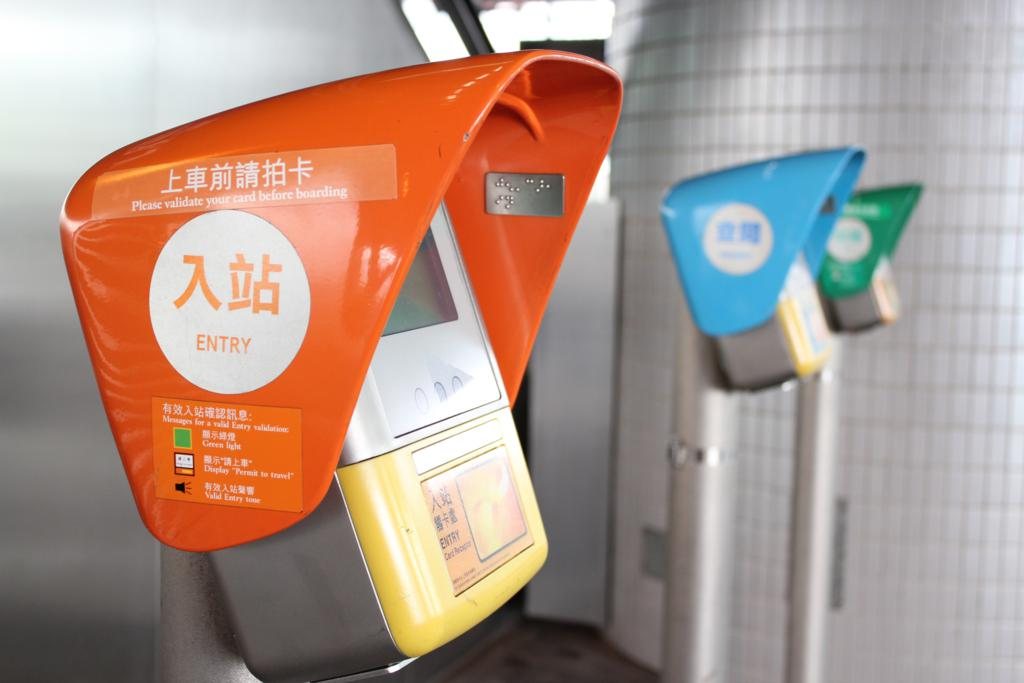
Octopus card processors (used from 2007 until 2019)

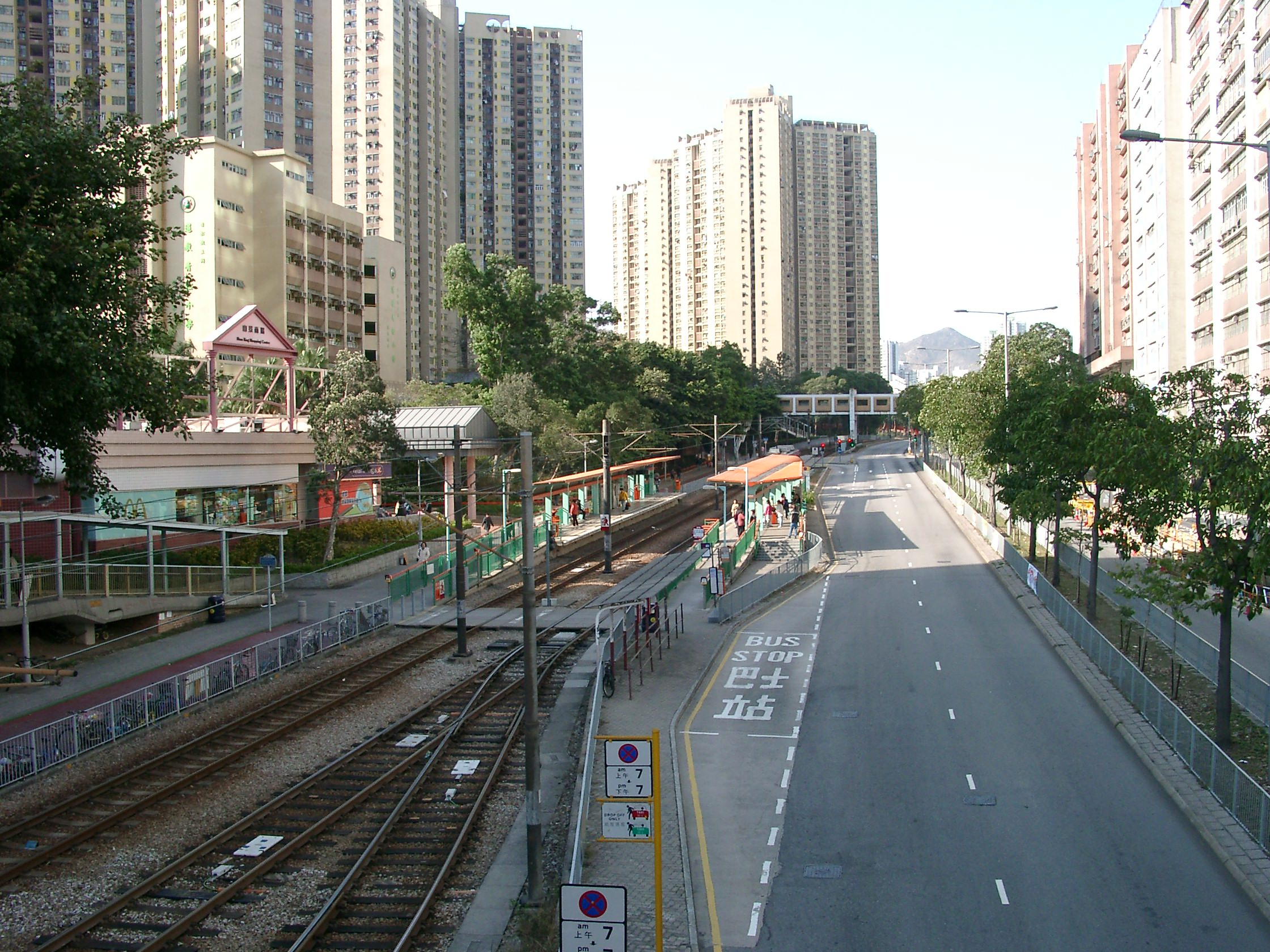
Ming Kum stop

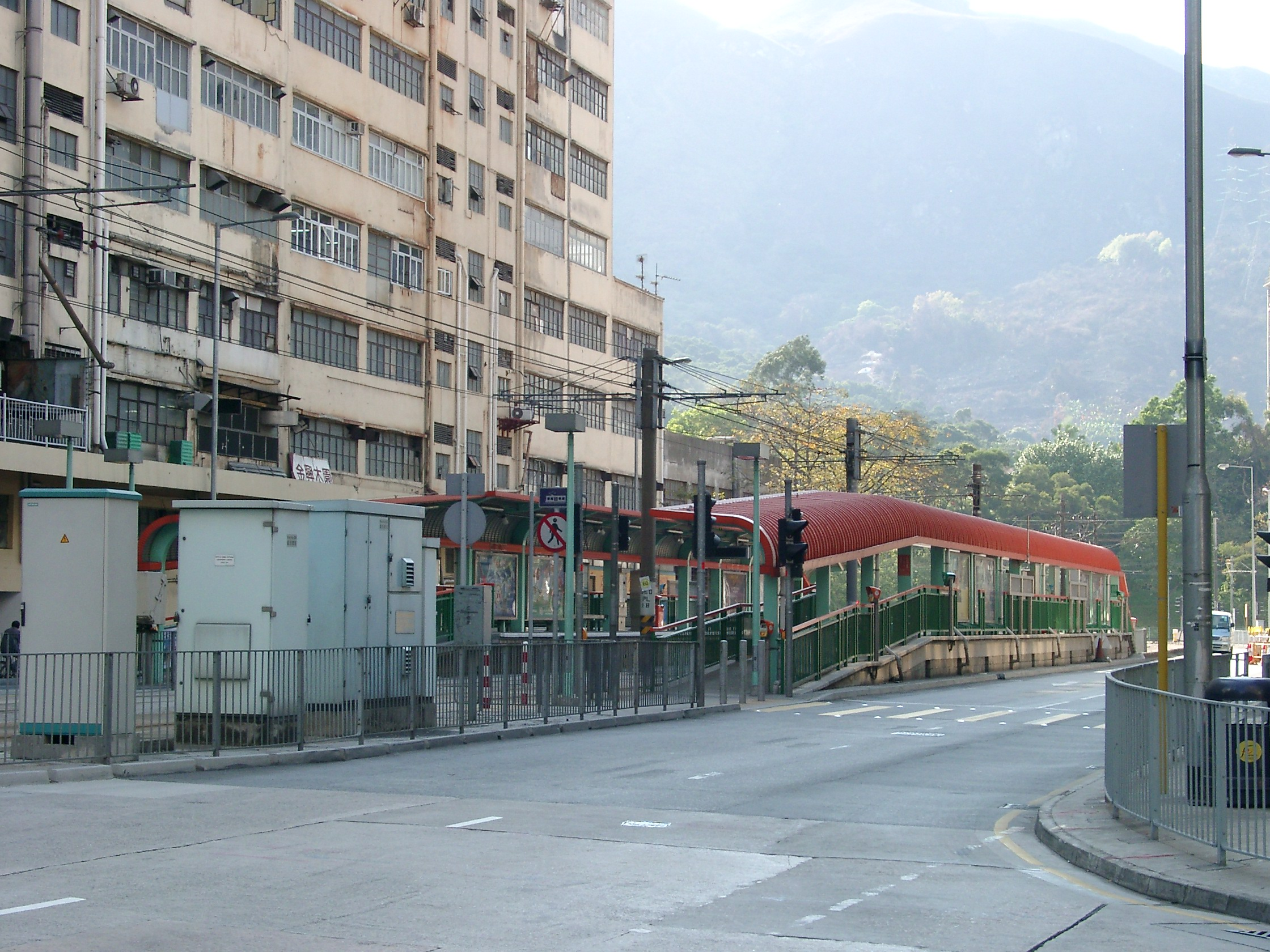
Kin On stop

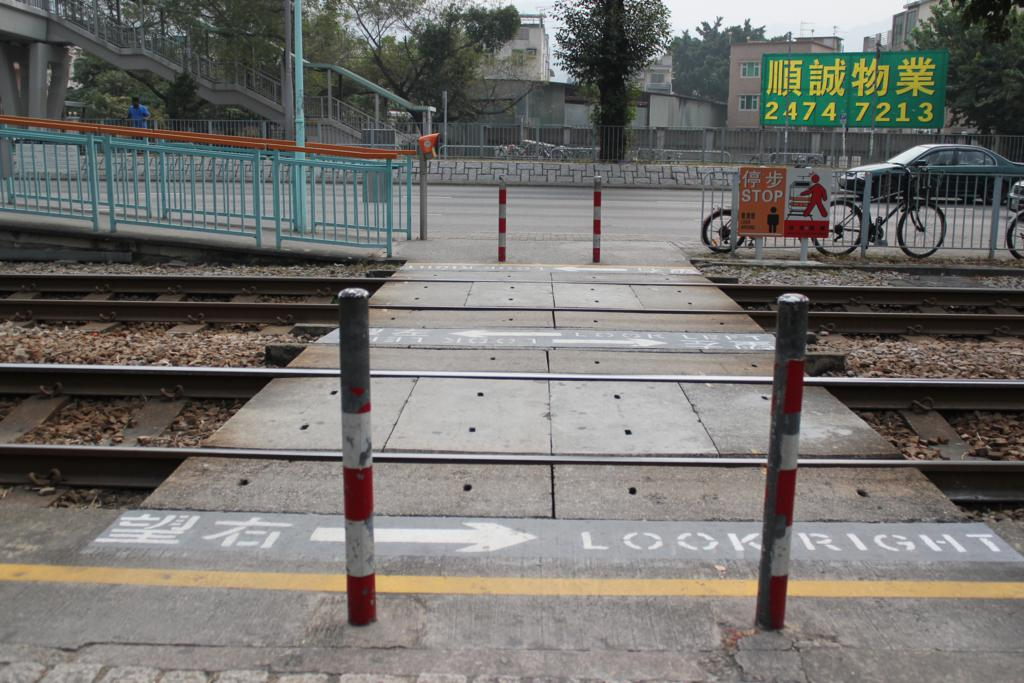
Light rail stop platform crossing

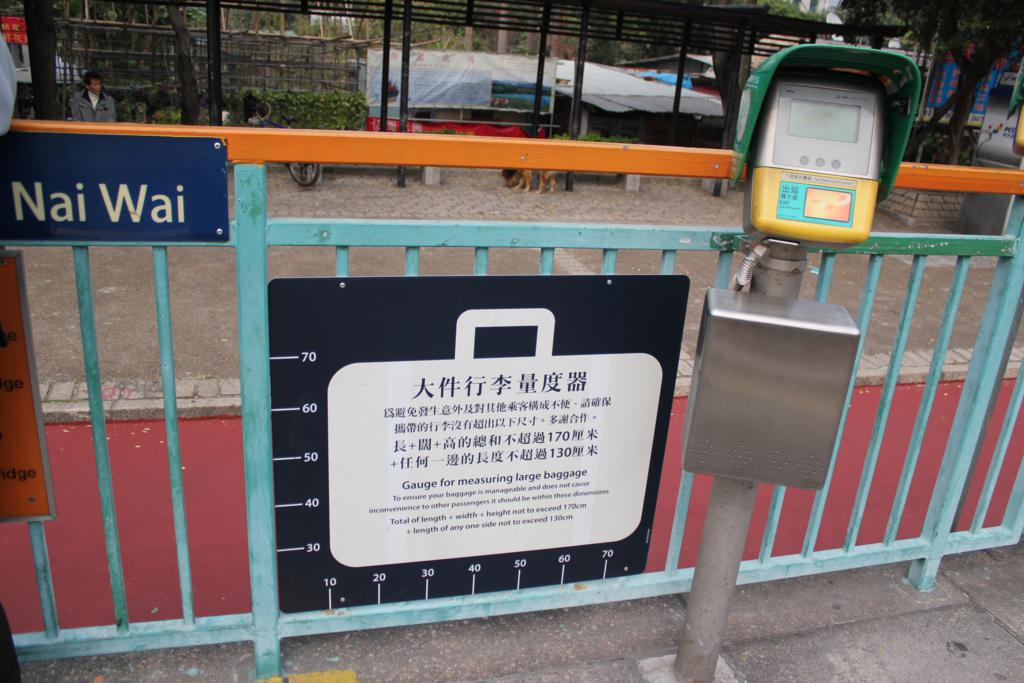
Luggage size gauge

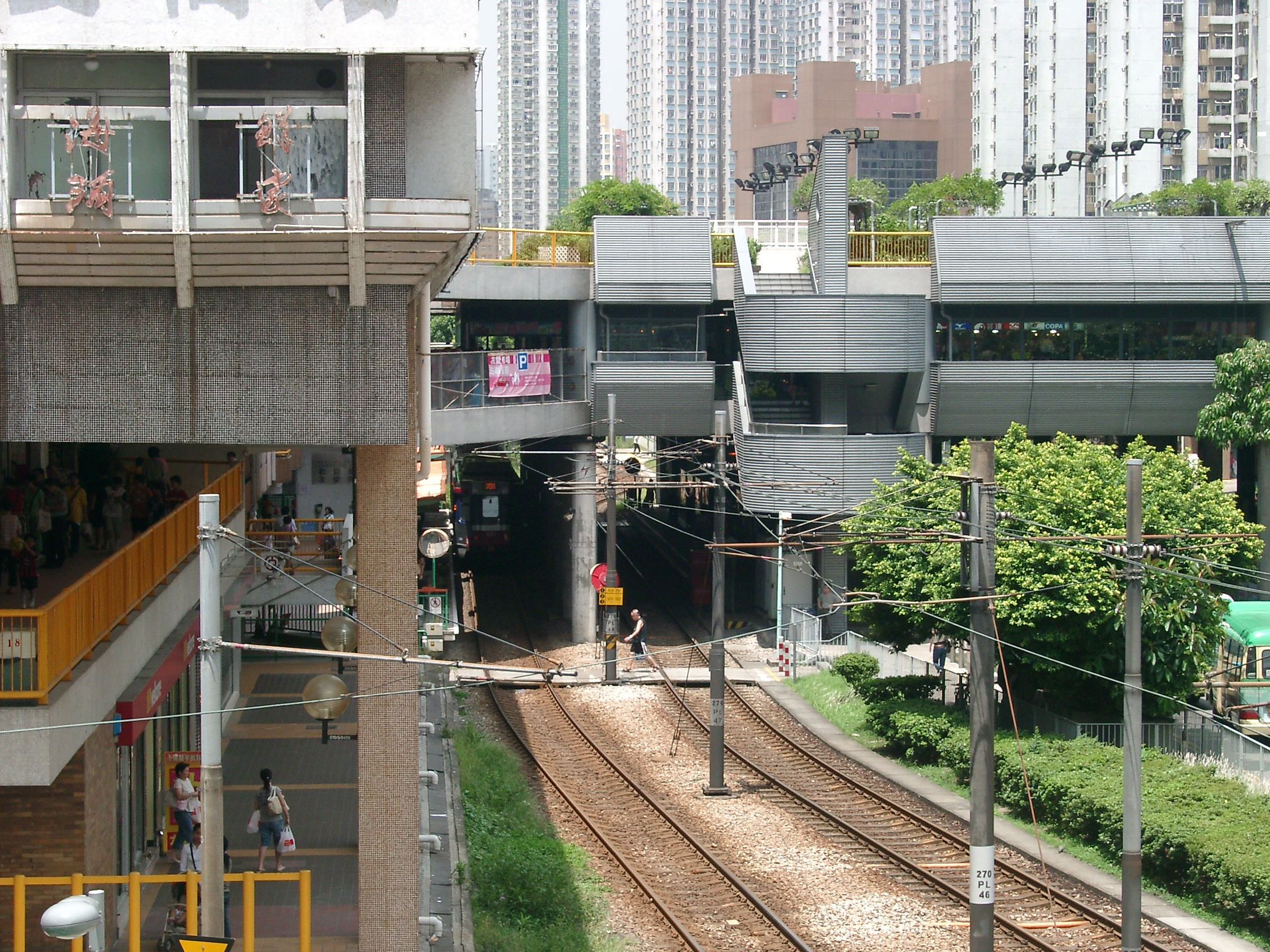
On Ting stop (2006)

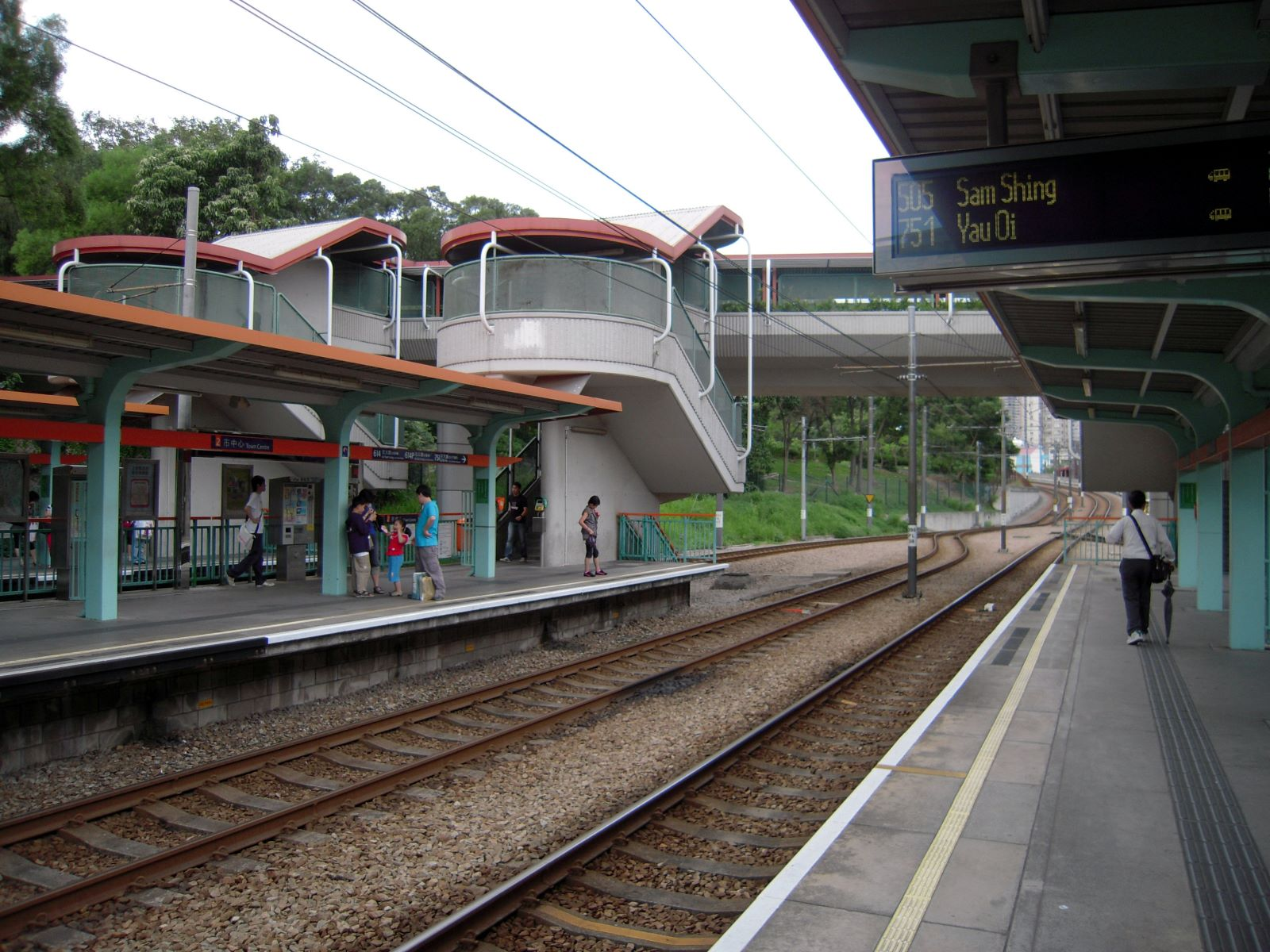
Town Centre stop (platforms shown on the image is recently disused)

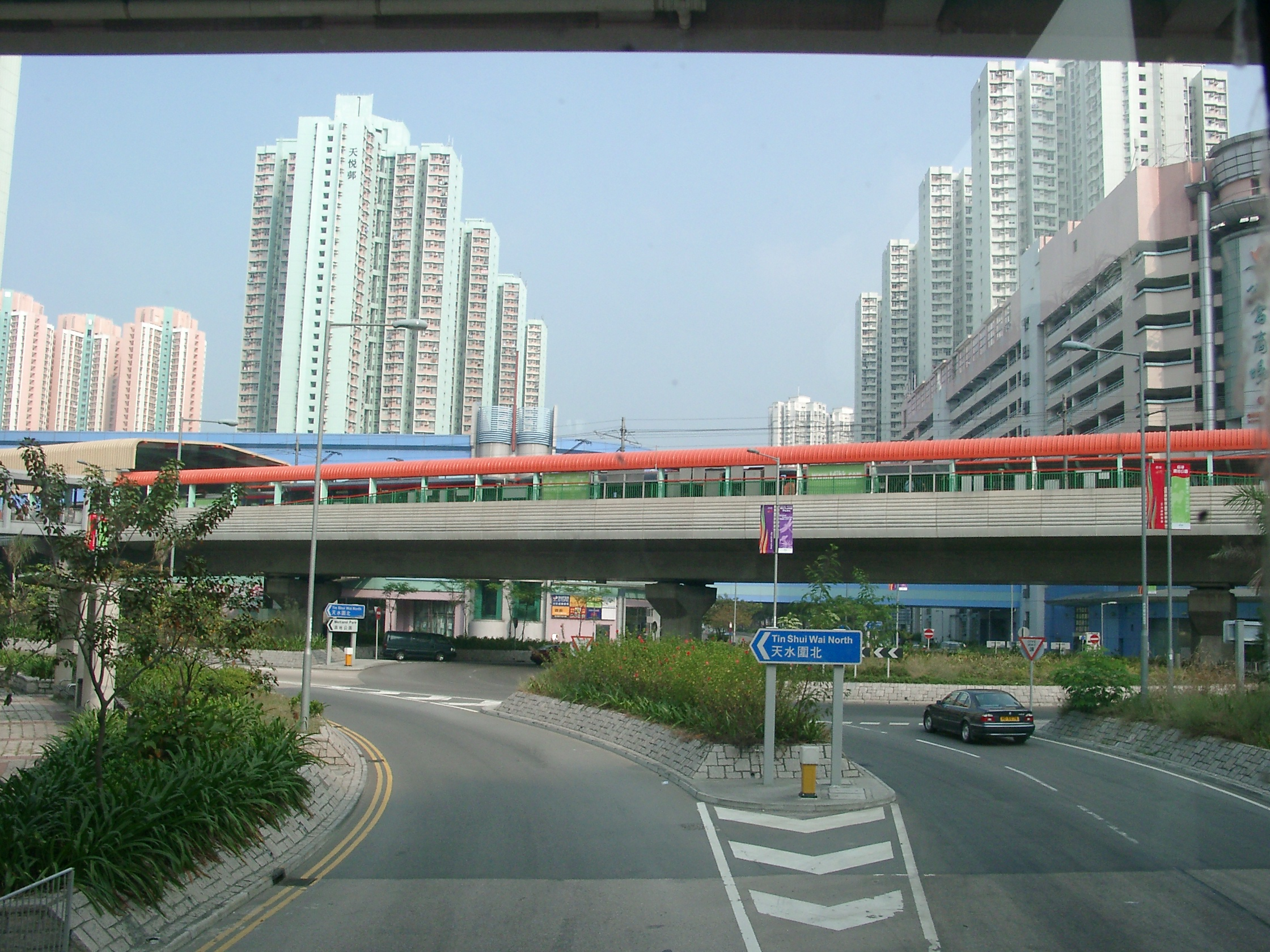
Chung Fu stop (on viaduct)

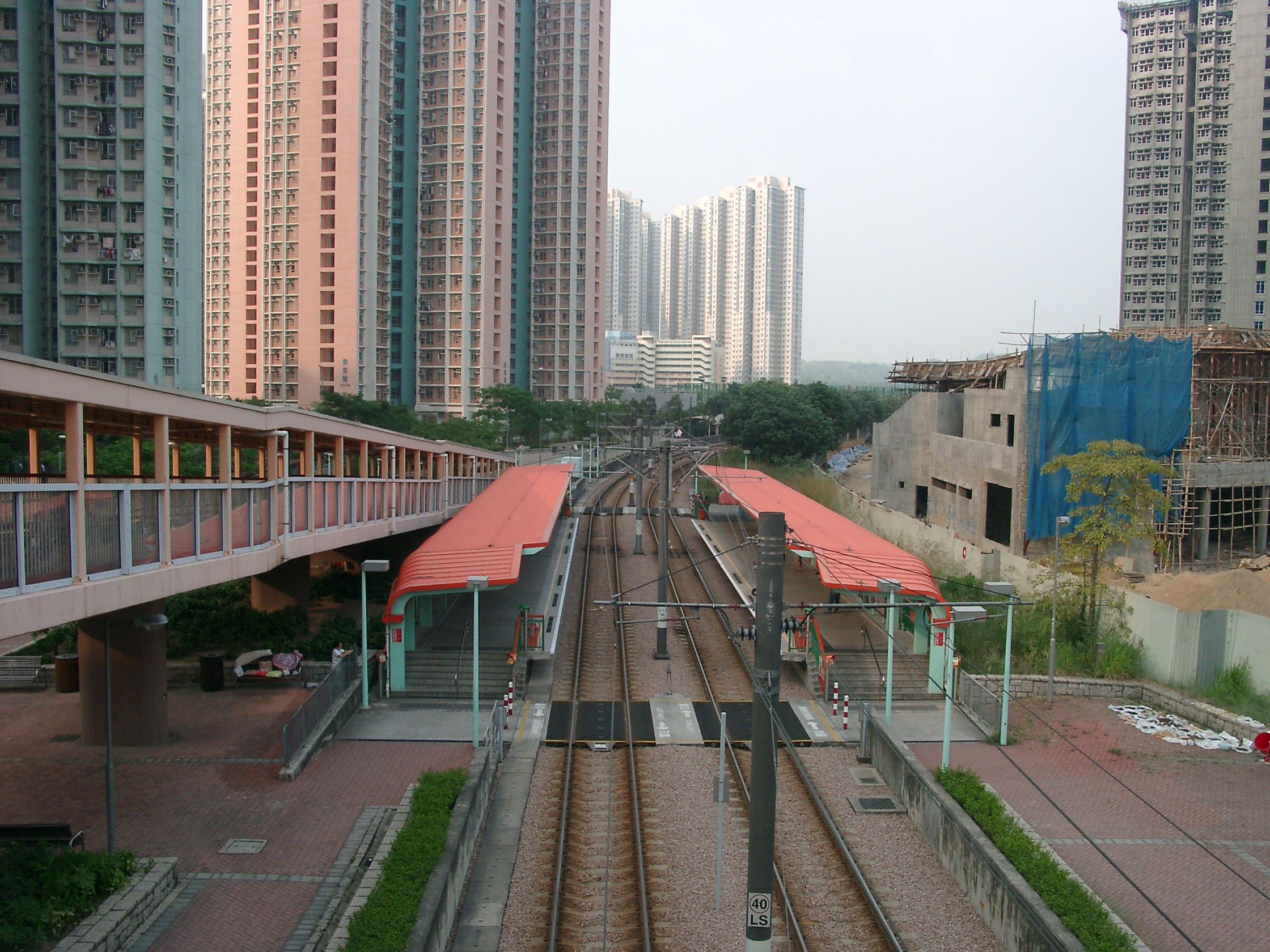
Tin Yuet stop, Tin Yuet Estate is to the left

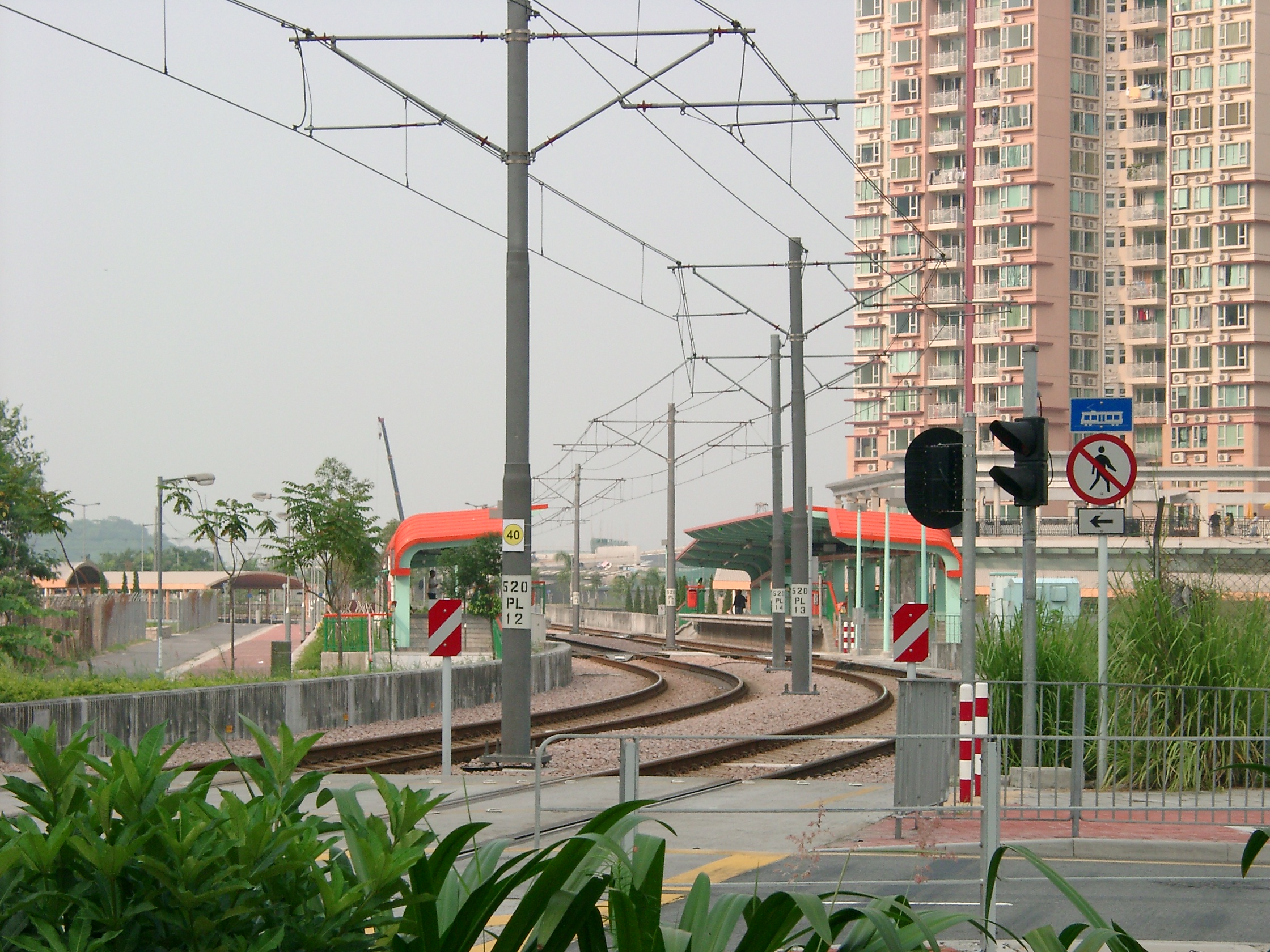
Tin Sau stop, Vianni Cove estate is in the background right

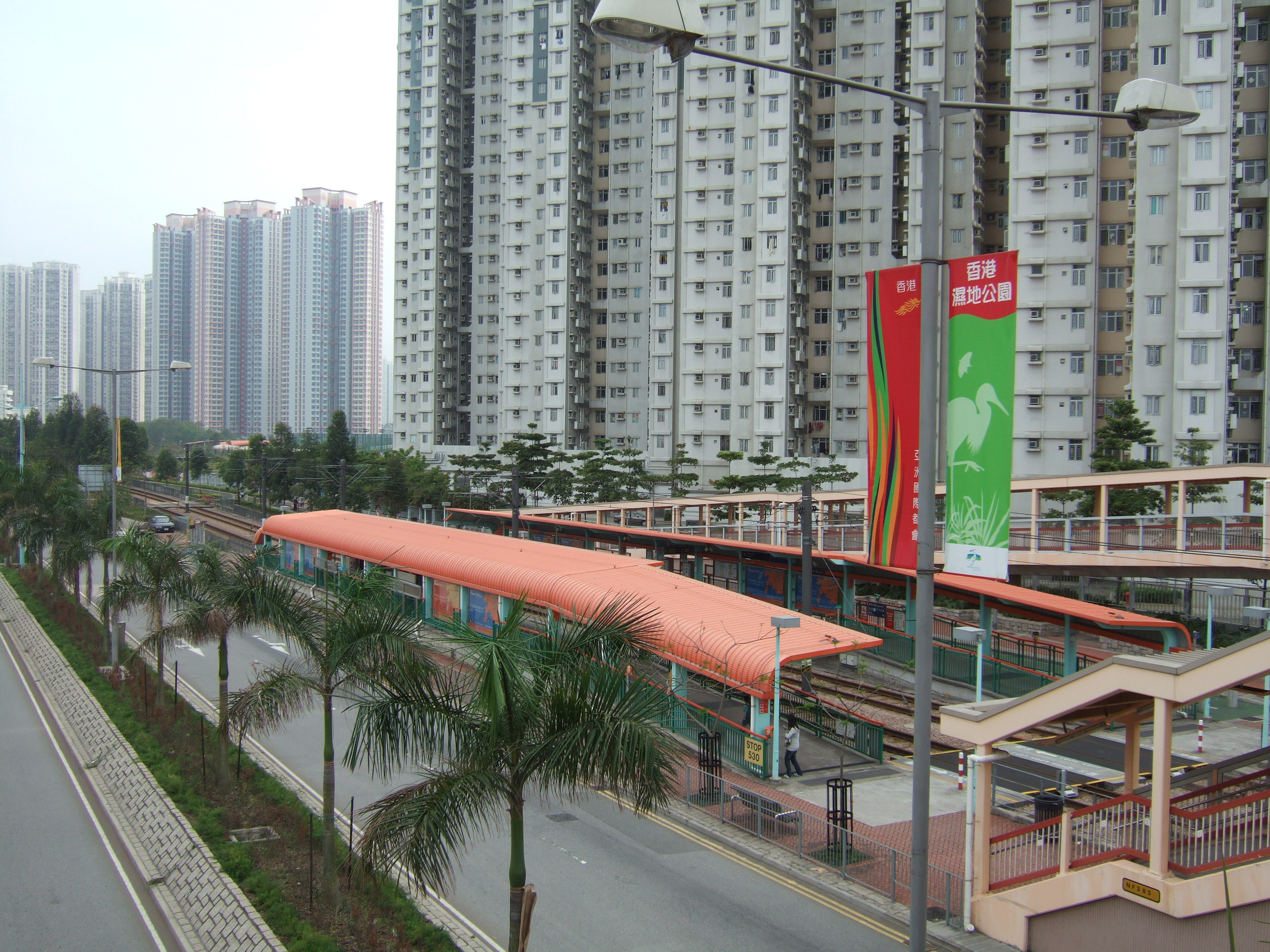
Wetland Park stop
