= Lung Mun stop =

Light rail stop in Tuen Mun, Hong Kong

Coordinates: 22°23′09″N 113°57′55″E

Lung Mun 龍門
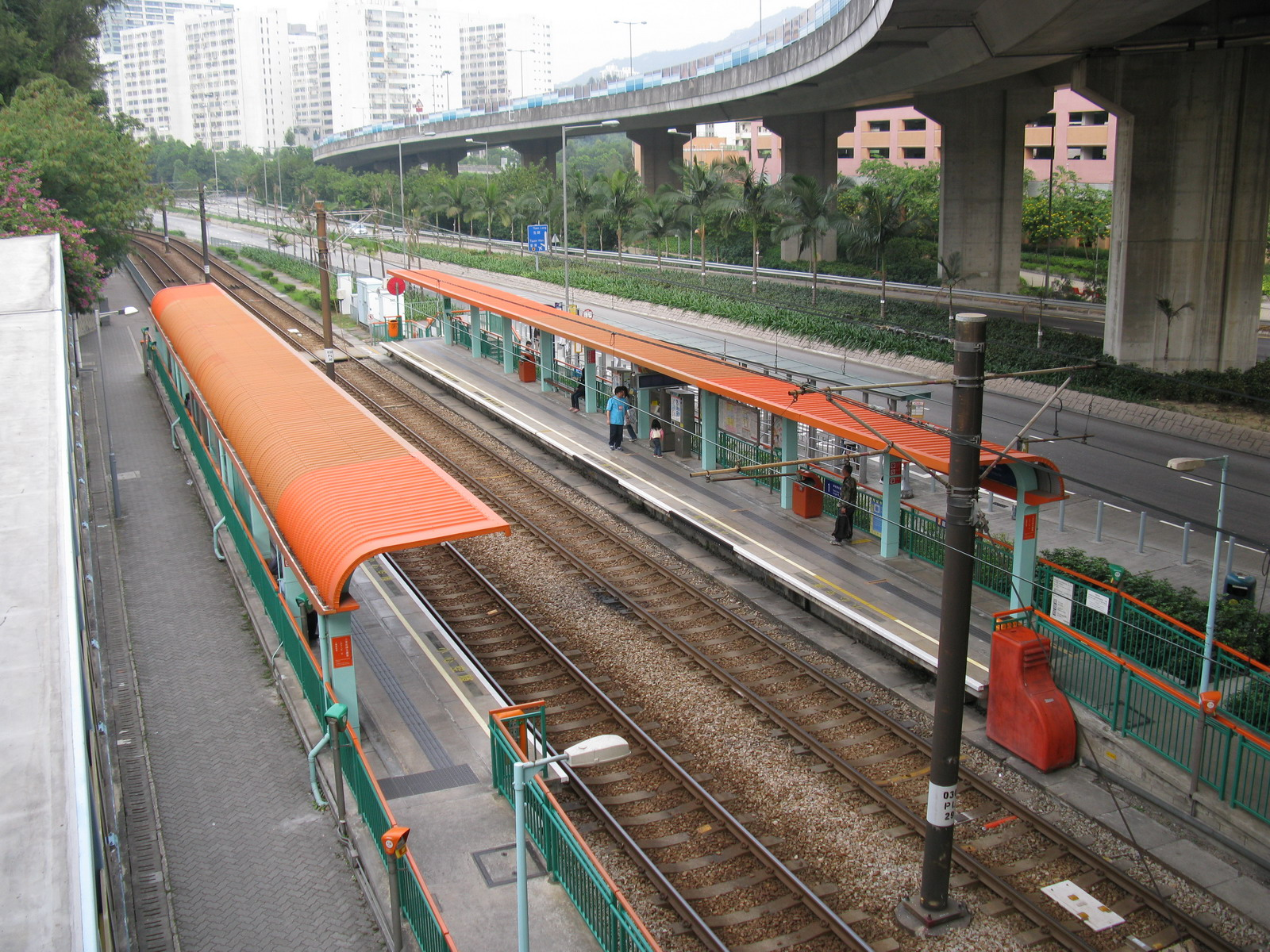
- Lung Mun stop's Platform

General information
- Location: Lung Mun Oasis; Tuen Mun District; Hong Kong
- System: MTR Light Rail stop
- Owner: KCR Corporation
- Operator: MTR Corporation
- Line: 610 615 615P
- Platforms: 2 side platforms
- Tracks: 2
- Connections: Bus, minibus

Construction
- Structure type: At-grade
- Accessible: yes

Other information
- Station code: LUM (English code); 030 (Digital code)
- Fare zone: 1

History
- Opened: 18 September 1988; 37 years ago

Services
Preceding stop	MTR Light Rail	Following stop
Light Rail Depot towards Tuen Mun Ferry Pier	610	Tsing Shan Tsuen towards Yuen Long
Light Rail Depot towards Tuen Mun Ferry Pier	615	Tsing Shan Tsuen towards Yuen Long
Light Rail Depot towards Tuen Mun Ferry Pier	615P	Tsing Shan Tsuen towards Siu Hong
Location
- Location within MTR

Lung Mun (Chinese: 龍門) is a station in Hong Kong's MTR Light Rail system. It is located at ground level of Lung Mun Road near Lung Mun Oasis in Tuen Mun District. It began service on 18 September 1988 and is located in Zone 1. It serves Lung Mun Oasis and Glorious Garden.

== History ==
This stop was originally named "Hung Lau" (Chinese: 紅樓). It was then renamed to "San Shek Wan" (Chinese: 散石灣) in 1989. It was renamed again to the current "Lung Mun" in 2003 after Lung Mun Oasis was occupied in 1998.
