= Ming Kum stop =

Light rail stop in Hong Kong

Coordinates: 22°23′54″N 113°58′02″E

Ming Kum 鳴琴
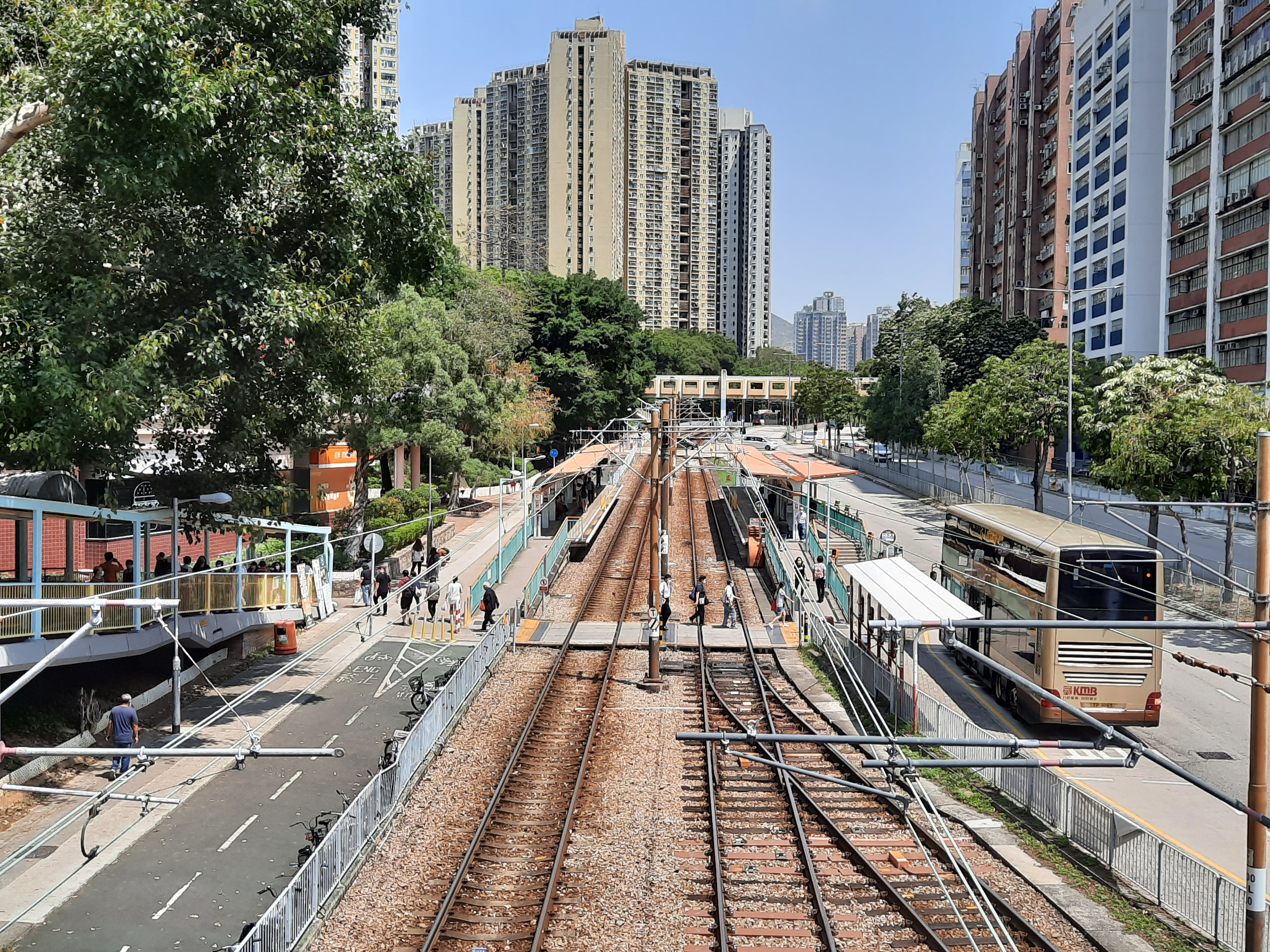
- Ming Kum stop, taken from a bridge

General information
- Location: Ming Kum Road; Tuen Mun District; Hong Kong
- System: MTR Light Rail stop
- Owner: KCR Corporation
- Operator: MTR Corporation
- Line: 505 610 615 615P
- Platforms: 2 side platforms
- Tracks: 2
- Connections: Bus, minibus

Construction
- Structure type: At-grade
- Accessible: yes

Other information
- Station code: MIK (English code); 200 (Digital code)
- Fare zone: 2

History
- Opened: 18 September 1988; 37 years ago

Services
Preceding stop	MTR Light Rail	Following stop
Kin On towards Sam Shing	505	Shek Pai One-way operation
Tsing Wun towards Tuen Mun Ferry Pier	610	Shek Pai towards Yuen Long
Tsing Wun towards Tuen Mun Ferry Pier	615	Shek Pai towards Yuen Long
Tsing Wun towards Tuen Mun Ferry Pier	615P	Shek Pai towards Siu Hong
Location
- Location within MTR

Ming Kum (Chinese: 鳴琴) is an at-grade MTR Light Rail stop located at Ming Kum Road in Tuen Mun District, near Shan King Estate. It began service on 18 September 1988 and belongs to Zone 2. It serves Shan King Estate and nearby industrial areas.

Line 505 is only routed via Ming Kum stop in Sam Shing direction. It is routed via Shan King (South) and Shan King (North) in Siu Hong direction.
