= Shek Pai stop =

Light rail stop in Hong Kong

Shek Pai 石排
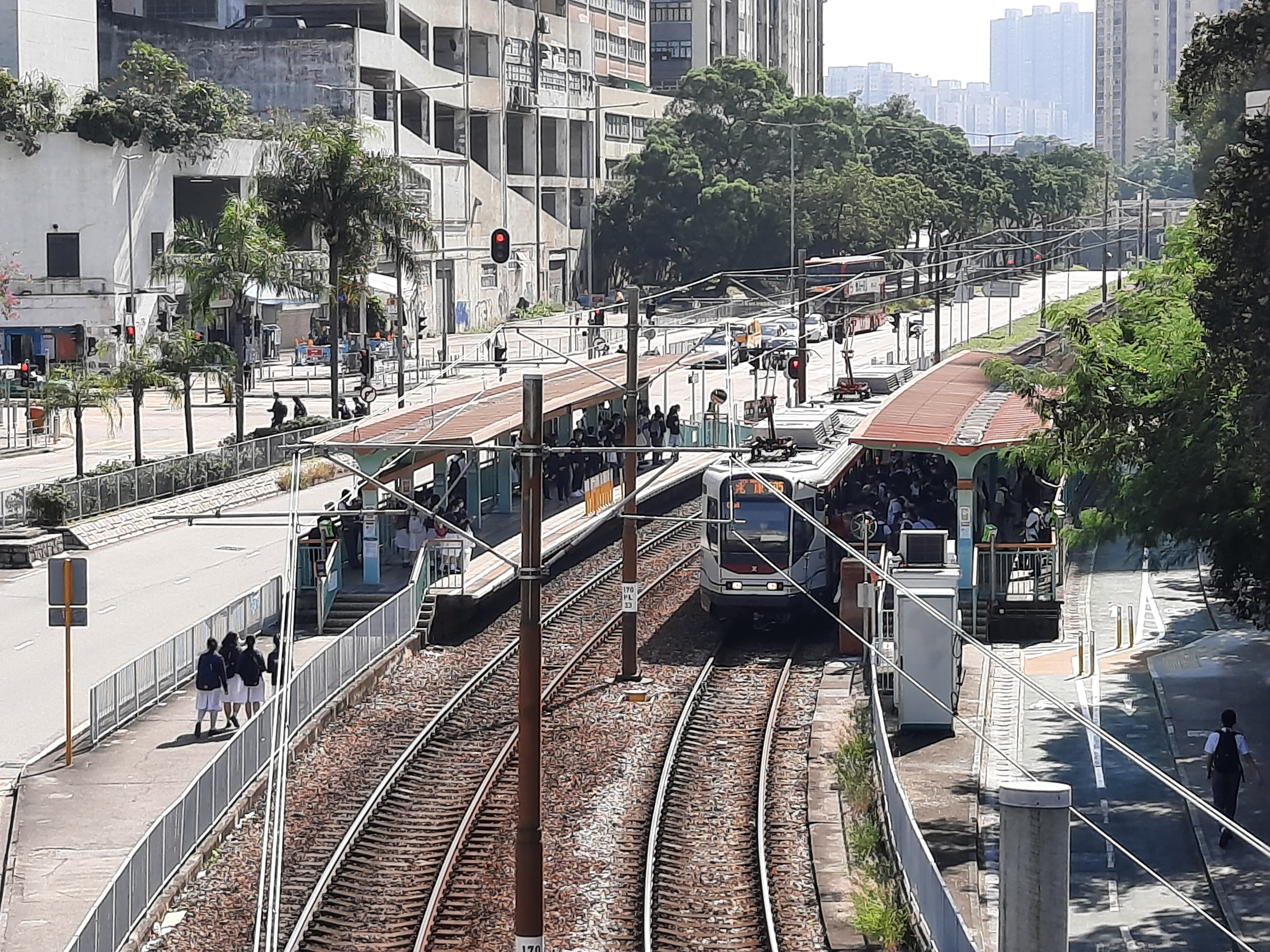
- Shek Pai stop's Platform, taken on a footbridge.

General information
- Location: Shek Pai Tau Road, Tuen Mun; Tuen Mun District; Hong Kong
- Coordinates: 22°24′05″N 113°58′04″E
- System: MTR Light Rail stop
- Owner: KCR Corporation
- Operator: MTR Corporation
- Line: 505 610 615 615P
- Platforms: 2 side platforms
- Tracks: 2
- Connections: Bus, minibus

Construction
- Structure type: At-grade
- Accessible: yes

Other information
- Station code: SHP (English code); 170 (Digital code)
- Fare zone: 2

History
- Opened: 18 September 1988; 37 years ago

Services
Preceding stop	MTR Light Rail	Following stop
Shan King (North) One-way operation	505	San Wai towards Siu Hong
Ming Kum towards Sam Shing	505	San Wai towards Siu Hong
Ming Kum towards Tuen Mun Ferry Pier	610	Tai Hing (North) towards Yuen Long
Ming Kum towards Tuen Mun Ferry Pier	615	San Wai towards Yuen Long
Ming Kum towards Tuen Mun Ferry Pier	615P	San Wai towards Siu Hong
Location
- Location within MTR

Shek Pai (Chinese: 石排) is an at-grade MTR Light Rail stop located at the junction of Shek Pai Tau Road and Ming Kum Road in Tuen Mun District. It began service on 18 September 1988 and belongs to Zone 2.
