= Light Rail Depot stop =

Light rail stop in Tuen Mun, Hong Kong

Coordinates: 22°22′55″N 113°57′48″E

Light Rail Depot 輕鐵車廠
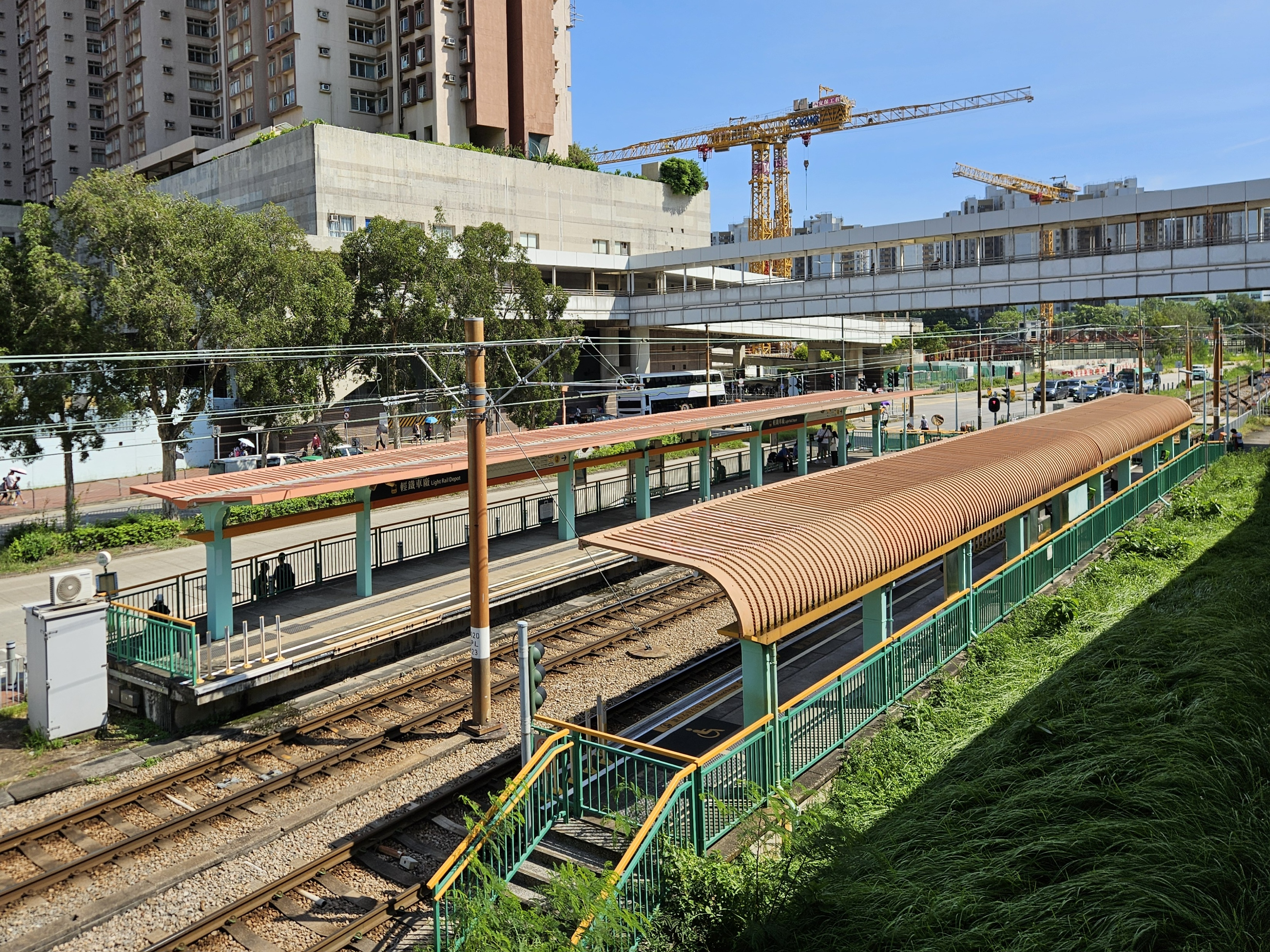
- LRT Depot stop's Platform

General information
- Location: Tuen Mun Depot and Sun Tuen Mun Centre; Tuen Mun District; Hong Kong
- System: MTR Light Rail stop
- Owner: KCR Corporation
- Operator: MTR Corporation
- Line: 610 615 615P
- Platforms: 2 side platforms
- Tracks: 2
- Connections: Bus, minibus

Construction
- Structure type: At-grade
- Accessible: yes

Other information
- Station code: LRD (English code); 020 (Digital code)
- Fare zone: 1

History
- Opened: 18 September 1988; 37 years ago
- Former names: Pak Kok (Until 1989); LRT Depot (1989-2010)

Services
Preceding stop	MTR Light Rail	Following stop
Butterfly towards Tuen Mun Ferry Pier	610	Lung Mun towards Yuen Long
Butterfly towards Tuen Mun Ferry Pier	615	Lung Mun towards Yuen Long
Butterfly towards Tuen Mun Ferry Pier	615P	Lung Mun towards Siu Hong
Location
- Location within MTR

Light Rail Depot (Chinese: 輕鐵車廠) is an MTR Light Rail stop. It is located at ground level at the junction of Lung Mun Road and Tuen Tsing Lane, near Tuen Mun Depot and Sun Tuen Mun Centre, in Tuen Mun District. It began service on 18 September 1988 and belongs to Zone 1.

== History ==
This stop was originally named "Pak Kok" (Chinese: 白角) as it was located at a point called Pak Kok before Butterfly Bay was reclaimed. It was then renamed to "LRT Depot" in 1989 (LRT was the abbreviation of Light Rail Transit, the name for the Light Rail system until the early 1990s). On 13 June 2010, the stop was renamed Light Rail Depot stop, while the Chinese name remained unchanged.
