= Shan King (North) stop =

Light rail stop in Tuen Mun, Hong Kong

Coordinates: 22°23′56″N 113°57′59″E

Shan King (North) 山景 (北)
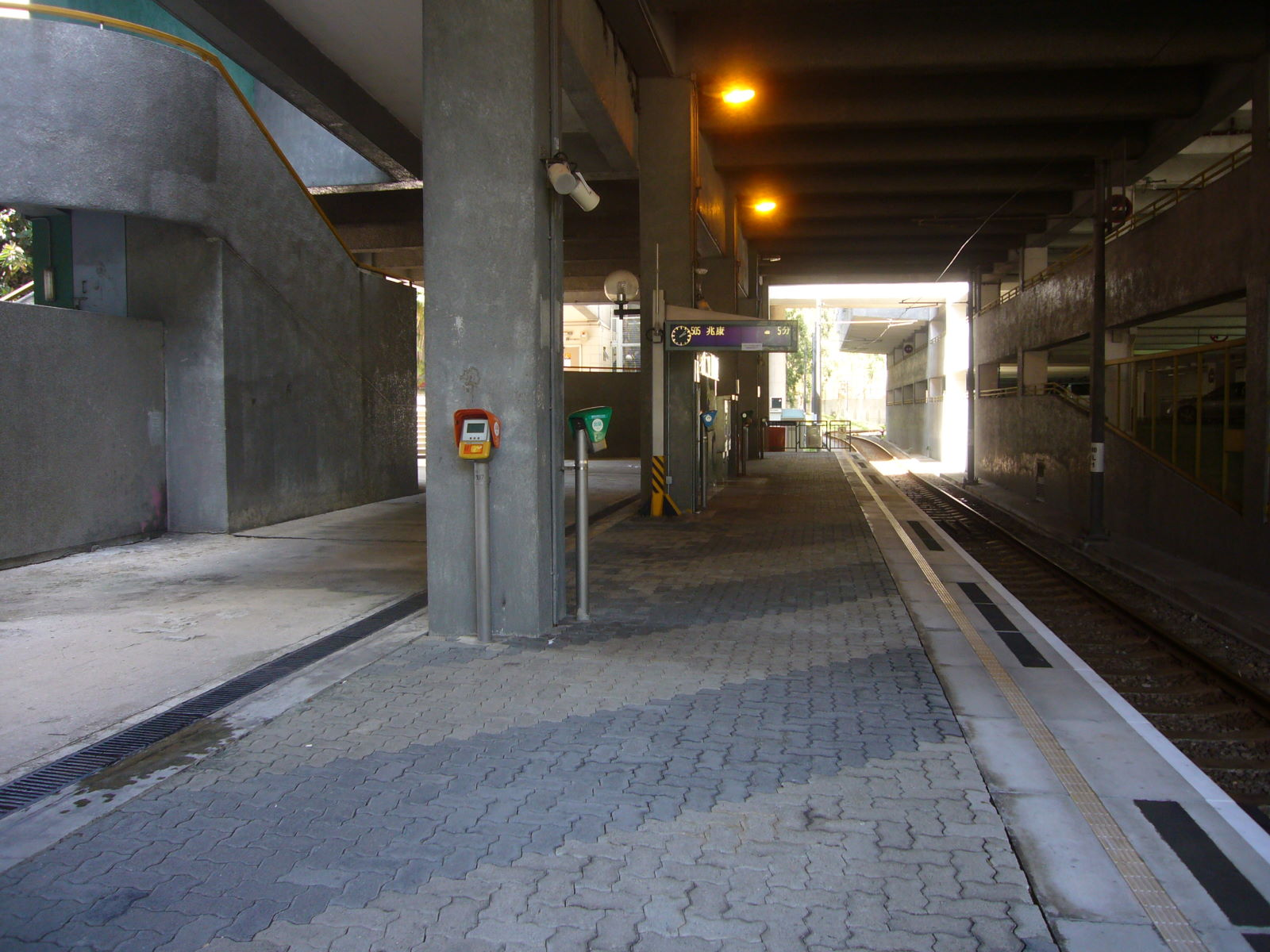
- Shan King (North) stop platform

General information
- Location: Shan King Estate; Tuen Mun District; Hong Kong
- System: MTR Light Rail stop
- Owner: KCR Corporation
- Operator: MTR Corporation
- Line: 505
- Platforms: 1 side platform
- Tracks: 1
- Connections: Bus, minibus

Construction
- Structure type: At-grade
- Accessible: yes

Other information
- Station code: SKN (English code); 180 (Digital code)
- Fare zone: 2

History
- Opened: 24 September 1988; 37 years ago

Services
Preceding stop	MTR Light Rail	Following stop
Shan King (South) One-way operation	505	Shek Pai towards Siu Hong
Location
- Location within MTR

Shan King (North) (Chinese: 山景 (北)) is an at-grade MTR Light Rail stop located at Shan King Estate Car Park, Shan King Estate in Tuen Mun District, Hong Kong. It began service on 24 September 1988 and belongs to Zone 2. It serves the north of Shan King Estate.

There is only one platform in Shan King North stop for Line 505. Line 505 is routed via Shan King North and Shan King South in Siu Hong direction and is routed via Ming Kum in Sam Shing direction.
