= Ho Tin stop =

Light rail stop in Tuen Mun, Hong Kong

Coordinates: 22°23′50″N 113°58′22″E

Ho Tin 河田
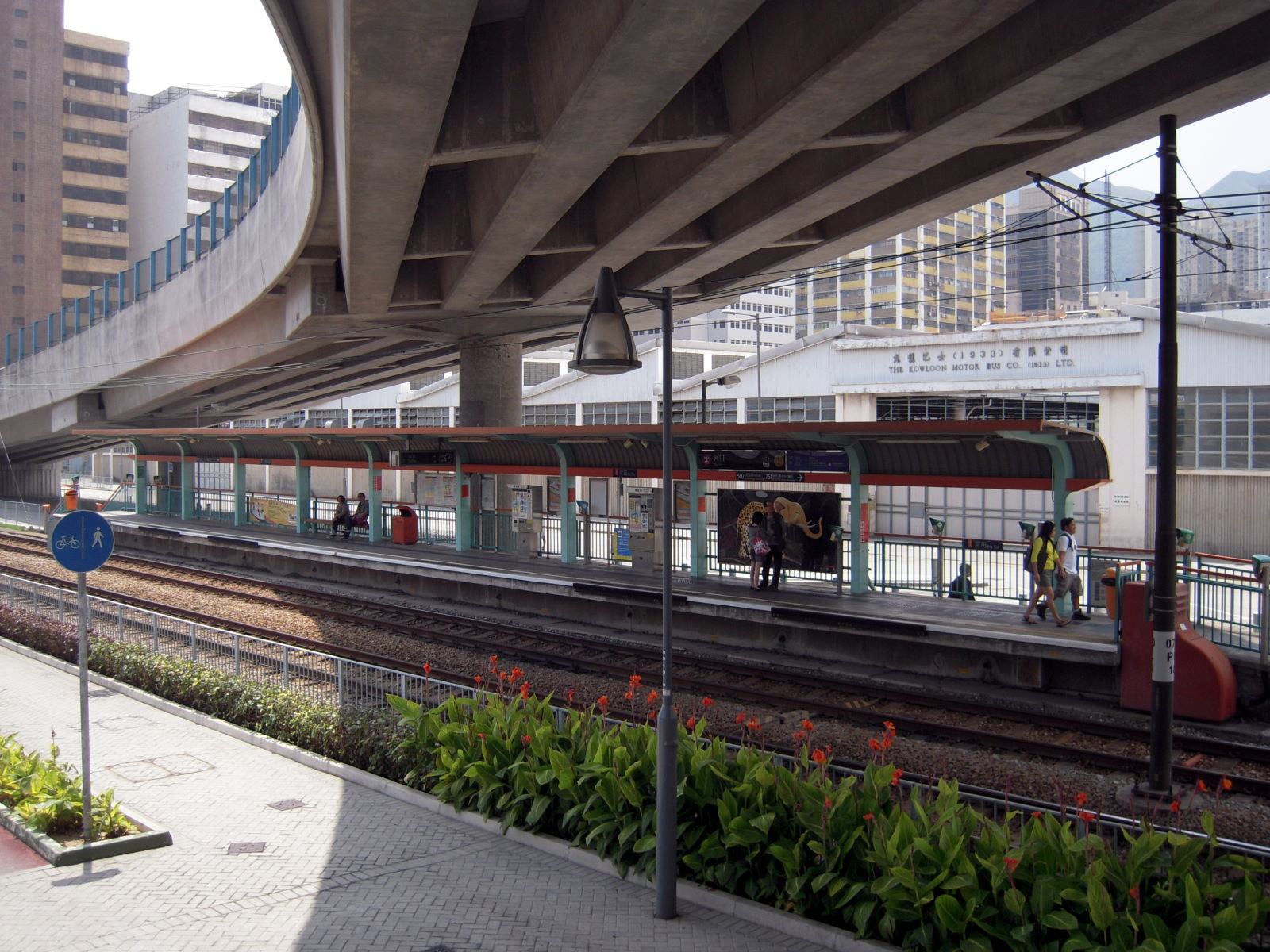
- Ho Tin stop platforms 1 (507) and 2 (751)

General information
- Location: Kin Fung Circuit; Tuen Mun District; Hong Kong
- System: MTR Light Rail stop
- Owner: KCR Corporation
- Operator: MTR Corporation
- Line: 507 751
- Platforms: 2 side platforms
- Tracks: 2
- Connections: Bus, minibus

Construction
- Structure type: At-grade
- Accessible: yes

Other information
- Station code: HOT (English code); 070 (Digital code)
- Fare zone: 2

History
- Opened: 18 September 1988; 37 years ago

Services
Preceding stop	MTR Light Rail	Following stop
Tuen Mun towards Tuen Mun Ferry Pier	507	Choy Yee Bridge towards Tin King
Tuen Mun towards Yau Oi	751	Choy Yee Bridge towards Tin Yat
Location
- Location within MTR

Ho Tin (Chinese: 河田), named after nearby Ho Tin Street, is an at-grade MTR Light Rail stop located at Kin Fung Circuit, opposite to Tuen Mun River and Tuen Mun station in Tuen Mun District. It began service on 18 September 1988 and belongs to Zone 2. It serves the nearby industrial area.

== See also ==
- Light Rail (MTR)
- Tuen Mun District
- Tuen Mun
- Tuen Mun stop (preceding stop), which is an interchange station for the Tuen Ma line as well.
- Choy Yee Bridge stop (following stop)
- Tuen Mun River
