= Tai Hing Estate =

Public housing estate in Tuen Mun, Hong Kong

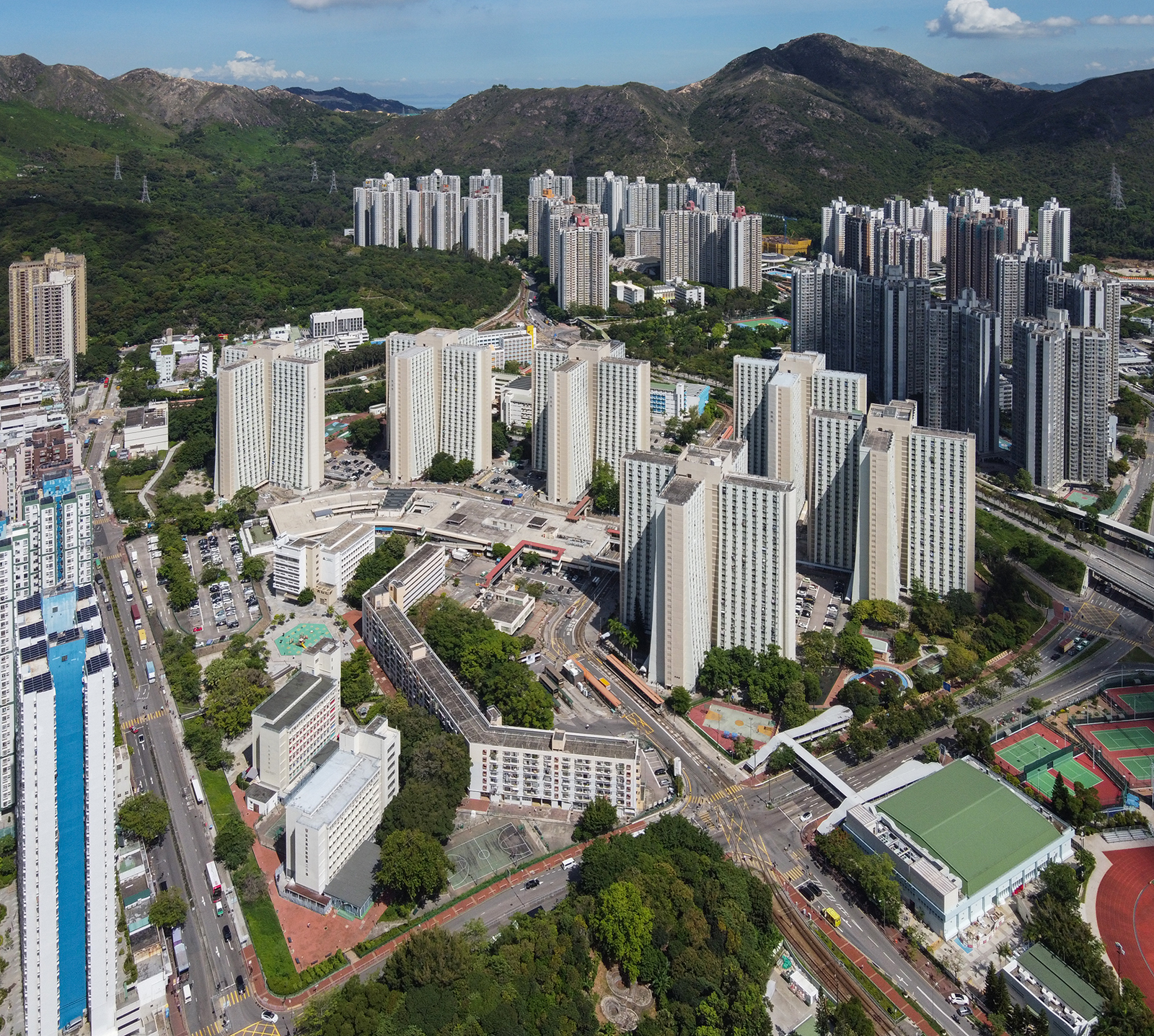
- Tai Hing Estate in 2021.
- Interactive map of Tai Hing Estate

General information
- Location: 2-6, Tai Fong Street and 2-6, Tai Hing Street, Tuen Mun District, Hong Kong
- Coordinates: 22.3997°N 113.9717°E
- Status: Completed
- Category: Public rental housing
- Area: 237-509 ft²
- Population: 19,000
- No. of blocks: 7
- No. of units: 8,641

Construction
- Constructed: 1977; 49 years ago, 1980; 46 years ago
- Authority: Hong Kong Housing Authority

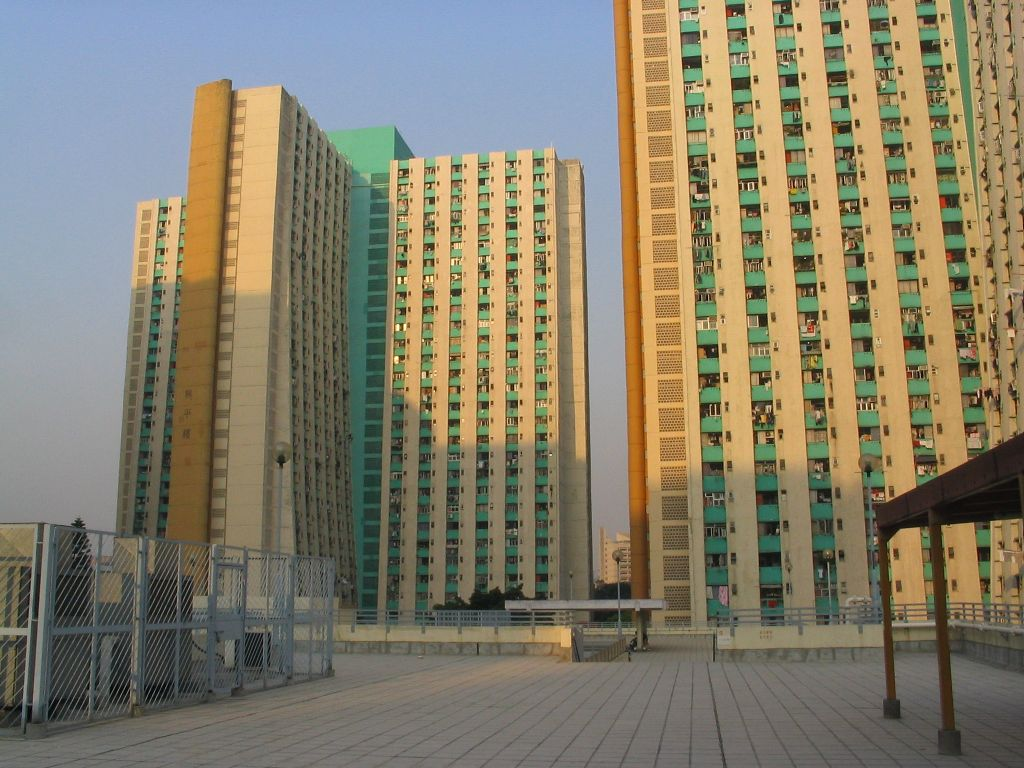
Tai Hing Estate

Tai Hing Estate (Chinese: 大興邨) is the second public housing estate and the oldest existing public housing estate in Tuen Mun, New Territories, Hong Kong. There are 8,602 flats on the estate with capacity to house 21,100 people.

It is also a district council constituency. It is a traditional strong pro-democratic area, having returned Albert Ho as district councillor in the Legislative Council.

== History ==
Tai Hing Estate is the oldest existing public housing estate in Tuen Mun District. The site was previously farms near the coastline of Castle Peak Bay before the land reclamation of the bay for the construction of Tuen Mun New Town.

For the 60th anniversary of Hong Kong Scouting, the Scout Association of Hong Kong held the Diamond Jubilee Jamboree (鑽禧大露營) for 5000 Scouts, applying the theme World Harmony (大同) from 23 July 1971 to 29 July 1971 in present-day Tai Hing Estate in Castle Peak. The event was originally planned to be held from 22 July 1971 to 28 July 1971, but was pushed back one day later because of the typhoon attack to Hong Kong. The jamboree was seriously affected by the bad weather. The campsite was flooded and facilities were damaged. Campers had to retreat to San Fat Estate in Tuen Mun for shelter overnight. The Hong Kong Post Office issued a set of three stamps for the jamboree on 23 July.

== Facilities ==
Tai Hing Estate is in Primary One Admission (POA) School Net 70. Within the school net are multiple aided schools (operated independently but funded with government money) and the following government schools: Tuen Mun Government Primary School (屯門官立小學).

There are five secondary schools, three primary schools, two kindergartens, a market, a public library, a swimming pool and a post office in Tai Hing.

Tai Hing Public Library of Hong Kong Public Libraries is in the Commercial Complex in Tai Hing Estate.

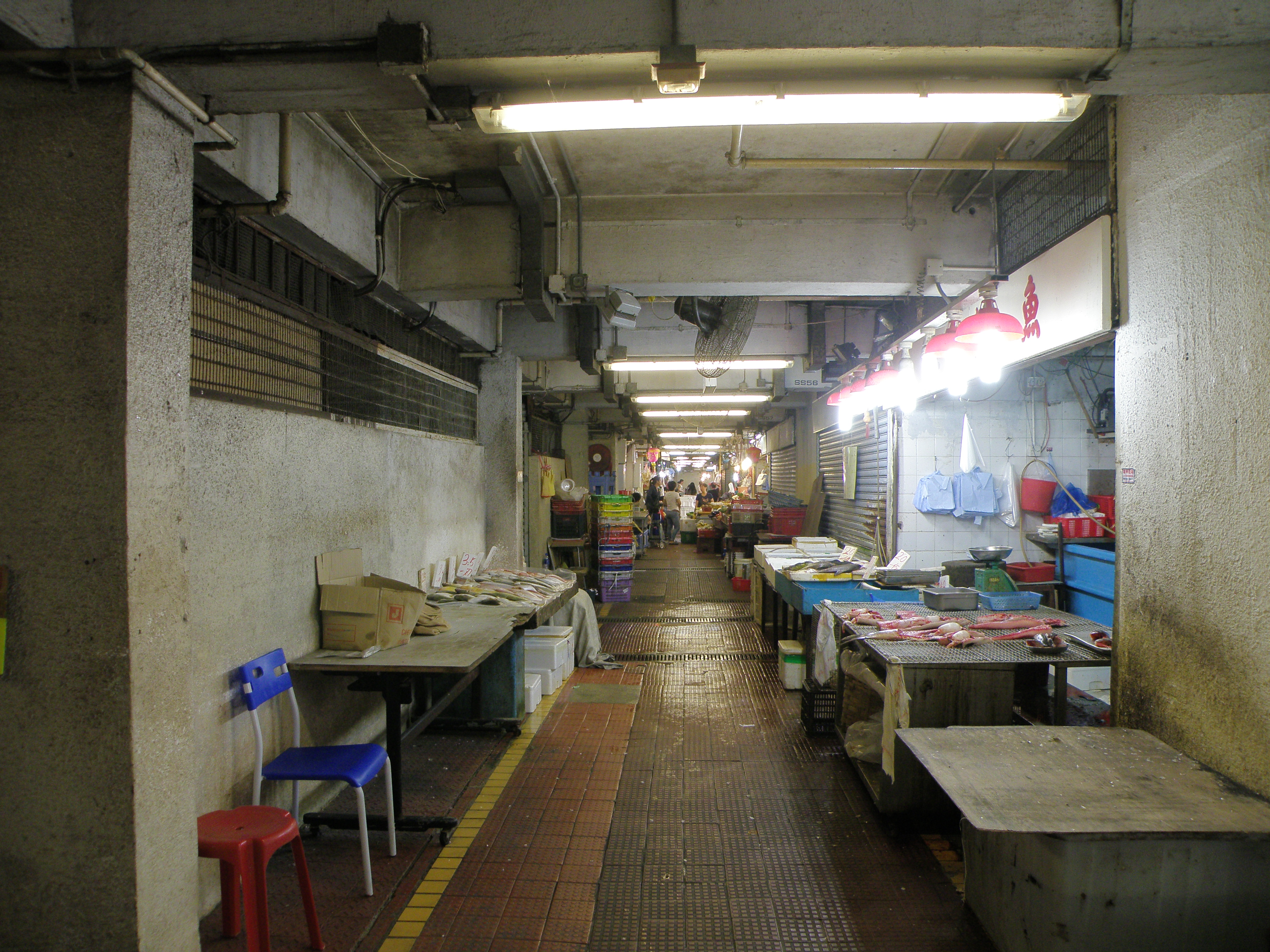
Tai Hing Market

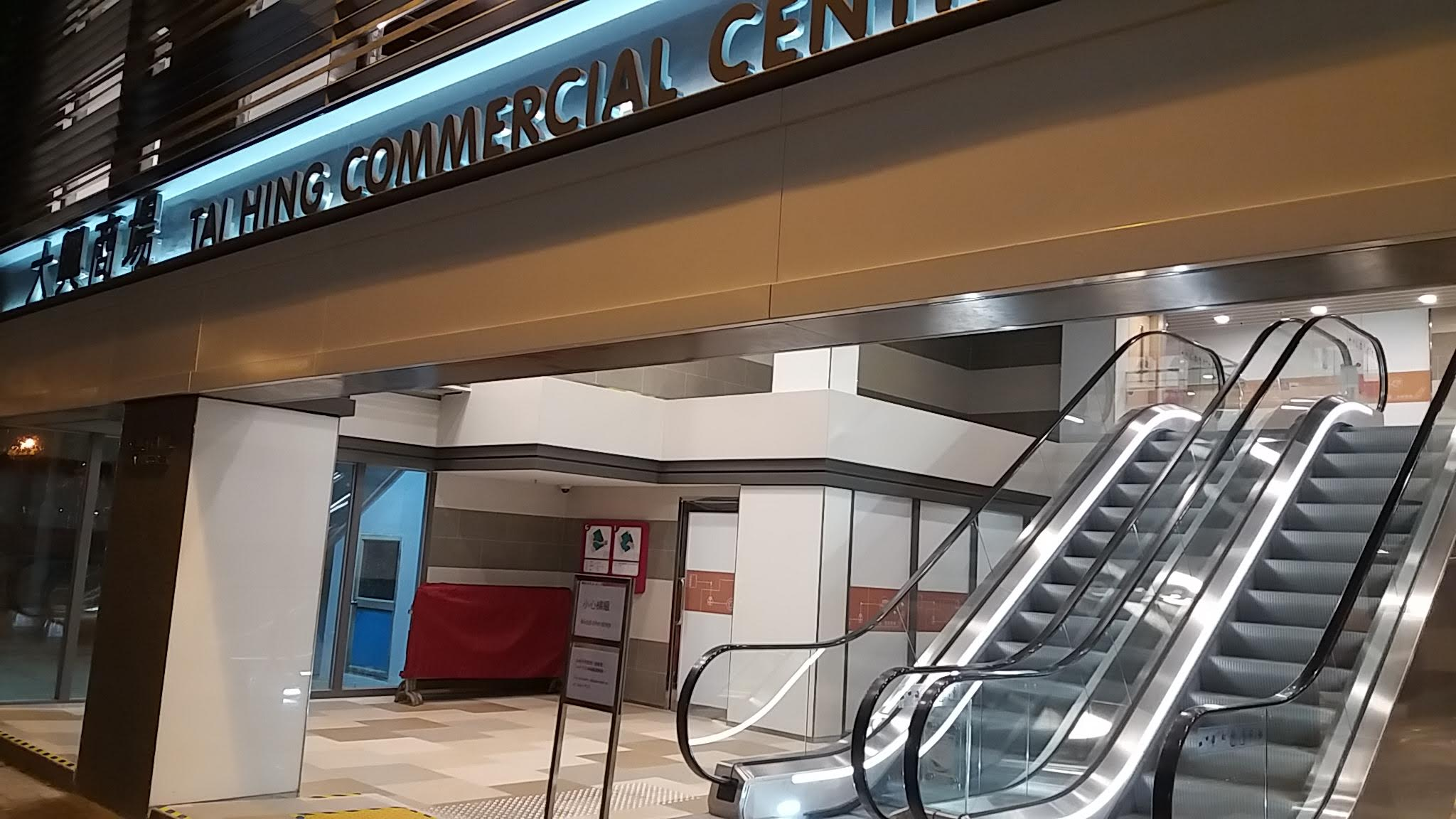
Tai Hing Commercial Centre

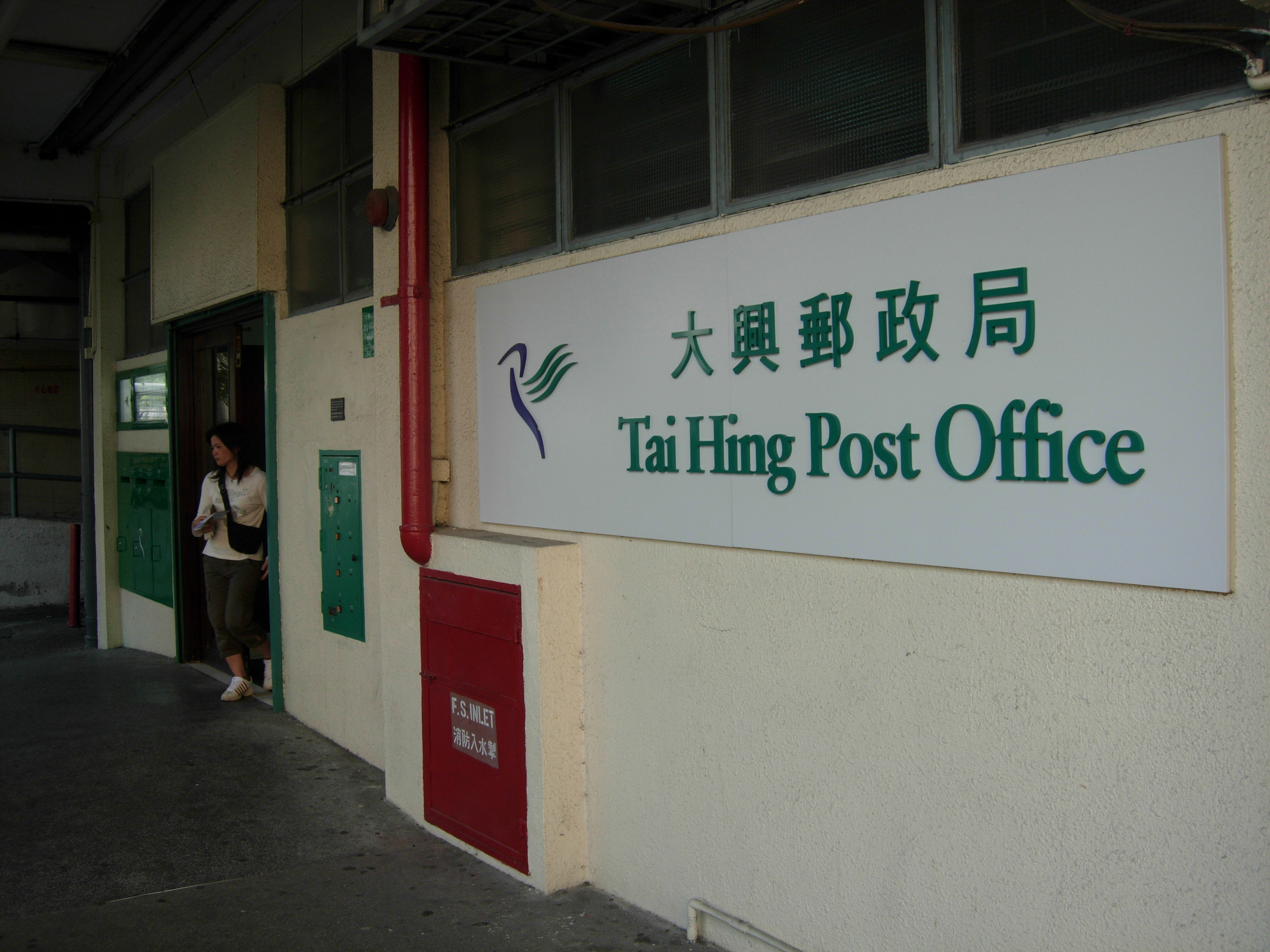
Tai Hing Post Office

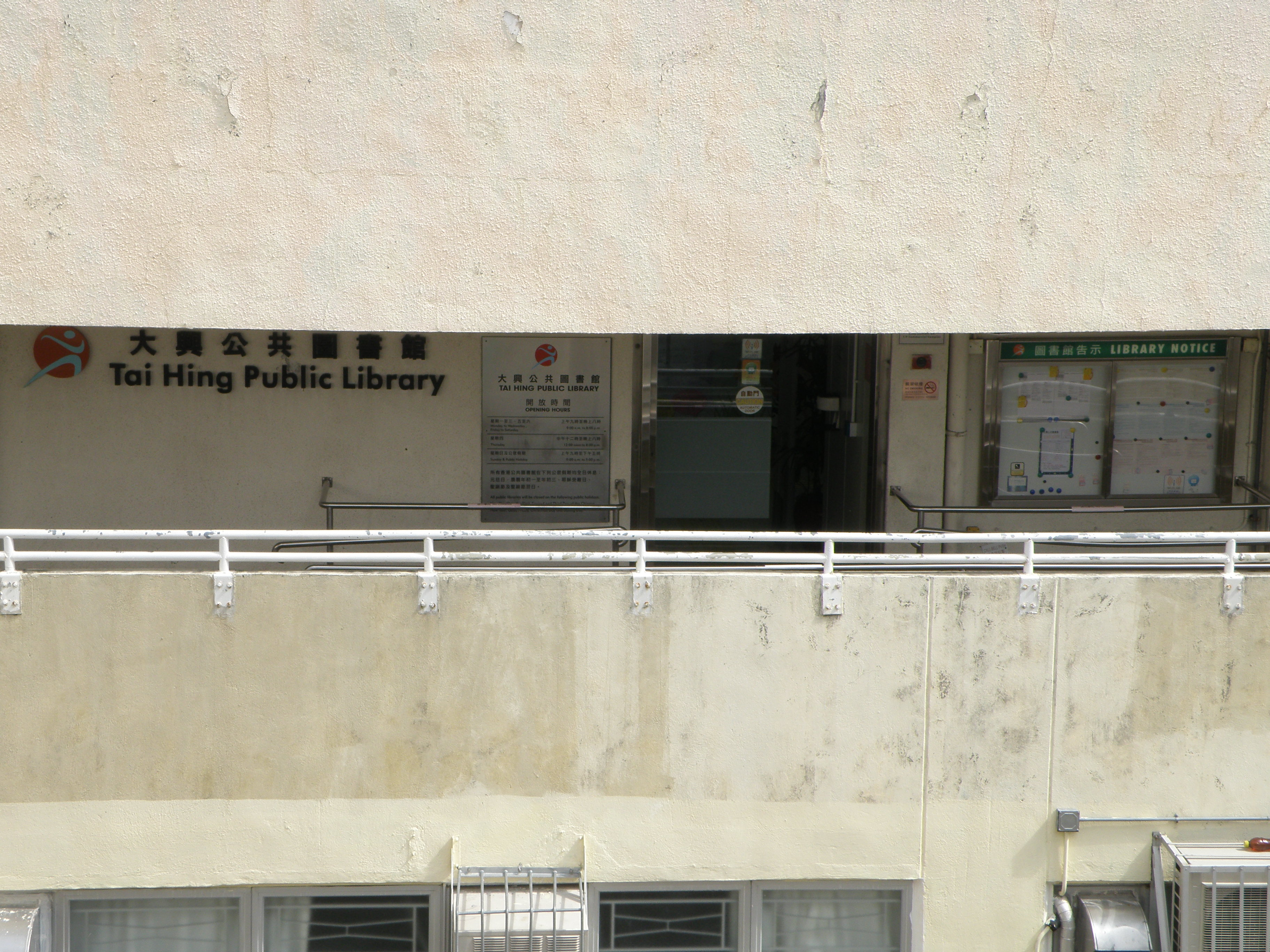
Tai Hing Public Library

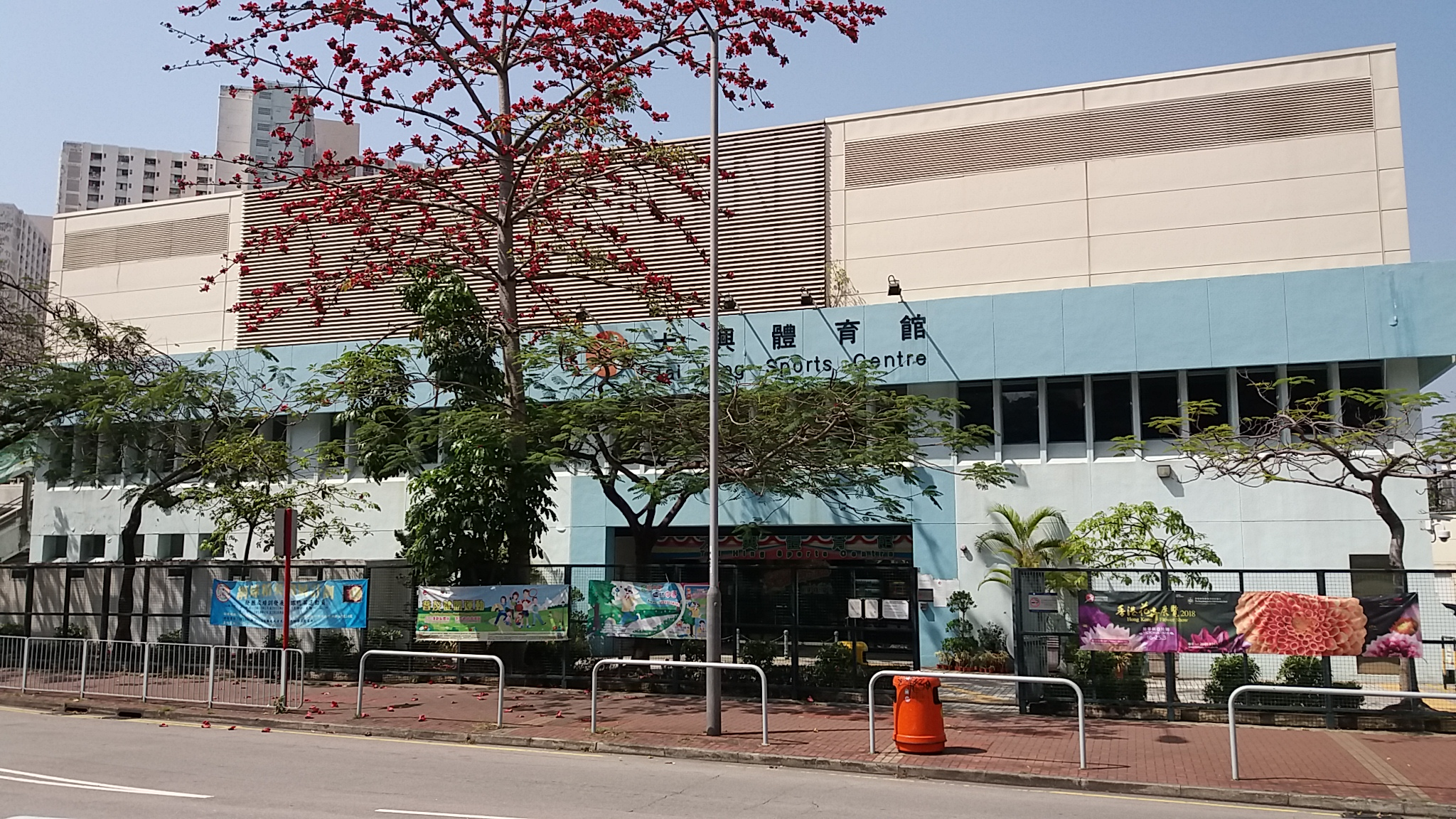
Tai Hing Sports Centre

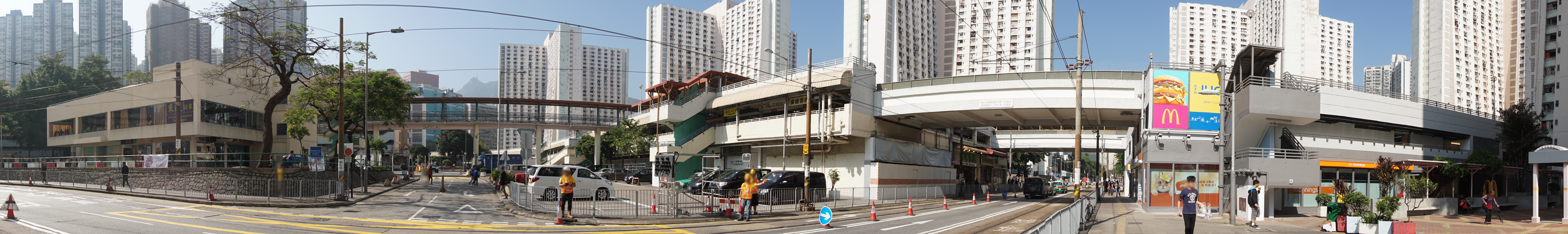
Panorama of Tai Hing Commercial Centre

== Transport ==
There are two MTR Light Rail stations in Tai Hing, they are Tai Hing (North) stop and Tai Hing (South) stop. Both belong to Zone 2 for single-ride journeys.

Tai Hing (North) (大興北) serves the northwestern part of the Tai Hing Estate
Tai Hing (South) (大興南) serves the southeastern part of the estate.

There is an emergency platform on the reverse loop at Tai Hing North Station. A westbound Light Rail Vehicle can become an eastbound one via the loop and the emergency platform.

== Houses ==
Name	Type	Completion	Floors	Units per floor	Units
Hing Cheung House	Cruciform	1977	30	48	1,392
Hing Shing House	Cruciform	1977	30	48	1,392
Hing Tai House	Cruciform	1977	30	48	1,392
Hing Yiu House	Cruciform	1979	30	48	1,392
Hing Fai House	Cruciform	1979	30	48	1,392
Hing Ping House	Cruciform	1979	30	48	1,392
Hing Wai House	Old Slab	1980	7	47	289

== Covid pandemic ==
Hing Ping House at the estate was placed under lockdown between 2 & 4 February, 2022.
