= THN =

THN may refer to:

- Tai Hing (North) stop, Hong Kong
- The Hockey News, magazine
- Tetrahydronaphthalene, chemical
- Terre Haute North Vigo High School, school
- Trollhättan–Vänersborg Airport, Sweden
