= CYB =

CYB may refer to:

- Charles Kirkconnell International Airport, Cayman Islands, IATA code
- Choy Yee Bridge stop, Hong Kong, MTR station code
