= TMU =

TMU can refer to:

== Universities ==
- Toronto Metropolitan University, Canada
- Taipei Medical University, Taiwan
- Tarbiat Modares University, Tehran, Iran
- Teerthanker Mahaveer University, Moradabad, India
- The Master's University, in Santa Clarita, California
- Tianjin Medical University, China
- Tokyo Metropolitan University, Japan
- Truett McConnell University, Baptist university in Georgia, United States
- Texas Methodist University, a fictional university on the TV series Friday Night Lights

== Other ==
- Tambor Airport, in Costa Rica (IATA code TMU)
- Tetramethylurea, a chemical compound
- Texture mapping unit, used in computer graphics processing
- Time measurement unit (0.036 seconds), in predetermined motion time systems
- TrackMania United, a racing game
- Tuen Mun stop, in Hong Kong (MTR station code)
- TMU station, a subway station in Toronto, Canada
