= Tuen Mun station =

MTR station in the New Territories, Hong Kong

Tuen Mun 屯門
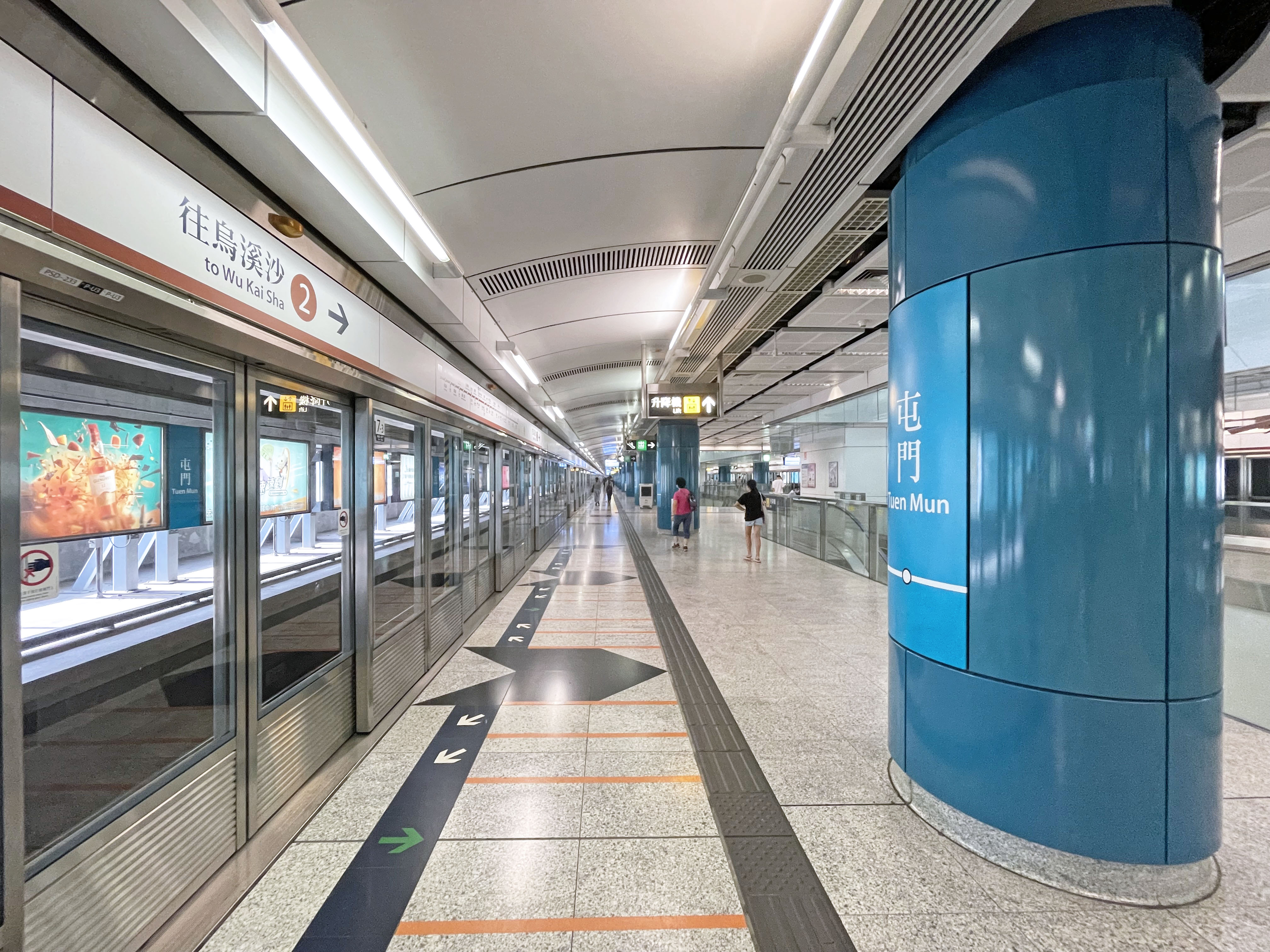
- Tuen Mun station platform

Chinese name
- Chinese: 屯門
- Cantonese Yale: Tyùnmùn
- Literal meaning: Garrison Gate
Transcriptions
Standard Mandarin
- Hanyu Pinyin: Túnmén
Yue: Cantonese
- Yale Romanization: Tyùnmùn
- Jyutping: Tyun4mun4

General information
- Location: Pui To Road × Tuen Mun River, Tuen Mun; Tuen Mun District, Hong Kong
- Coordinates: 22°23′43″N 113°58′23″E
- System: MTR rapid transit station
- Owner: KCR Corporation
- Operator: MTR Corporation
- Lines: Tuen Ma line; West Rail line (Until 27 June 2021)
- Platforms: 2 (1 island platform)
- Tracks: 2
- Connections: Tuen Mun stop: Routes: 505, 507, 751; Ho Tin stop: Routes: 507, 751; Bus, minibus

Construction
- Structure type: Elevated
- Platform levels: 1
- Accessible: Yes
- Architect: RMJM

Other information
- Status: Operational
- Station code: TUM

History
- Opened: 20 December 2003; 22 years ago

Services
Preceding station	MTR	Following station
Terminus	Tuen Ma line	Siu Hong towards Wu Kai Sha
Under Construction
A16 towards Tuen Mun South	Tuen Ma line	Siu Hong towards Wu Kai Sha
Preceding stop	MTR Light Rail	Following stop
Town Centre towards Sam Shing	505 transfer at Tuen Mun	Kin On towards Siu Hong
Town Centre towards Tuen Mun Ferry Pier	507 transfer at Tuen Mun	Ho Tin towards Tin King
Town Centre towards Yau Oi	751 transfer at Tuen Mun	Ho Tin towards Tin Yat
Track layout
Location
- Location within MTR

Tuen Mun is an MTR station located in Tuen Mun, New Territories, Hong Kong. It is the western terminus of the Tuen Ma line. The station is elevated over the Tuen Mun River, near the Town Park in the centre of Tuen Mun New Town.

Tuen Mun station is an interchange station with the Light Rail Tuen Mun stop and Ho Tin stop. A public transport interchange adjacent to the station gives passengers direct access to the station concourse via escalators and stairs.

== History ==
Tuen Mun station is adjacent to the former site of San Fat Estate, the first public housing estate in Tuen Mun, which was demolished in 2001 because of its age, and to provide a construction site for the station.

There is a plaque in the station concourse commemorating the topping out of the station. It was unveiled by the then-chairman and chief executive of KCR Corporation, K.Y. Yeung, on 14 November 2001. The station opened with the rest of the West Rail on 20 December 2003.

Three new station entrances were opened on 1 August 2013. Exits C3, D, and E opened to provide direct access from the station concourse to the newly opened V City shopping centre.

The West Rail line was extended to Hung Hom station in 2009, and as part of the Shatin to Central link project, the West Rail line was absorbed into the newly-extended Tuen Ma line in 2021. Tuen Mun station remained the terminus of the lengthened line.

== Station layout ==
U2; Platforms	Platform 2	Tuen Ma line towards Wu Kai Sha (Siu Hong) →
U2; Platforms	Island platform, doors will open on the left or right
U2; Platforms	Platform 1	Tuen Ma line towards Wu Kai Sha (Siu Hong) →
C/U1	Light Rail; Ho Tin stop	Exit F, Taxi Stand, drop-off area
C/U1	Concourse	Exit, customer services, toilets
C/U1	Concourse	MTRShops, vending machines, ATMs
C/U1	Light Rail; Tuen Mun stop	Exit B, Light Rail Tuen Mun stop, MTRShops
G	Light Rail; Ho Tin stop	Light Rail Ho Tin stop
G	Exit C	Exit C1, C2, public transport interchange
G	Light Rail; Tuen Mun stop	Passageway

Platforms 1 and 2 share the same island platform. Passengers can catch eastbound Tuen Ma line trains on either platform.

== Entrances/exits ==
- A: Pui To Road
- B: Light Rail - Tuen Mun
- C1: Pui To Road
- C2: Public Transport Interchange
- D, E: Century Gateway, V City
- F1: Taxi Stand
- F2: Light Rail - Ho Tin
