= NGW =

NGW may refer to:

- New Generation Wrestling, a wrestling promotion based in Hull, United Kingdom
- Nat Geo Wild, a TV channel focused on animal-related programming, sister network to the National Geographic Channel
- Ngan Wai stop, Hong Kong, MTR station code
