= Tai Hing (South) stop =

Light rail stop in Hong Kong

Coordinates: 22°24′10″N 113°58′19″E

Tai Hing (South) 大興 (南)
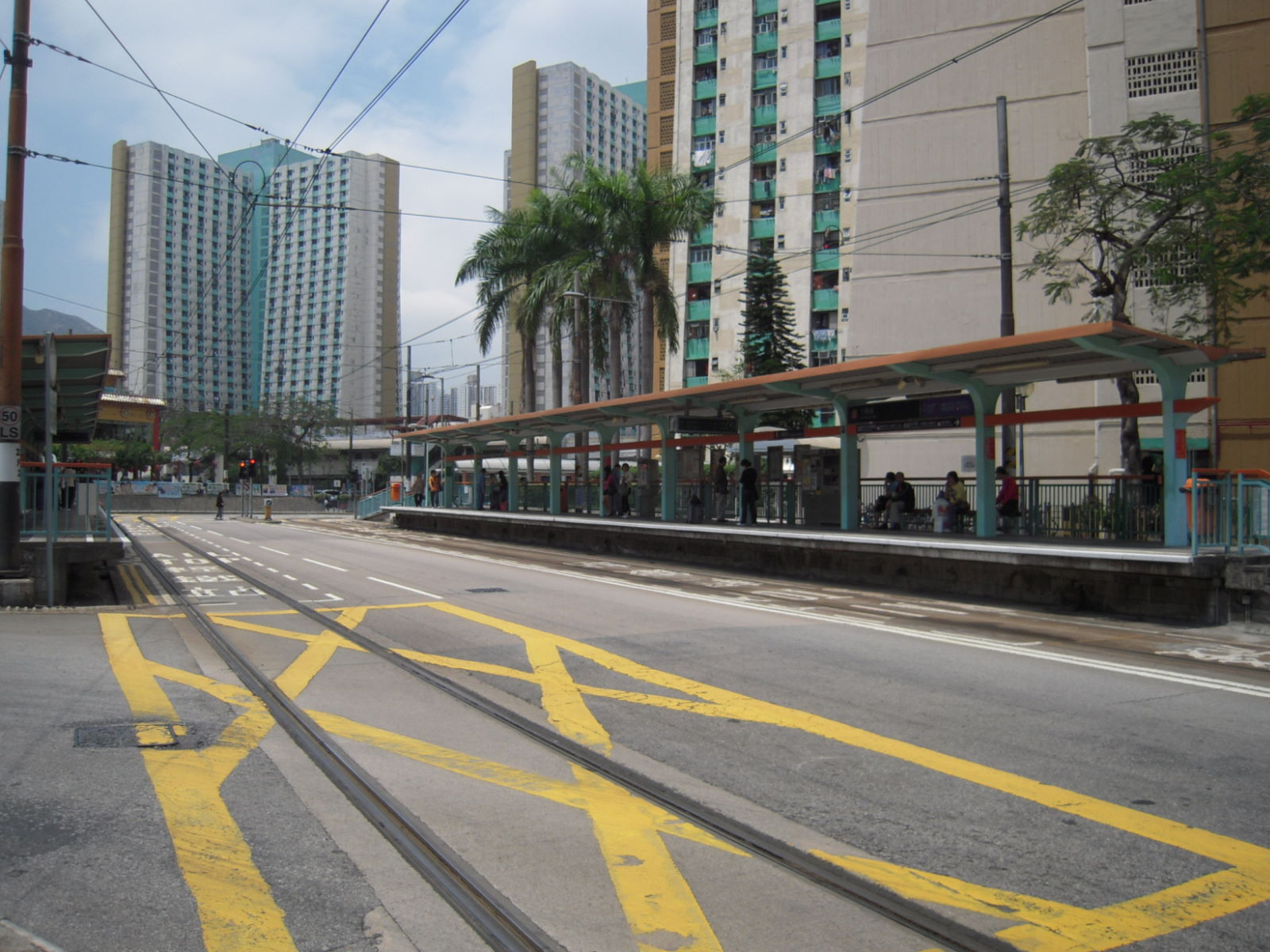
- Appearance of Tai Hing (South) stop

General information
- Location: Tai Hing Estate; Tuen Mun District; Hong Kong
- System: MTR Light Rail stop
- Owner: KCR Corporation
- Operator: MTR Corporation
- Line: 507 610
- Platforms: 2 side platforms
- Tracks: 2 (street running tracks, one built as contraflow lane)
- Connections: Bus, minibus

Construction
- Structure type: At-grade
- Accessible: yes

Other information
- Station code: THS (English code); 220 (Digital code)
- Fare zone: 2

History
- Opened: 18 September 1988; 37 years ago

Services
| Preceding stop | MTR Light Rail | Following stop |
|---|---|---|
| Tai Hing (North) towards Tin King | 507 | Ngan Wai towards Tuen Mun Ferry Pier |
| Tai Hing (North) towards Tuen Mun Ferry Pier | 610 | Ngan Wai towards Yuen Long |
Location
- Location within MTR

Tai Hing (South) (Chinese: 大興 (南)) is an at-grade MTR Light Rail stop located at Tai Fong Street near Tai Hing Commercial Centre, Tai Hing Estate, in Tuen Mun District. It began service on 18 September 1988 and belongs to Zone 2. It serves the south of Tai Hing Estate.
