= Tuen Mun stop =

LRT Station in the New Territories, Hong Kong

Tuen Mun 屯門
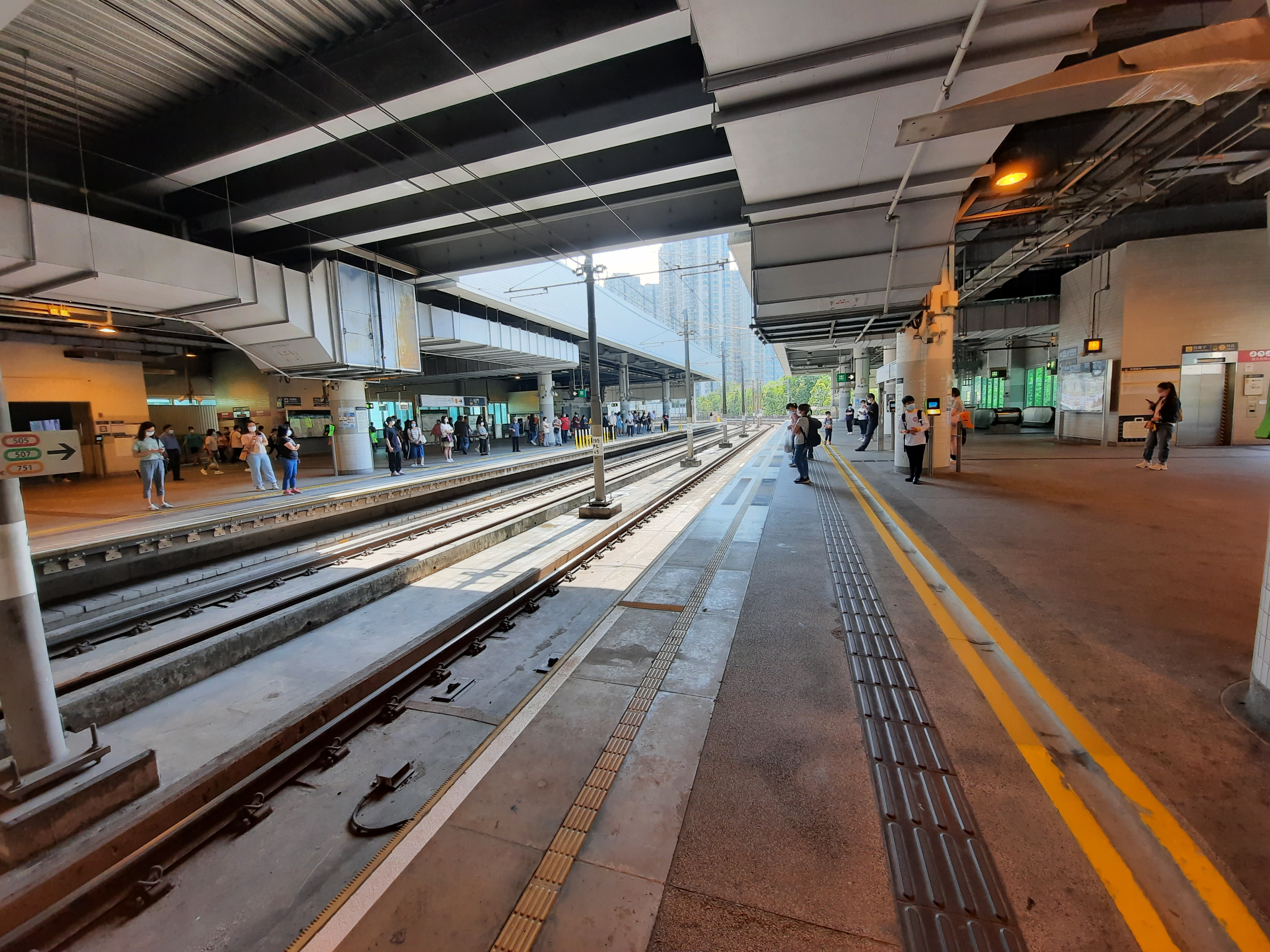
- Tuen Mun stop platform

General information
- Location: Tuen Mun; Tuen Mun District, Hong Kong
- Coordinates: 22°23′38″N 113°58′23″E
- System: MTR Light Rail stop
- Owner: KCR Corporation
- Operator: MTR Corporation
- Line: 505 507 751
- Platforms: 2 (2 side platforms)
- Tracks: 2
- Connections: Tuen Ma line (Tuen Mun); Bus, minibus

Construction
- Structure type: Elevated
- Accessible: yes

Other information
- Station code: TMU (English code); 295 (Digital code)
- Fare zone: 2

History
- Opened: 18 September 1988; 37 years ago (San Fat stop); 1 August 2003; 23 years ago (Tuen Mun stop)
- Former names: San Fat

Services
Preceding stop	MTR Light Rail	Following stop
Town Centre towards Sam Shing	505	Kin On towards Siu Hong
Ho Tin towards Tin King	507	Town Centre towards Tuen Mun Ferry Pier
Town Centre towards Yau Oi	751	Ho Tin towards Tin Yat
Preceding station	MTR	Following station
Terminus	Tuen Ma line transfer at Tuen Mun	Siu Hong towards Wu Kai Sha
Location
- Location within MTR

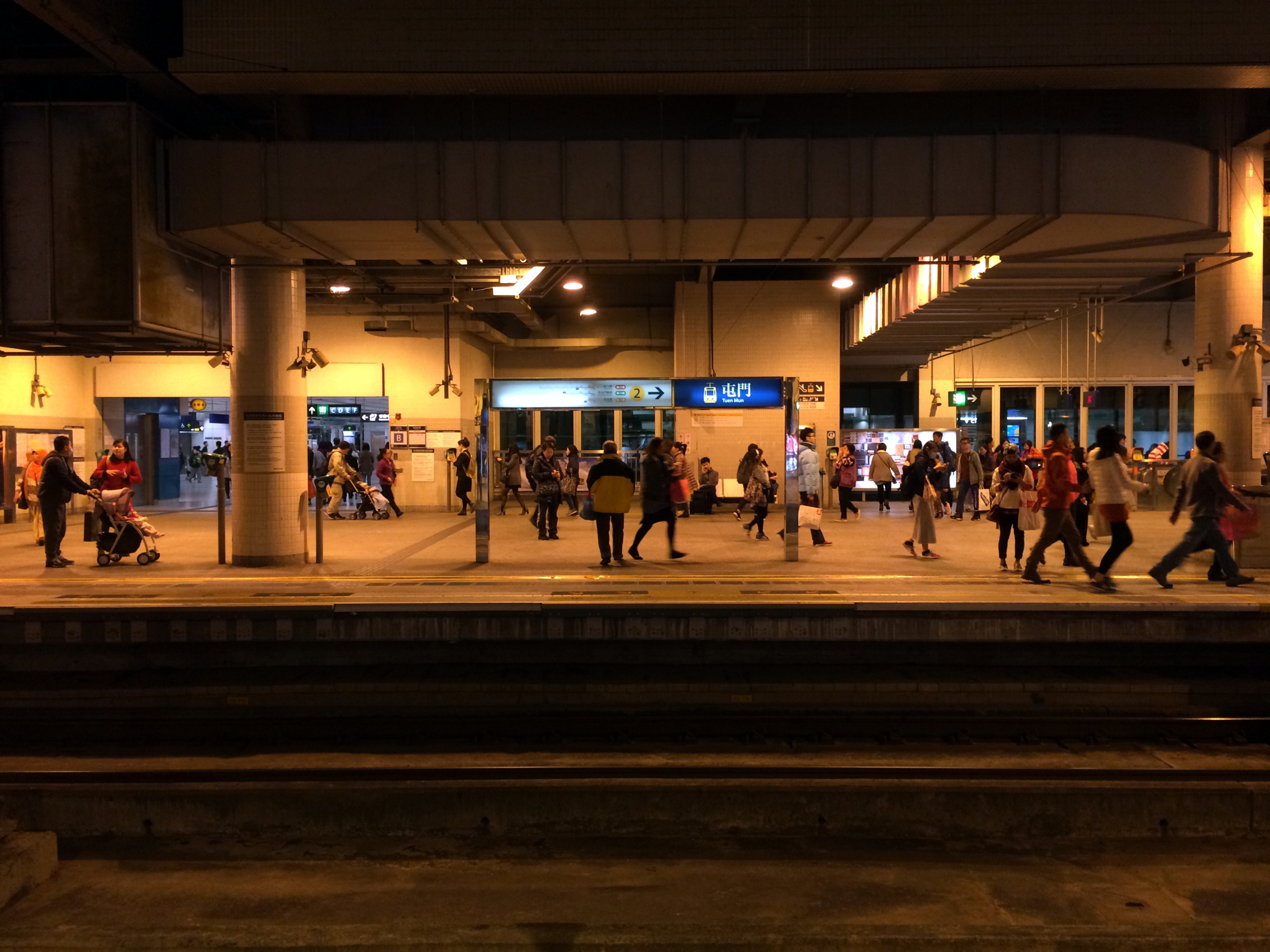
Light Rail Tuen Mun stop platforms

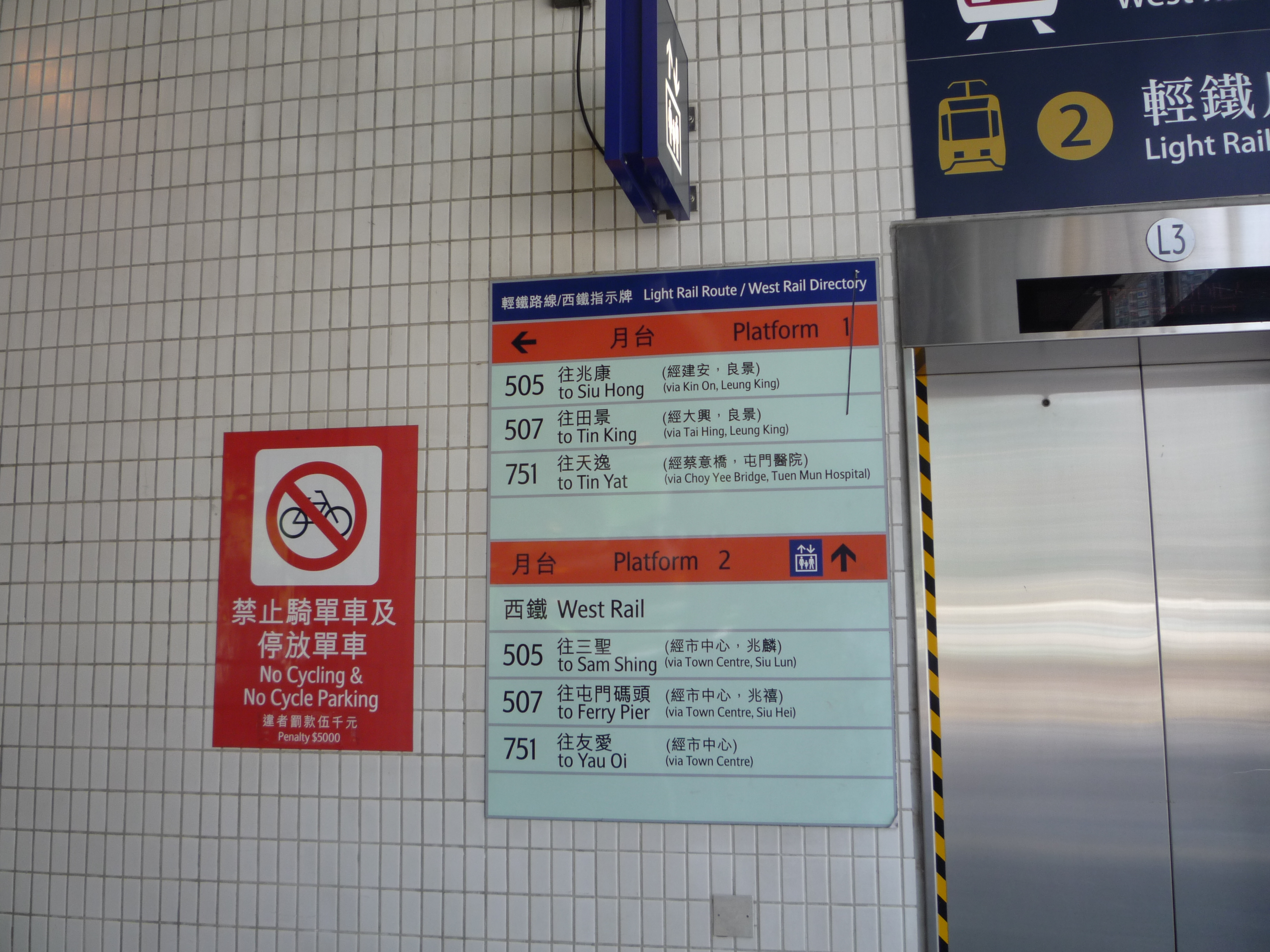
The signage and lift in Light Rail Tuen Mun stop

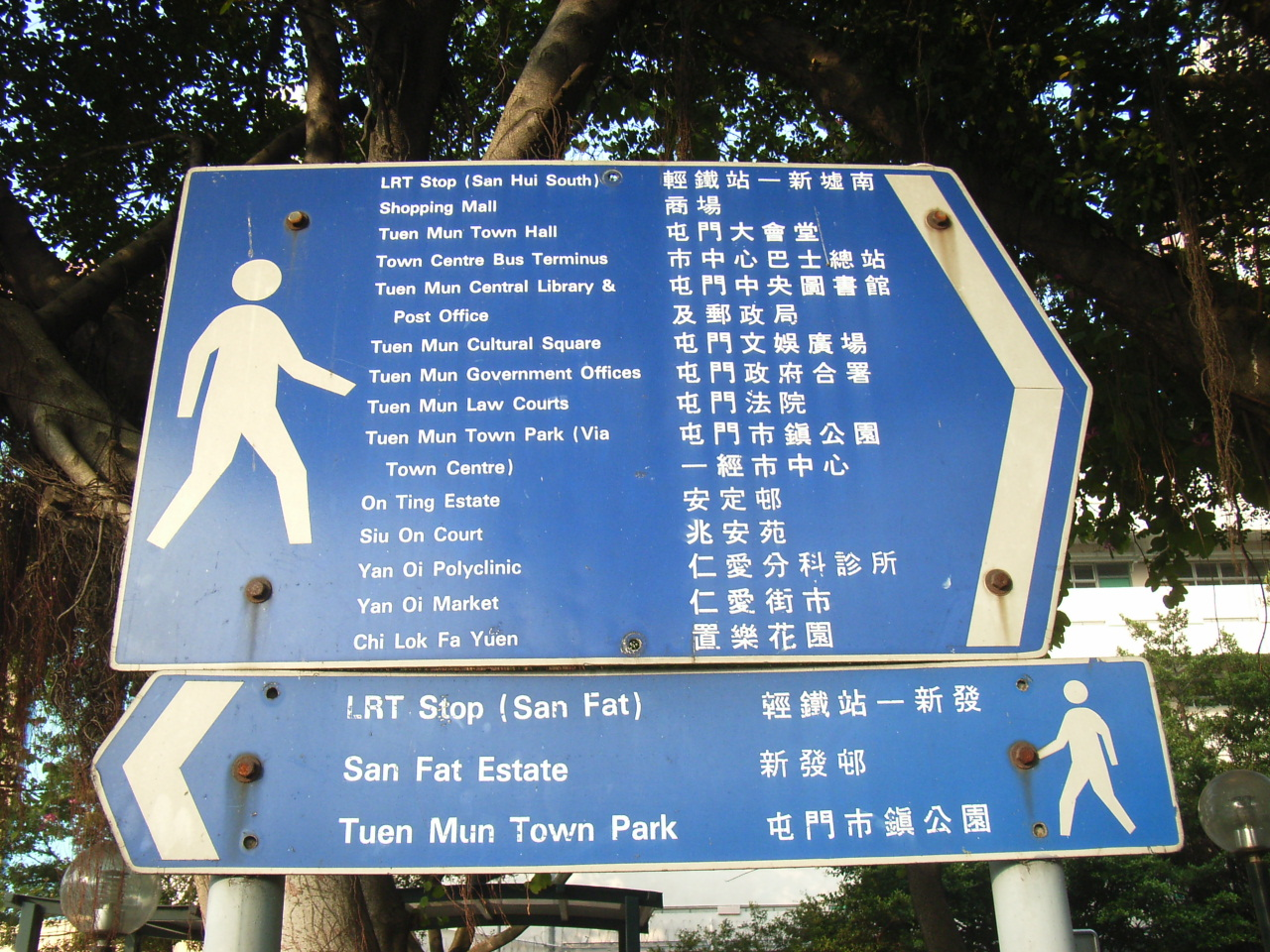
Signage showing the old name of the Light Rail Tuen Mun stop, San Fat stop

Tuen Mun (Chinese: 屯門) is an MTR Light Rail stop which belongs to zone 2. There are two platforms in Tuen Mun stop. This Light Rail stop is located above Pui To Road and Ho Pong Street and in the north of Tuen Mun Park. It provides service for nearby residents and is an interchange station for the Tuen Ma line, formerly known as the West Rail line.

== History ==
On 18 September 1988, the stop was opened as San Fat stop below the site of the current Tuen Mun stop, at ground level. It was named after the San Fat Estate.

On 1 August 2003, San Fat stop was renamed Tuen Mun stop (in preparation for the opening of the West Rail line Tuen Mun station later that year). At that time, the at-grade platforms were still used.

On 30 August the same year, the elevated platforms officially commenced service, although some Light Rail vehicles had been using the westbound platform from one week before.

== Station layout ==
L LRT Platform	Side platform, doors will open on the left
L LRT Platform	Platform 1	505 towards Siu Hong
L LRT Platform	Platform 1	507 towards Tin King
L LRT Platform	Platform 1	751 towards Tin Yat
L LRT Platform	Platform 2	505 towards Sam Shing
L LRT Platform	Platform 2	507 towards Tuen Mun Ferry Pier
L LRT Platform	Platform 2	751 towards Yau Oi
L LRT Platform	Side platform, doors will open on the left
L LRT Platform	Tuen Mun station concourse
G Ground	Passageway	Passageway to Light Rail platforms and West Rail line station concourse
G Ground	Exit	Pui To Road
