= Tuen Mun =

Area in the New Territories, Hong Kong

Coordinates: 22.391°N 113.973°E

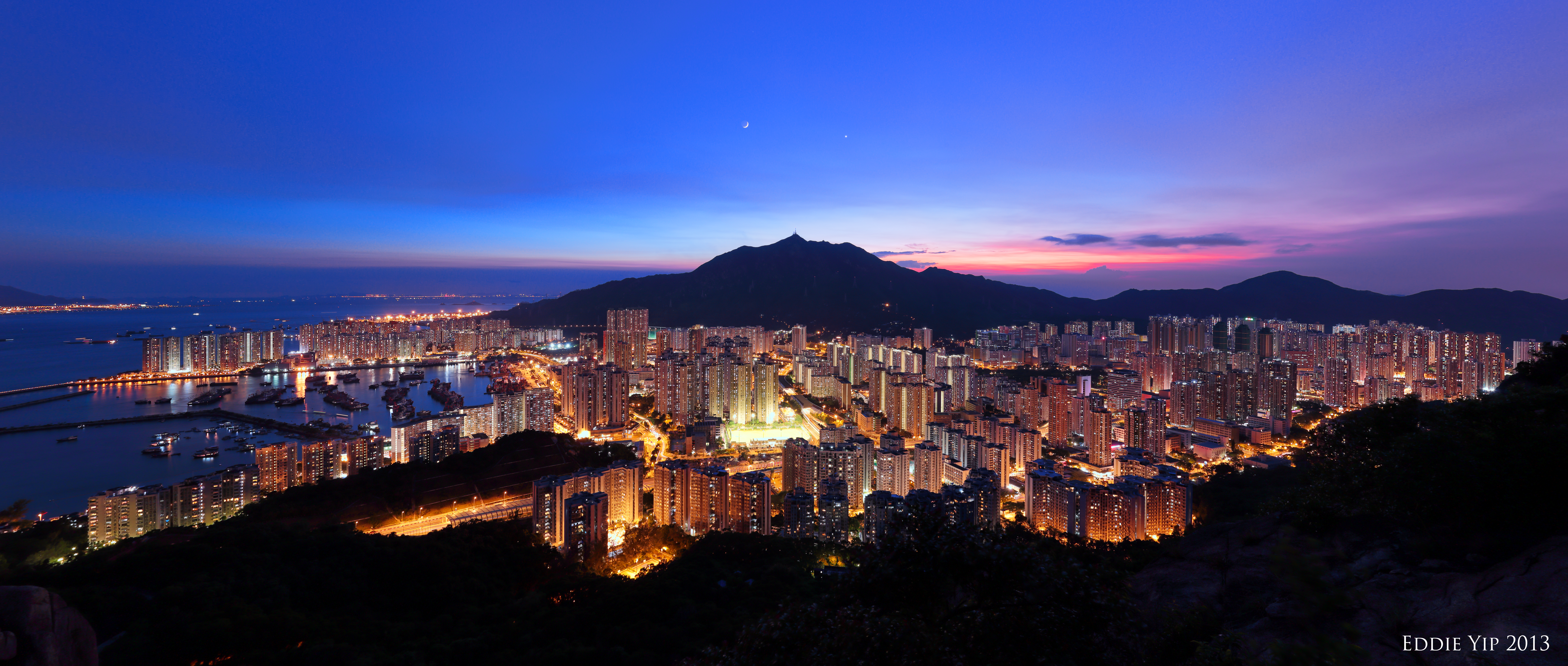
- Tuen Mun
- Traditional Chinese: 屯門
- Simplified Chinese: 屯门
- Cantonese Yale: Tyùhn mùhn
- Literal meaning: Garrison Gate
Transcriptions
Standard Mandarin
- Hanyu Pinyin: tún mén
Yue: Cantonese
- Yale Romanization: Tyùhn mùhn
- Jyutping: Tyun4 mun4
- IPA: [tʰy̏ːn mȕːn]

Tuen Mun (Chinese: 屯門; Jyutping: tyun4 mun4) or Castle Peak is an area near the mouth of Tuen Mun River and Castle Peak Bay in the west of New Territories, Hong Kong. It was one of the earliest settlements in what is now Hong Kong and can be dated to the Neolithic period. In the more recent past, it was home to many Tanka fishermen who gathered at Castle Peak Bay. Tuen Mun is now a modern, mainly residential area in the north-west New Territories. As of 2025, around 540,000 residents live in Tuen Mun.

== History ==
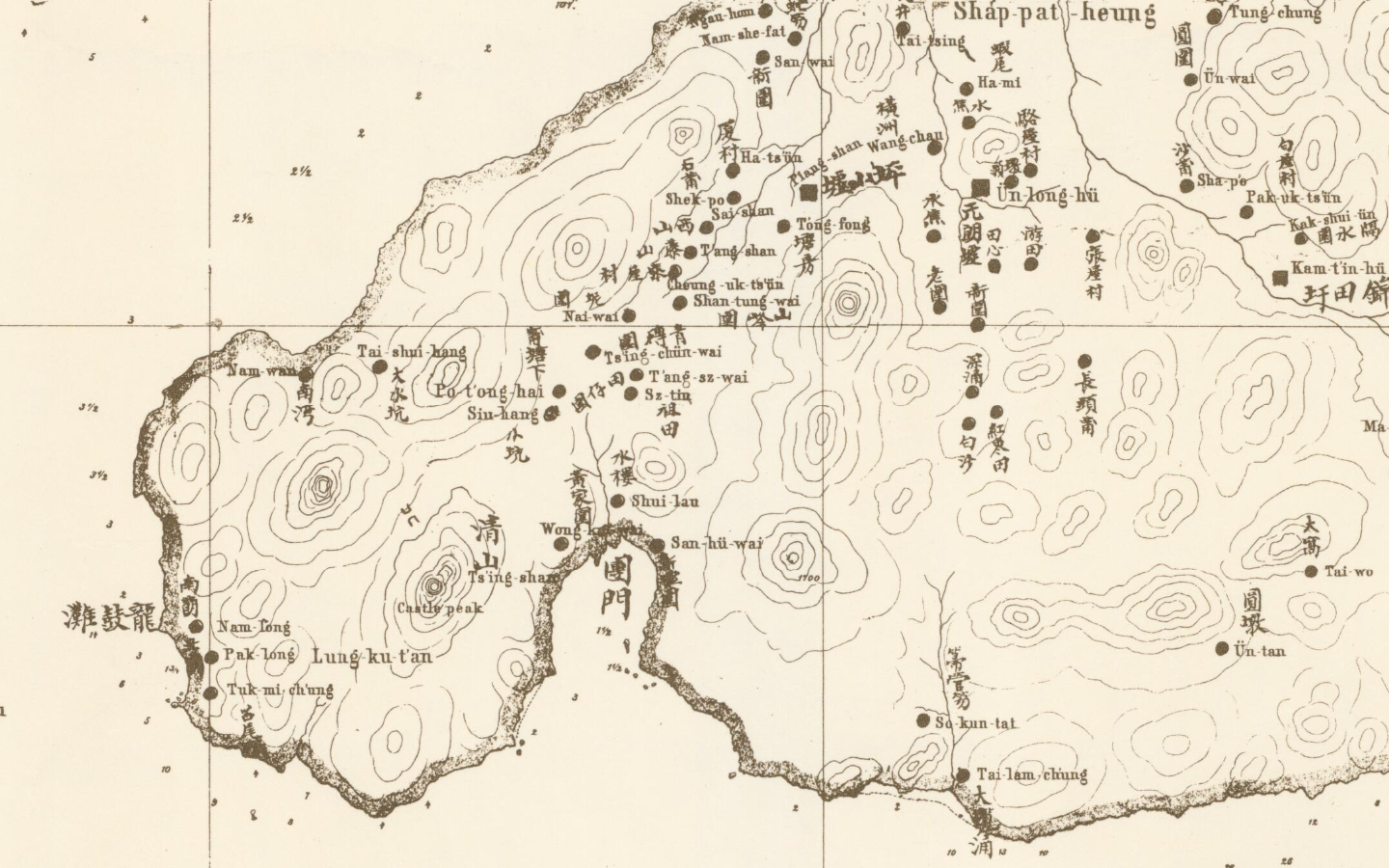
Detail of the 1866 "Map of the San-On District" showing Tuen Mun.

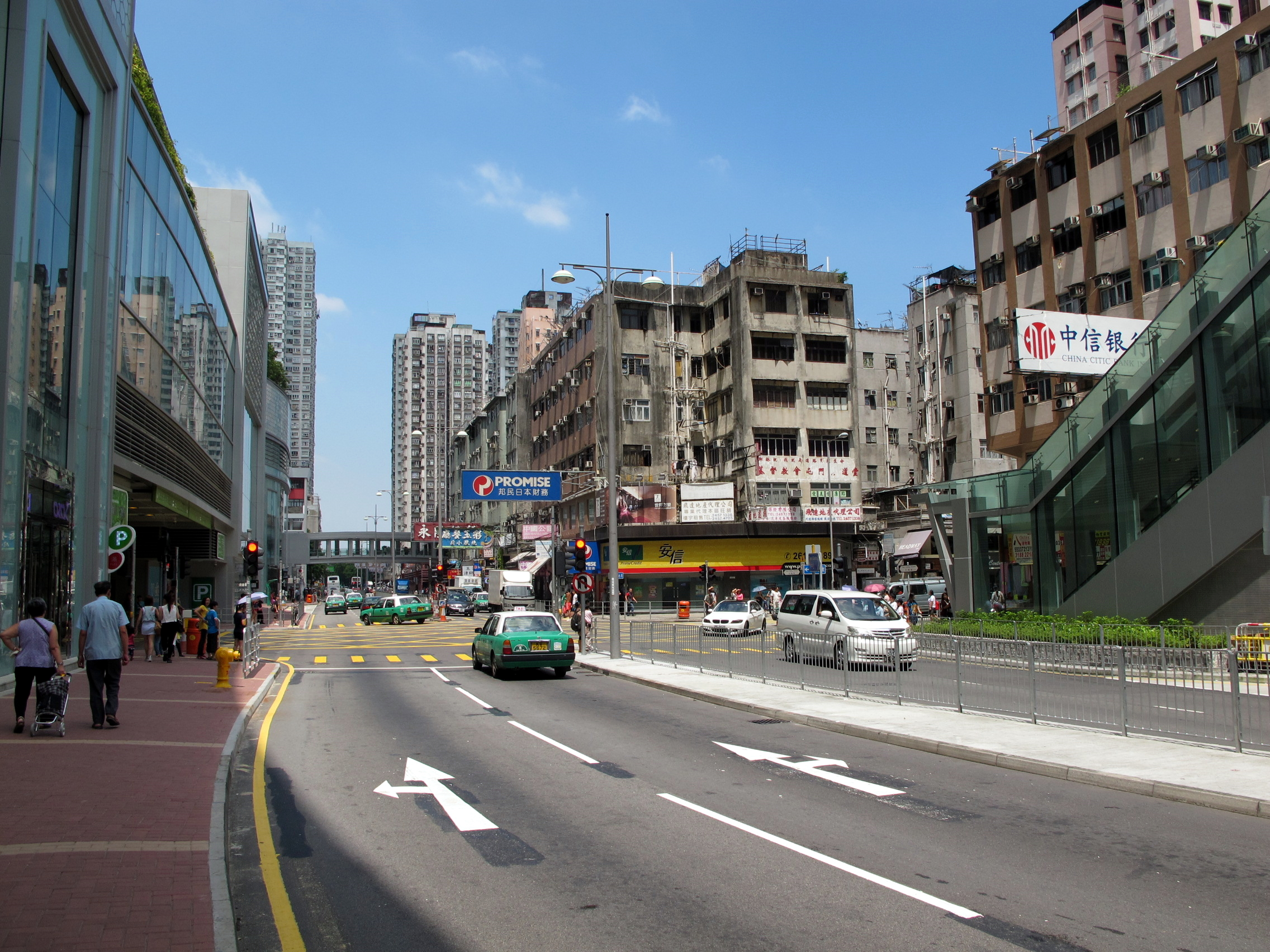
Old buildings in San Hui

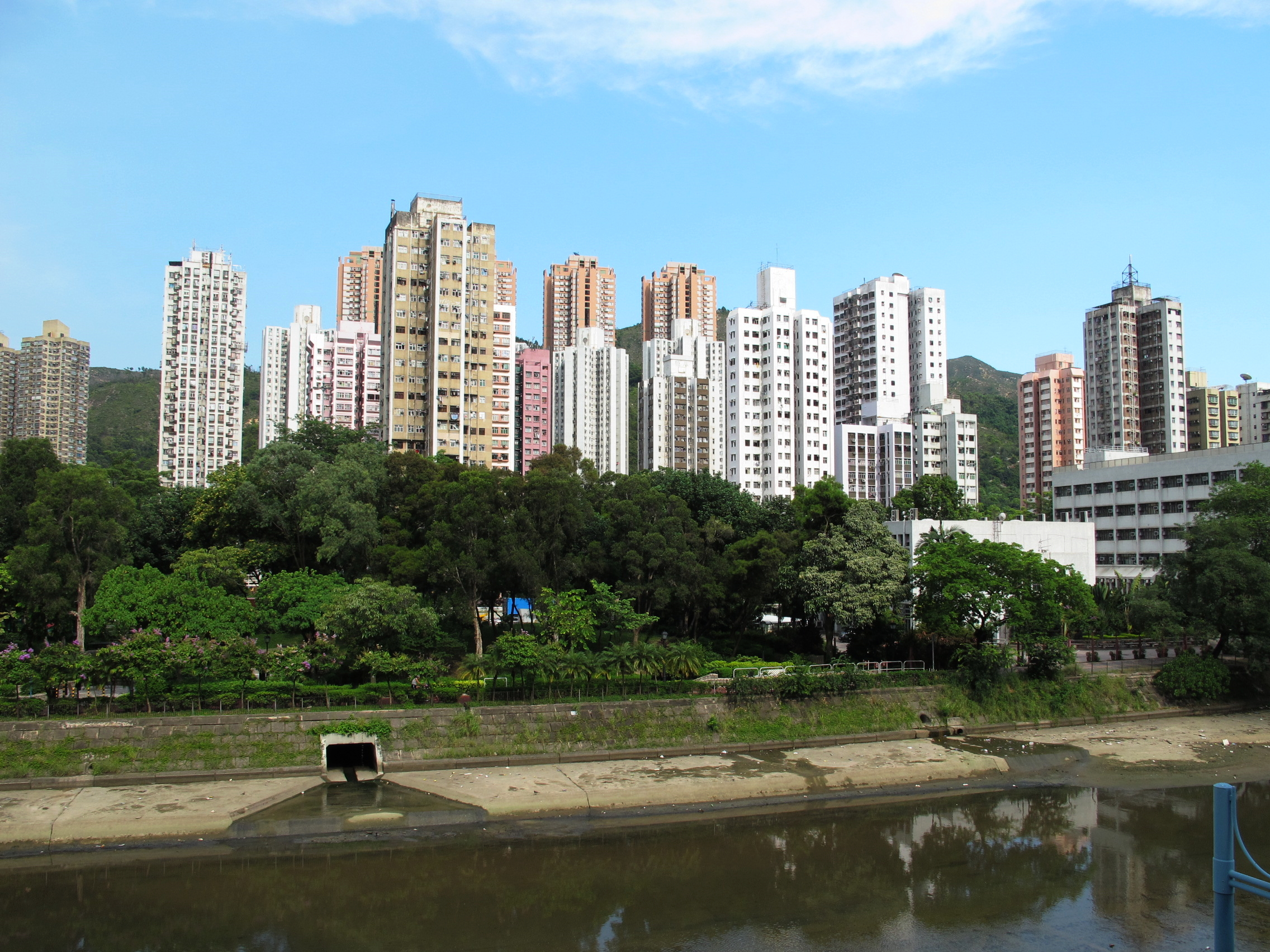
Residence in Red Bridge

During the Tang dynasty (618–907), a navy town, Tuen Mun Tsan (屯門鎮) was established in Nantou, which lies across Deep Bay. Tuen Mun and the rest of Hong Kong were under its protection.

A major clan, To (陶), brought the name Tuen Mun to the area. They migrated from Jiangxi from mainland China and established a village, Tuen Mun Tsuen (屯門村), late in the Yuan dynasty (1272–1368). As more and more villages were established, the village was renamed Tuen Mun Tai Tsuen (屯門大村), which means "large village" in Chinese. As yet more villages were established, a market town of Tuen Mun Hui (屯門墟) was established. This town lies where present-day Tuen Mun Kau Hui is situated, which name means "old market", as opposed to San Hui or "new market".

Tuen Mun remained an important town for coastal defence purposes until the start of British rule in 1898. When the British took over the New Territories from the Qing government in this year, the area was renamed Castle Peak, and Tuen Mun Hui to Castle Peak Market (青山墟) or Tsing Shan Hui. The name Tuen Mun, however, continued to be used by those living in the area.

In the more recent past, Tuen Mun was home to many Tanka fishermen who gathered at Castle Peak Bay.

In 1965, "Castle Peak New Town" was planned. It was later renamed Tuen Mun New Town and constructed from 1970 onwards with many buildings on the reclaimed land of the former Castle Peak Bay. The name was officially changed back to Tuen Mun in 1972. The first public housing estate built in the town was Castle Peak Estate, opened 1971.

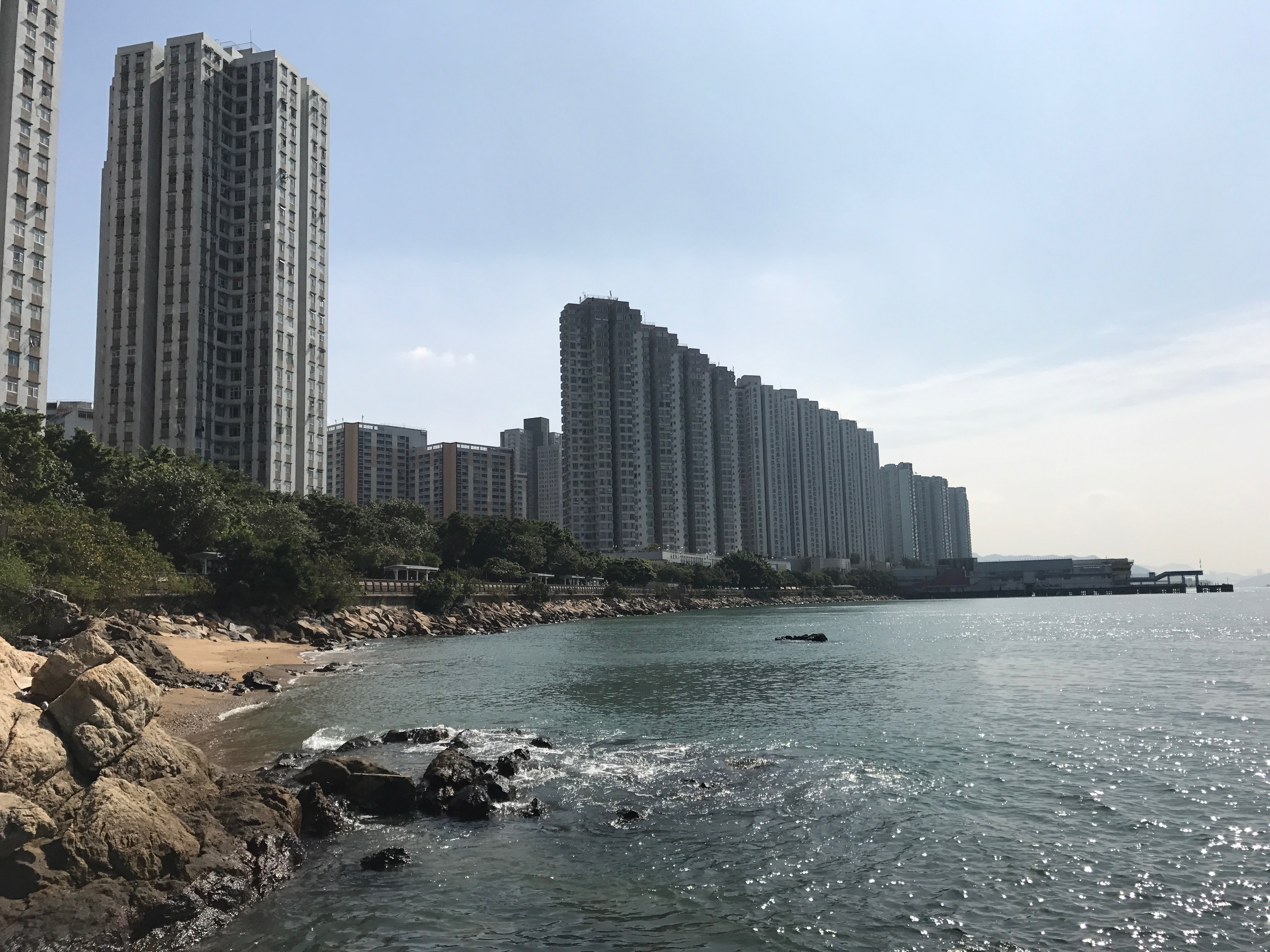
Butterfly Bay Park is the largest seaside park in NT.

As of 2024, serious hill fires have been reported in Tuen Mun.

== Geography ==
Tuen Mun is located in the west of Hong Kong's New Territories. It is sandwiched between two mountains, Castle Peak (583 m) from the west and Kau Keng Shan (507 m) from the east.

Tuen Mun Trail contains 2 segments. One starts from Hoh Fuk Tong College in San Hui connected with the end of MacLehose Trail through to Yeuk Mung Yuen (若夢園) till Prime View Garden. Another starts from "Yeuk Mung Yuen" to Fu Tei. It opens up the hills flanking the town, seeing the broad view of picturesque Tuen Mun from the lookout points.

== Facilities ==
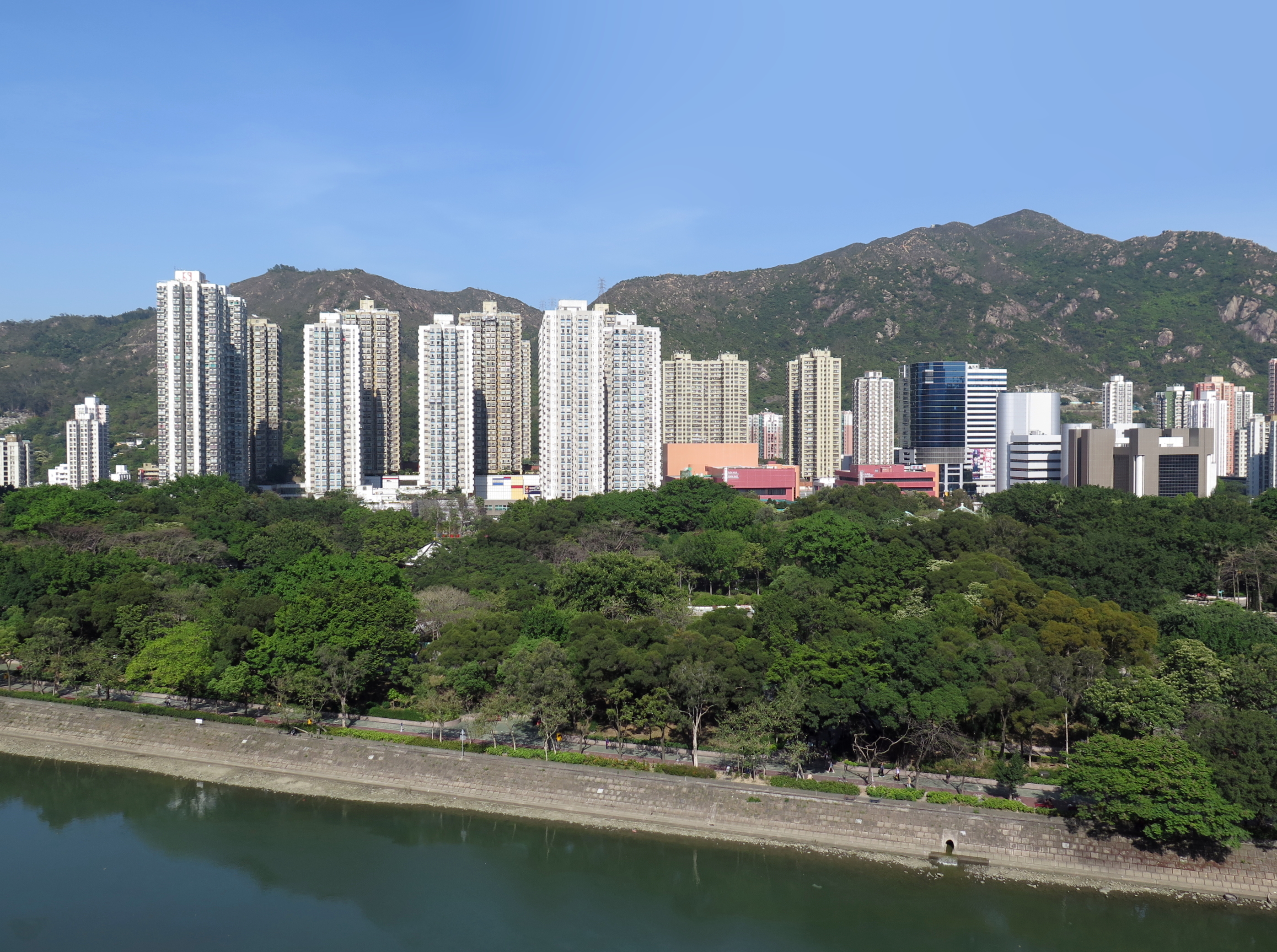
Tuen Mun Town Centre

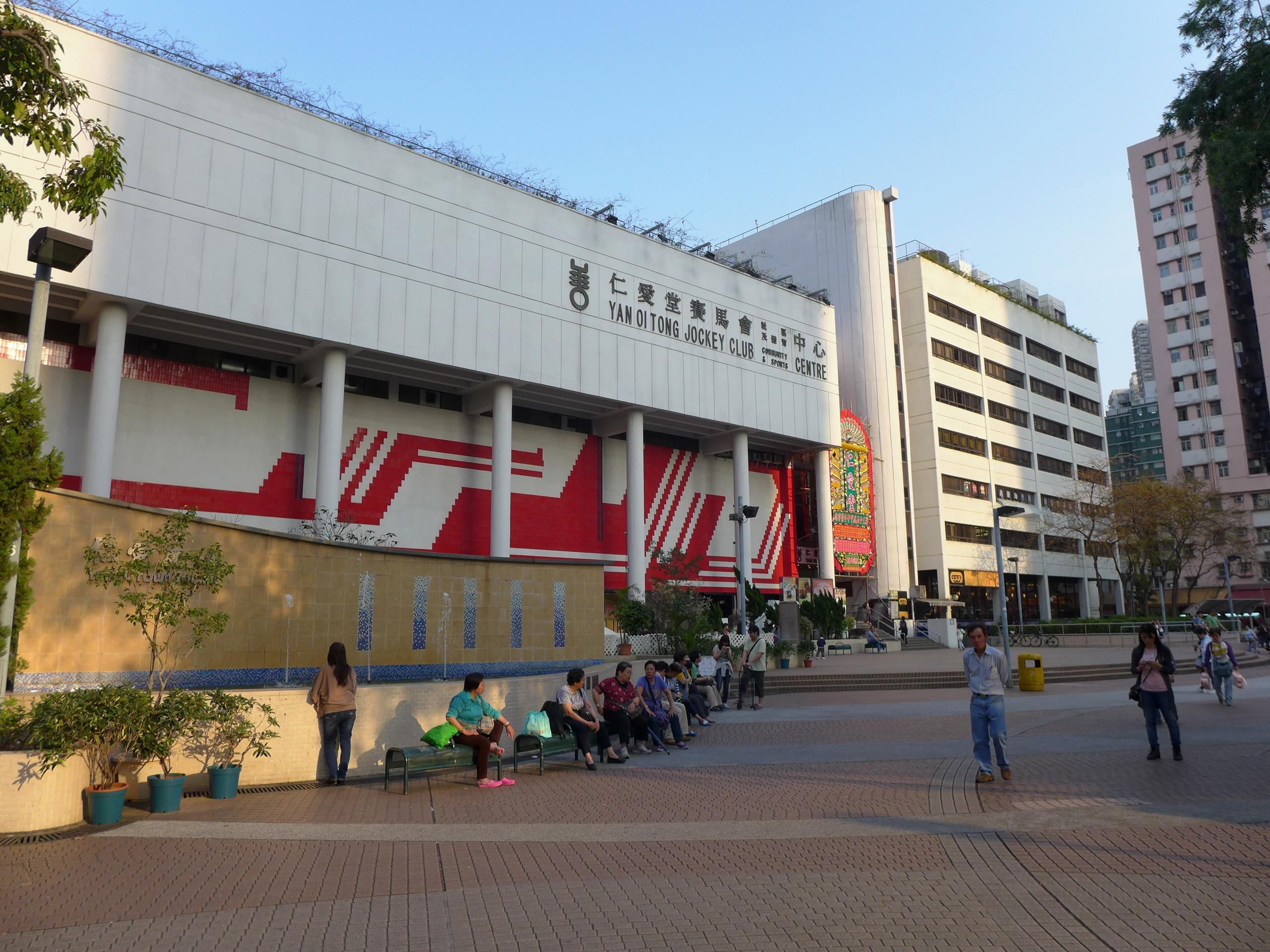
Yan Oi Tong Jockey Club Centre

There are three traditional-style markets in the town: Tuen Mun Kau Hui (屯門舊墟)‍, Tuen Mun San Hui (屯門新墟) and Sam Shing Hui (三聖墟).

There are many government facilities also, including the Tuen Mun Magistracy, and governmental offices. Leisure facilities include several sports complexes, a multi-story central library supplemented by two others, and a theatrical and concert venue in the form of the Tuen Mun Town Hall‍ at Tuen Mun Town Centre.

The Correctional Services Department operates the Tai Lam Centre for Women in the district. The Crossroads village, which operates a handicrafts market selling artisanal fair trade products from around the world, is based in Tuen Mun.

The Chek Lap Kok airport is across the locality.

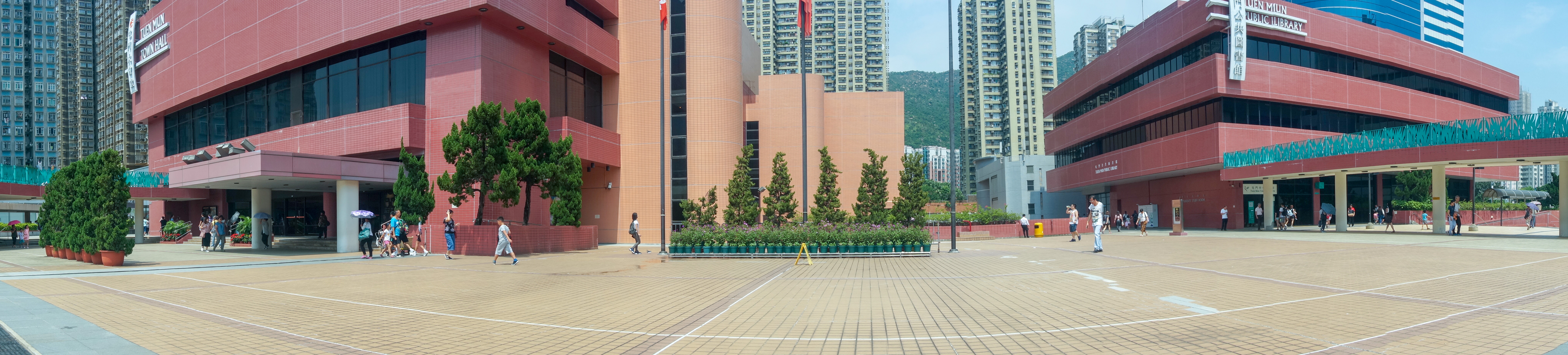
Tuen Mun Civic Square (Tuen Mun Cultural Square)

== Public utilities ==
Hong Kong's largest electricity generation facilities, the Castle Peak Power Station (Station A & B) and Black Point Power Station (Station C & D), are located in western Tuen Mun.

== Education ==
There are 36 primary and 38 secondary schools in Tuen Mun. There are three higher education institutions including Lingnan University, Hong Kong Institute of Vocational Education (IVE) and Chu Hai College of Higher Education.

Primary and secondary schools:

- Tuen Mun Catholic Secondary School
- Christian Alliance S.C. Chan Memorial College
- Harrow International School Hong Kong

Areas west of the Tuen Mun River Channel are in Primary One Admission (POA) School Net 70 while areas east of the channel are in POA School Net 71. Within school net 70 are multiple aided schools (operated independently but funded with government money) and the following government schools: Tuen Mun Government Primary School (屯門官立小學). POA 71 only consists of aided schools.

Hong Kong Public Libraries operates the following:

- Tuen Mun Public Library
- Tai Hing Public Library in Tai Hing Estate
- Butterfly Estate Public Library in Butterfly Estate

== Transport ==
=== Light Rail ===
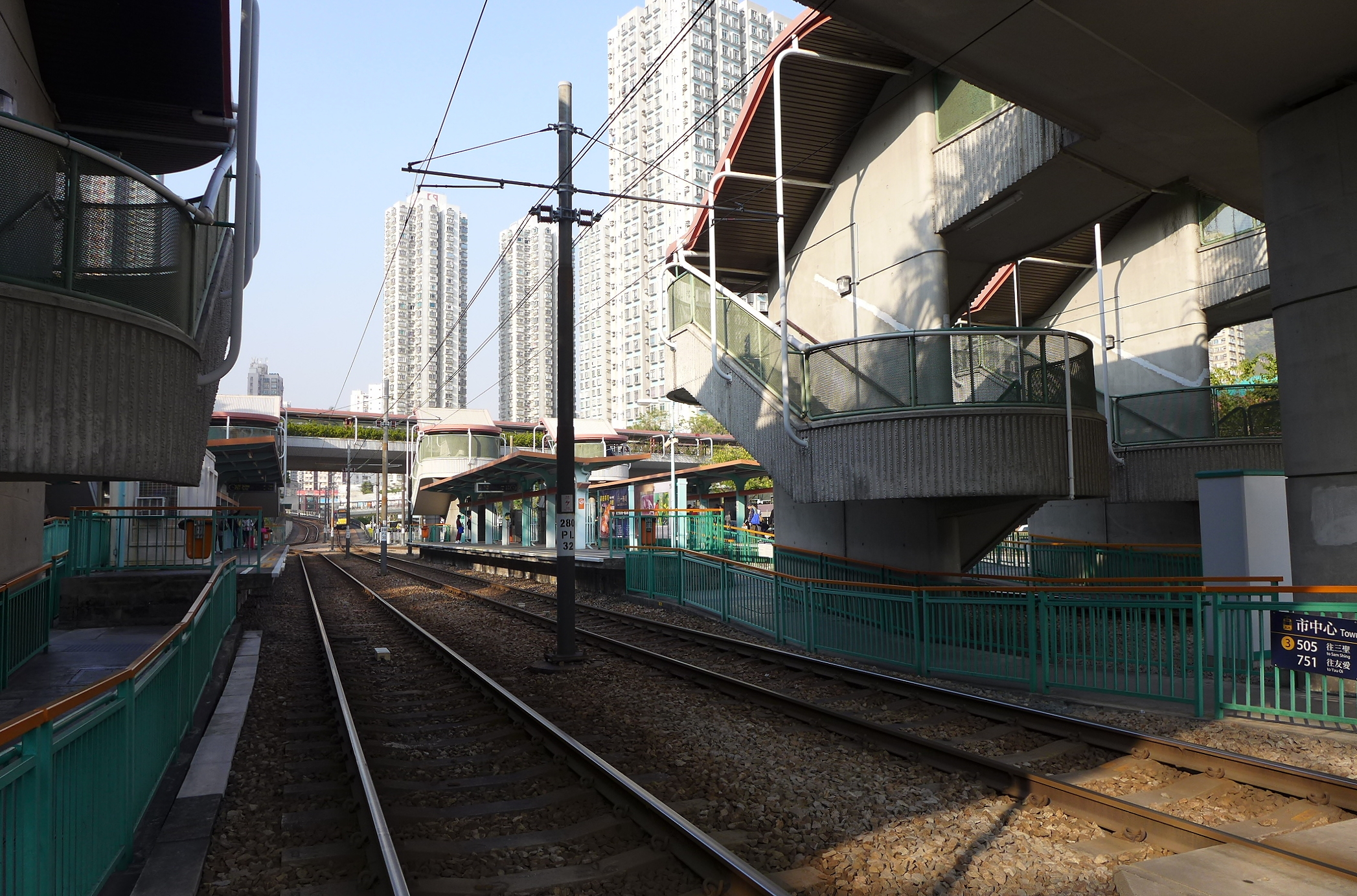
LRT Town Centre station

Tuen Mun is served extensively by zones 1–3 of the MTR Light Rail (zones 4, 5, 5a are in Yuen Long and Tin Shui Wai), the initial phase of which was completed and operational on 18 September 1988. The government decided that services between town centres and settlements would be provided solely by a Light Rail Transit (LRT) system, while feeder buses operated by the Kowloon-Canton Railway Corporation (now operated by MTR after the takeover in 2007) would connect remote sites to the network, replacing Kowloon Motor Bus's equivalent services where applicable. The North-west Railway, as it was then known, was thus established according to the Kowloon-Canton Railway Corporation Ordinance.

The system consisted of two big and three small loops serving most of the public housing estates in Tuen Mun. Three branches: one to On Ting Estate in the south, one to the Tuen Mun Ferry Pier in the southwest, and another northern branch all the way into the town of Yuen Long along Castle Peak Road.

=== MTR Tuen Ma Line ===
With the KCR West Rail opened in December 2003 (which had become part of the Tuen Ma line on 27 June 2021), the Light Rail have also taken the role of feeder services. Tuen Mun and Wu Kai Sha stations are the termini of Tuen Ma Line. The service had been enhanced from using 7-car trains to 8-car to cope with the increasing population in Tuen Mun, Tin Shui Wai, and Yuen Long. Since becoming part of Tuen Ma line, passengers taking the railway line can reach the Ma On Shan, Kai Tak, Tai Wai and Diamond Hill areas directly and conveniently.

=== Road ===
Tuen Mun is well-connected to different districts in Hong Kong and the border with mainland China.

Residents can take 952, 960, 961, and 962 series bus to the Hong Kong Island side. Meanwhile, LWB provides services between Tuen Mun and Hong Kong International Airport. KMB, the largest bus companies in HK, having route 57M, 58M, 58X, 59M, 59X, 60M, 60X, 61X, 63X, 53, 261, 263, 260X, 258D, 259D, 62X and more to bring passenger from Tuen Mun to various destinations in New Territories and Kowloon. Passengers can take A33, A33X, A34, E33, E33P, N30, and NA33 to the airport at day time, afternoon and mid-night.

The Hong Kong–Shenzhen Western Corridor, Cross Border Bus Services to Shekou is operated by Citybus on route B3, which departs from Tuen Mun Ferry Pier, B3X which departs from Tuen Mun Town Centre, a five minutes walk from MTR Tuen Mun station. And B3A which departs from Shan King Estate. Residents can also take Green Minibus service 44, 44A, 44B series to San Tin and Sheung Shui from Tuen Mun.

MTR Bus is available within the Tuen Mun District. Routes can reach most of the residential areas in Tuen Mun. K51, K52, K53, K54, and 506 serving from the early morning to late night. Passenger transferring to/from Light Rail (LRT) and Tuen Ma line could get a transit discount by using Octopus card to pay.

=== Ferry ===
The town is also served by New World First Ferry services to Tung Chung (being discontinued in July 2008 and replaced by Fortune Ferry Tuen Mun – Tung Chung – Sha Lo Wan – Tai O services). On 28 January 2016, TurboJET launched the new cross-boundary ferry services between Tuen Mun, Macau and Shenzhen Airport (being suspended services since 2019 due to the COVID-19 pandemic). All services departs from Tuen Mun Ferry Pier.

== Climate and air quality ==
Climate data for Tuen Mun (2007–2020)
Month	Jan	Feb	Mar	Apr	May	Jun	Jul	Aug	Sep	Oct	Nov	Dec	Year
Mean daily maximum °C (°F)	20.0 (68.0)	20.8 (69.4)	23.0 (73.4)	26.1 (79.0)	29.9 (85.8)	31.6 (88.9)	32.4 (90.3)	32.2 (90.0)	31.8 (89.2)	29.4 (84.9)	25.9 (78.6)	21.6 (70.9)	27.1 (80.7)
Daily mean °C (°F)	16.1 (61.0)	17.4 (63.3)	19.9 (67.8)	22.9 (73.2)	26.6 (79.9)	28.6 (83.5)	29.2 (84.6)	28.8 (83.8)	28.3 (82.9)	25.8 (78.4)	22.0 (71.6)	17.7 (63.9)	23.6 (74.5)
Mean daily minimum °C (°F)	13.3 (55.9)	14.8 (58.6)	17.5 (63.5)	20.5 (68.9)	24.2 (75.6)	26.2 (79.2)	26.6 (79.9)	26.3 (79.3)	25.7 (78.3)	23.2 (73.8)	19.3 (66.7)	14.8 (58.6)	21.0 (69.9)
Average precipitation mm (inches)	42.1 (1.66)	32.2 (1.27)	76.0 (2.99)	138.9 (5.47)	264.0 (10.39)	343.9 (13.54)	242.1 (9.53)	301.6 (11.87)	193.9 (7.63)	58.8 (2.31)	37.2 (1.46)	30.3 (1.19)	1,761 (69.31)
Average relative humidity (%)	68.5	73.3	76.4	77.4	79.8	80.5	77.9	79.7	75.3	69.1	68.5	63.6	74.2
Source: Hong Kong Observatory

As of 2025, bad air quality has been reported in Tuen Mun.

== See also ==
- Air pollution in Hong Kong
- Hong Kong Gold Coast
- Tamão
