= Ngan Wai stop =

Light rail stop in Hong Kong

Coordinates: 22°24′09″N 113°58′28″E

Ngan Wai 銀圍
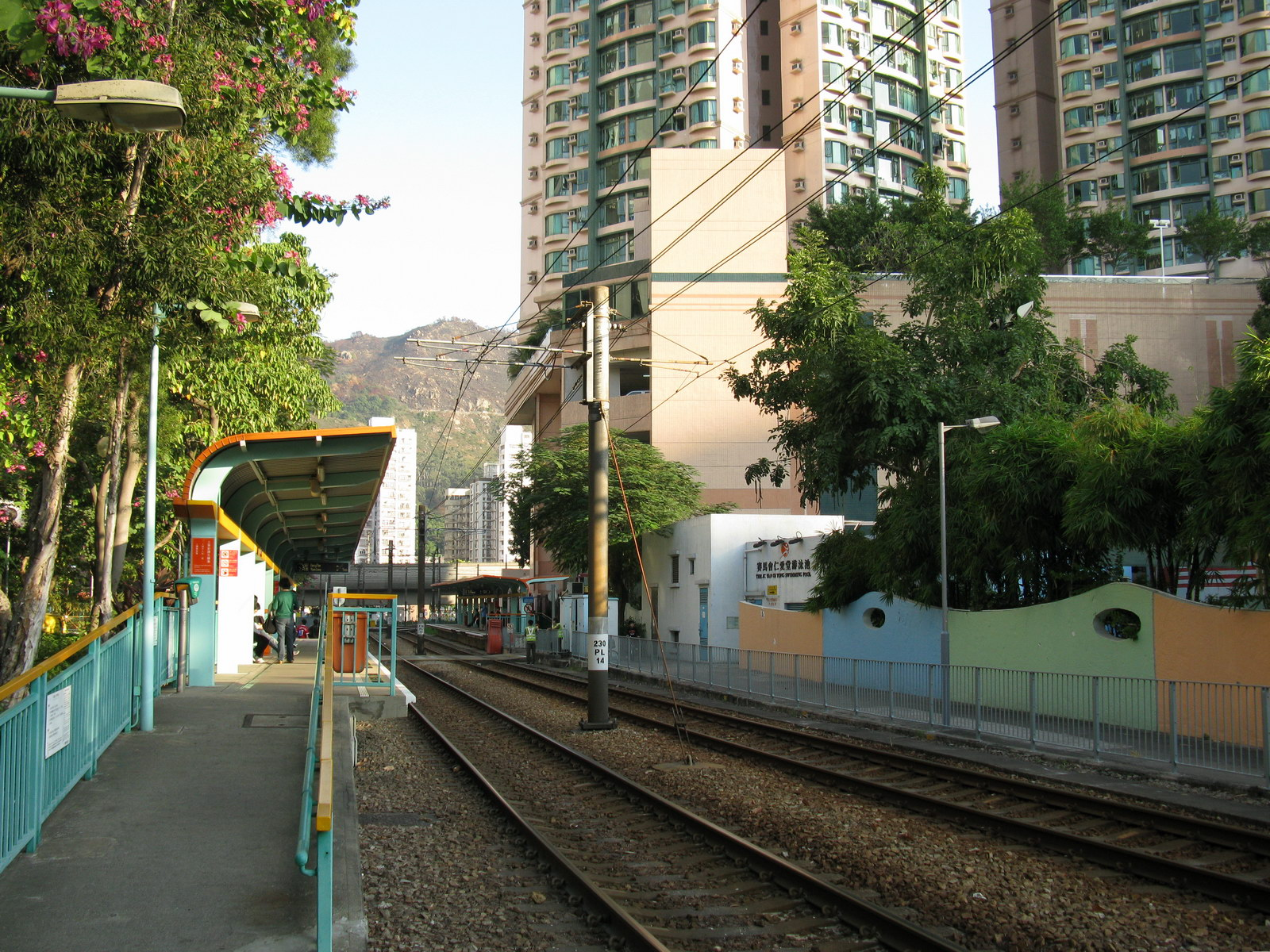
- Ngan Wai stop's Platform

General information
- Location: Affluence Garden and Chelsea Heights; Tuen Mun District; Hong Kong
- System: MTR Light Rail stop
- Owner: KCR Corporation
- Operator: MTR Corporation
- Line: 507 610
- Platforms: 2 side platforms
- Tracks: 2
- Connections: Bus, minibus

Construction
- Structure type: At-grade
- Accessible: yes

Other information
- Station code: NGW (English code); 230 (Digital code)
- Fare zone: 2

History
- Opened: 18 September 1988; 37 years ago

Services
Preceding stop	MTR Light Rail	Following stop
Tai Hing (South) towards Tin King	507	Choy Yee Bridge towards Tuen Mun Ferry Pier
Tai Hing (South) towards Tuen Mun Ferry Pier	610	Affluence towards Yuen Long
Location
- Location within MTR

Ngan Wai (Chinese: 銀圍) is an at-grade MTR Light Rail stop located at Chak Fung Street, between Affluence Garden and Chelsea Heights, in Tuen Mun District. It began service on 18 September 1988 and belongs to Zone 2.
