= Tai Hing (North) stop =

Light rail stop in Hong Kong

Coordinates: 22°24′17″N 113°58′13″E

Tai Hing (North) 大興 (北)
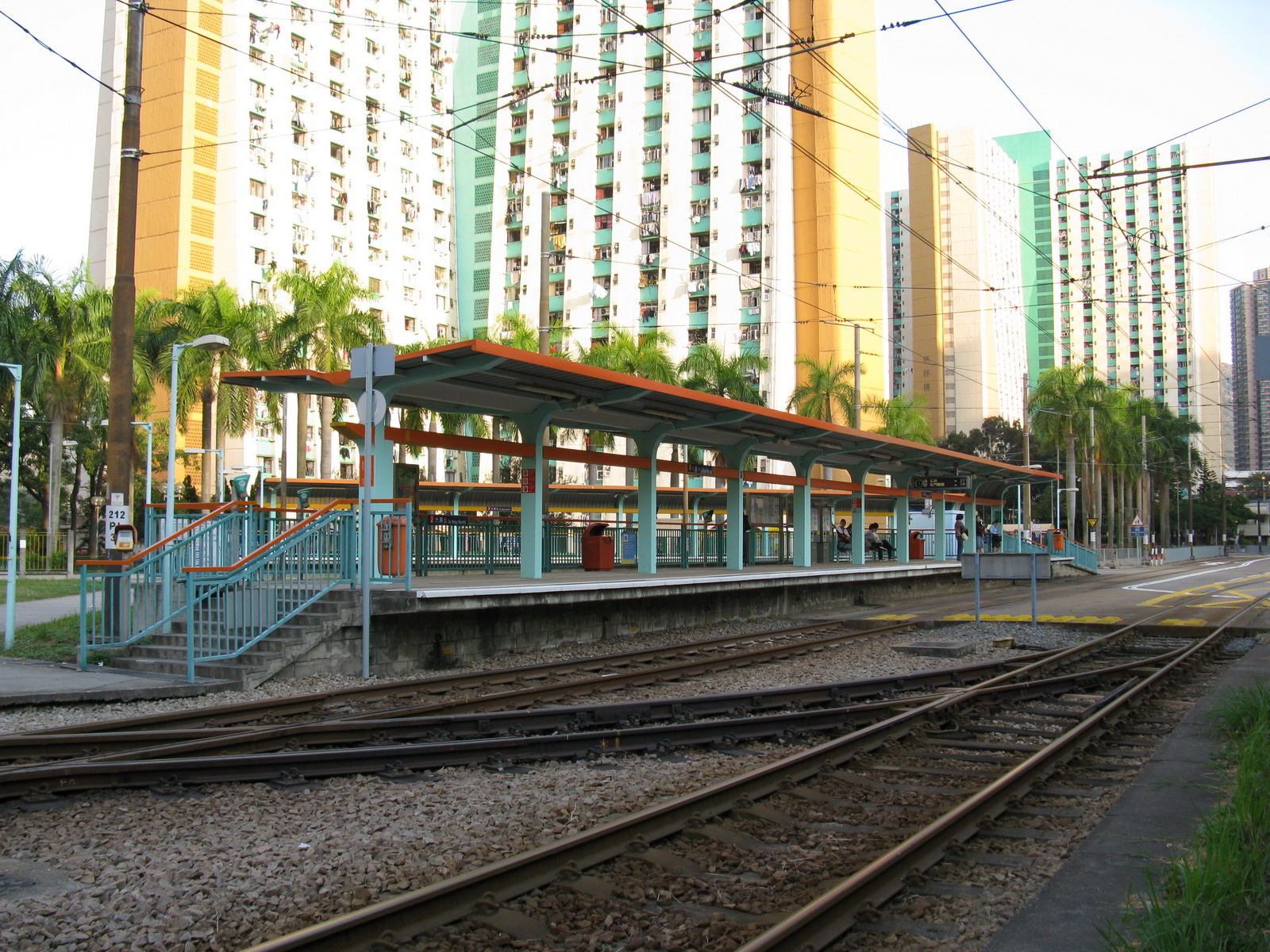
- Tai Hing (North) stop's Platform

General information
- Location: Tai Hing Estate; Tuen Mun District; Hong Kong
- System: MTR Light Rail stop
- Owner: KCR Corporation
- Operator: MTR Corporation
- Line: 507 610
- Platforms: 3 side platforms
- Tracks: 3
- Connections: Bus, minibus

Construction
- Structure type: At-grade
- Accessible: yes

Other information
- Station code: THN (English code); 212 (Digital code)
- Fare zone: 2

History
- Opened: 18 September 1988; 37 years ago

Services
Preceding stop	MTR Light Rail	Following stop
San Wai towards Tin King	507	Tai Hing (South) towards Tuen Mun Ferry Pier
Shek Pai towards Tuen Mun Ferry Pier	610	Tai Hing (South) towards Yuen Long
Location
- Location within MTR

Tai Hing (North) (Chinese: 大興 (北)) is an at-grade MTR Light Rail stop located at Tai Fong Street near Shi Hui Wen Secondary School, Tai Hing Estate, in Tuen Mun District. It began service on 18 September 1988 and belongs to Zone 2. It serves the north of Tai Hing Estate.
