= Choy Yee Bridge stop =

Light rail stop in Tuen Mun, Hong Kong

Coordinates: 22°24′00″N 113°58′27″E

Choy Yee Bridge 蔡意橋
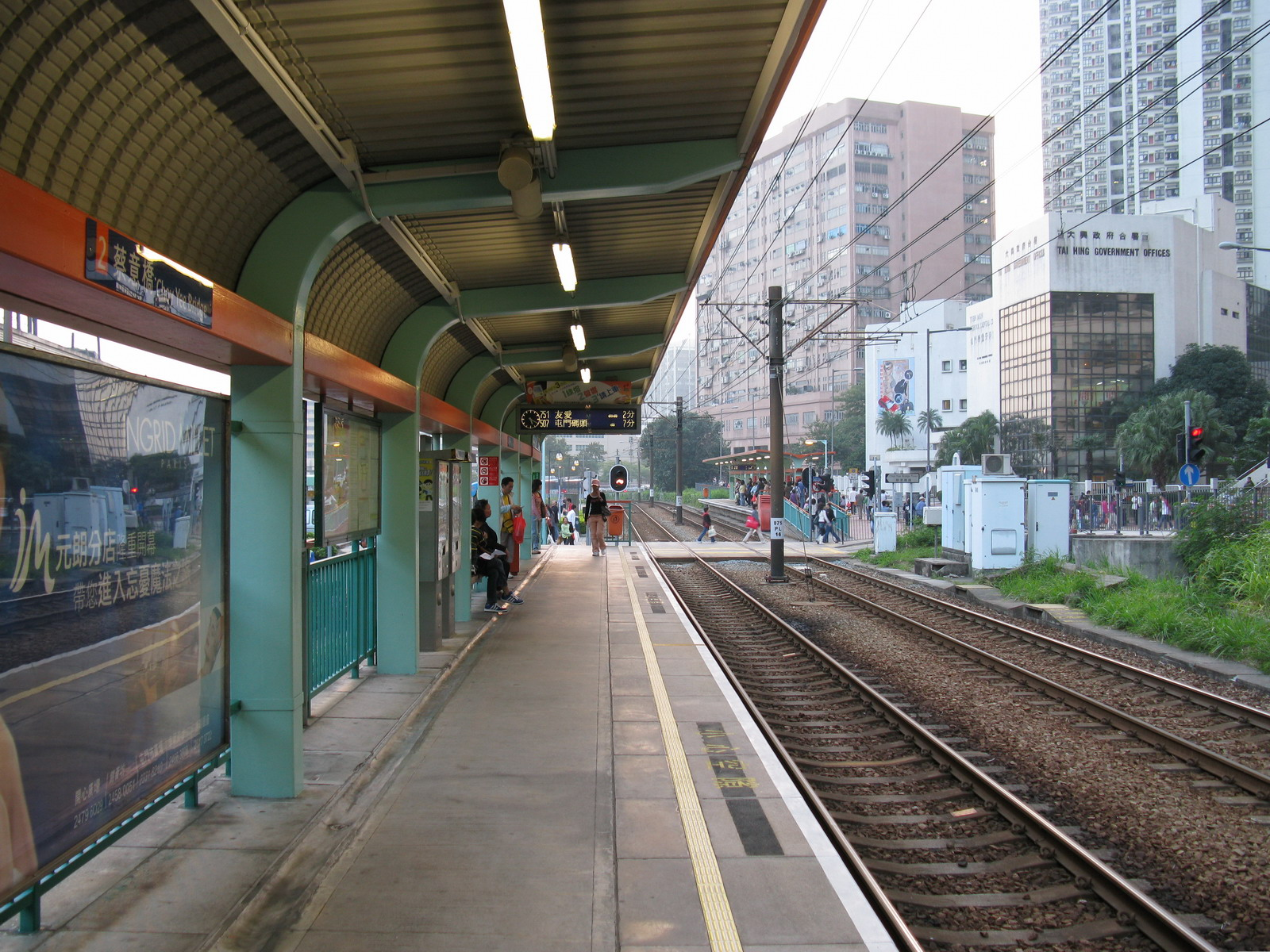
- Choy Yee Bridge stop platform (around 2000s)

General information
- Location: Choy Yee Bridge; Tuen Mun District; Hong Kong
- System: MTR Light Rail stop
- Owner: KCR Corporation
- Operator: MTR Corporation
- Line: 507 751
- Platforms: 2 side platforms
- Tracks: 2
- Connections: Bus, minibus

Construction
- Structure type: At-grade
- Accessible: yes

Other information
- Station code: CYB (English code); 075 (Digital code)
- Fare zone: 2

History
- Opened: 18 September 1988; 37 years ago

Services
Preceding stop	MTR Light Rail	Following stop
Ngan Wai towards Tin King	507	Ho Tin towards Tuen Mun Ferry Pier
Ho Tin towards Yau Oi	751	Affluence towards Tin Yat
Location
- Location within MTR

Choy Yee Bridge (Chinese: 蔡意橋) is an at-grade MTR Light Rail stop located at the junction of Shek Pai Tau Road and Choy Yee Bridge in Tuen Mun District. Named after the nearby Choy Yee Bridge, the stop began service on 18 September 1988 and belongs to Zone 2. It serves nearby Chelsea Heights Phase II.
