= San Fat Estate =

Housing estate in Tuen Mun, Hong Kong

Coordinates: 22.3948°N 113.97312°E

San Fat Estate (Chinese: 新發邨) was the first public housing estate in Tuen Mun, New Territories, Hong Kong, located on reclaimed land near the Tuen Mun River, at the junction of Pui To Road and Tuen Mun Heung Sze Wui Road. It consisted of four residential blocks completed in 1971, offering 2,131 flats with more than 6,000 residents. It was the smallest rental estate in Tuen Mun. Currently it is rebuilt as the MTR property development project “Century Gateway”.

== History ==
Tuen Mun New Town project was then known as Castle Peak New Town and thus the estate was originally named Castle Peak Estate (青山邨). After the Hong Kong Government renamed Castle Peak to Tuen Mun in 1974, the estate was renamed San Fat Estate in honour of Chan Yat-sen and Lau Wong-fat, prominent figures in Heung Yee Kuk.

The estate was home to the Hoh Fuk Tong Primary School, which later relocated to Lung Mun Oasis. It also had a 5-a-side football pitch, shops, a bank, and a garden.

The estate was listed in the Comprehensive Redevelopment Programme in 1988 that planned for the redevelopment of the Housing Authority's older estates. The 1996 "Five-Year Redevelopment Programme" announced that the estate would be demolished in 2000-01 due to its age, and to free up land for the construction of the Tuen Mun station of the West Rail. About 7,000 residents in total had to be relocated for the construction of the West Rail, and most of these were in San Fat Estate. Residents of the estate submitted a 500-name petition against the proposed railway alignment. The estate was demolished between November 2001 and January 2002.

A light rail station, called San Fat stop, opened in 1988. It was rebuilt above ground level to integrate it with the new West Rail station and renamed Tuen Mun stop in 2003.

The MTR station is actually built on a viaduct over the nullah, and not on the former site of San Fat Estate. Following completion of the station, the former site of the estate was used as a temporary parking lot, and as a public transport interchange. The site was then developed jointly by KCR Corporation and Sun Hung Kai Properties as a shopping centre called "V City" (opened 2012–13) and a private residential estate above called "Century Gateway", comprising seven blocks and 1,990 flats.

== Houses ==
Name	Building type	Completed	Demolished	No. of storeys
Block 1	-	1971	2001-2002	16
Block 2	-	1971	2001-2002	8
Block 3	-	1971	2001-2002	16
Block 4	-	1971	2001-2002	8
