= Tuen Mun River =

River in Tuen Mun, New Territories, Hong Kong

- Traditional Chinese: 屯門河
Transcriptions
Yue: Cantonese
- Jyutping: Tyun4 mun4 ho4

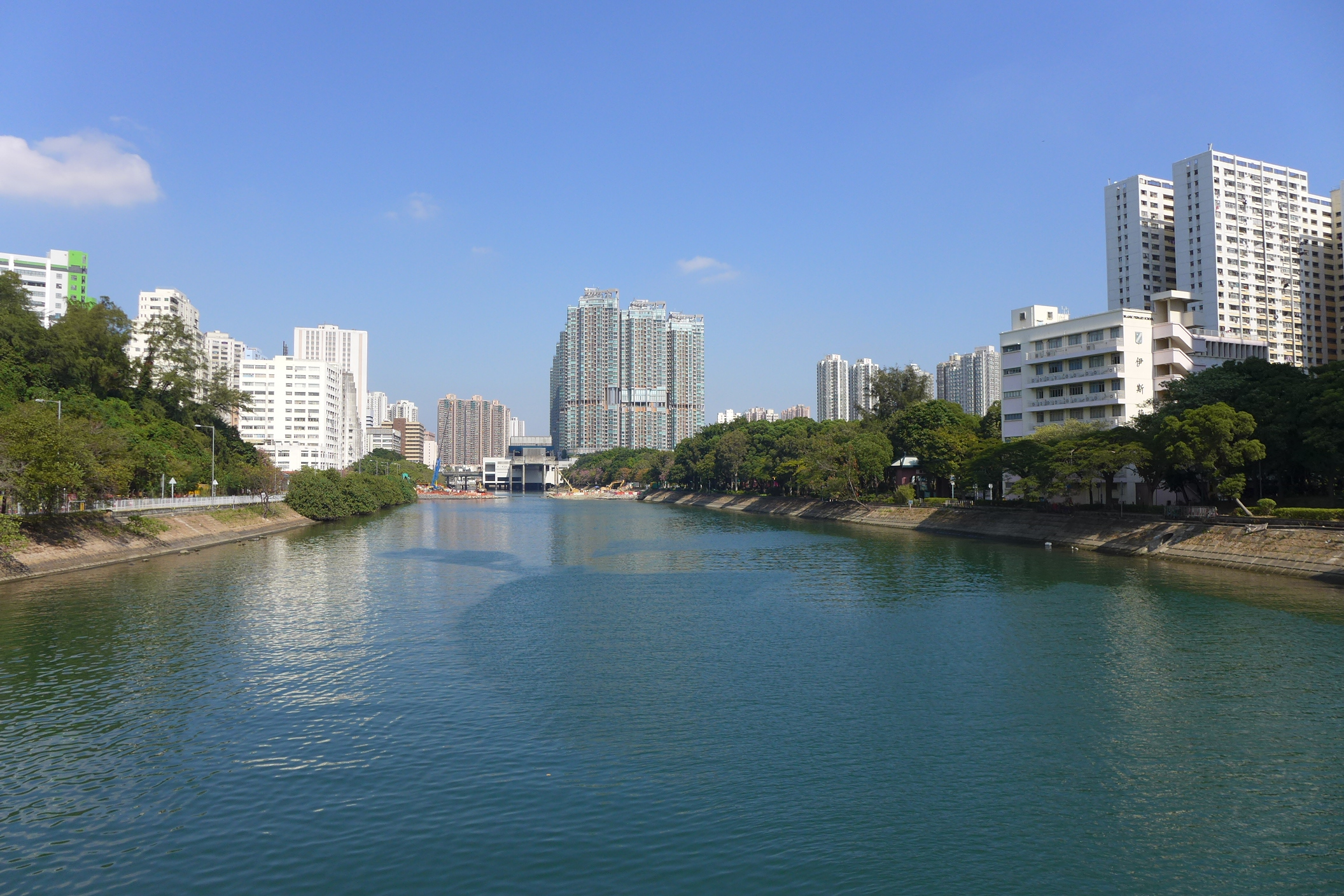
Tuen Mun River

The Tuen Mun River is a river in Tuen Mun, New Territories, Hong Kong. It has many tributaries, with major ones coming from Lam Tei, Kau Keng Shan, Hung Shui Hang and Nai Wai. It flows south, bisecting Tuen Mun New Town. It eventually feeds into the Tuen Mun Typhoon Shelter, which is part of Castle Peak Bay.

== See also ==
- Lam Tei
- List of rivers and nullahs in Hong Kong
- San Fat Estate
