= List of monuments and memorials to Michael Jackson =

This is a list of monuments and memorials to Michael Jackson (1958–2009), an American singer, songwriter, dancer, and philanthropist who is widely regarded as one of the most significant and influential cultural figures of the 20th century.

== Statues ==
Image	Location (and name)	Date	Sculptor(s)	Ref.
	Santarama Miniland, Glenesk, Johannesburg; South Africa; Statue of Michael Jackson^{26.2291°S 28.0538°E}	1997		
	The Baby'O, Judenau-Baumgarten, Lower Austria; Austria; Statue of Michael Jackson^{48.2847°N 16.0087°E}	1998	Diana Walczak, Stephen Pyle and Derek Howarth	
	Shan Yuan, Tsing Shan Tsuen, Tuen Mun District; Hong Kong; Michael Jackson Statue (Chinese: 米高積遜銅像)^{22.3878°N 113.9634°E}	October 7, 2009	Huang He (Chinese: 黄河)	
	Hard Rock Hotel Penang, Batu Ferringhi, Penang; Malaysia; Jackson as Abe Lincoln^{5.4675°N 100.2419°E}		Sculptureatwork	
	Michael Jackson Square, Favela Santa Marta, Rio de Janeiro; Brazil; Statue of Michael Jackson^{22.9471°S 43.1947°W}	2010	Ique Woitschach	
	Guangzhou Sculpture Park, Guangzhou, Guangdong; China; Michael Jackson Statue^{23.1547°N 113.2648°E}	January 1, 2011	Lu Zengkang (Chinese: 陆增康)	
	Vainera street, Yekaterinburg, Sverdlovsk Oblast; Russia; Monument to Michael Jackson (Russian: Памятник Майклу Джексону)^{56.8296°N 60.5972°E}	June 25, 2011	Victor Mosielev	
	Eastern Suburb Memory Music Park, Chengdu, Sichuan; China; Classic Impression (Chinese: 经典印象)^{30.6715°N 104.1216°E}	July 2011	Liu Shijun (Chinese: 刘世军)	
	Overland Park Arboretum & Botanical Gardens, Overland Park, Kansas; United States; Statue of Michael Jackson	November 5, 2011	Lu Zengkang (Chinese: 陆增康)	
	Landesbahnpark, Mistelbach, Lower Austria; Austria; Michael Jackson Monument (German: Michael Jackson Denkmal)^{48.5645°N 16.5649°E}	June 9, 2012 (monument unveiled); May 11, 2013 (statue added)		
	MagicLand, Valmontone, Lazio; Italy; Statue of Michael Jackson	August 29, 2013	Luca Izzo and Jusana Hopas	
	Dr. MGR Block, Vels Institute of Science, Technology & Advanced Studies, Pallavaram, Chennai, Tamil Nadu; India; Michael Jackson Statue (Tamil: மைக்கேல் ஜாக்சனின் சிலை)^{12.9587°N 80.1610°E}	April 7, 2016 (installed); 2010 (built)	Chandrasekaran	
	Lobby of Mandalay Bay, Paradise, Nevada; United States; Statue of Michael Jackson	July 28, 2016 (installed); 1994 (built)	Diana Walczak	
	Musicians Park, Shekvetili, Guria; Georgia; Sculpture of Michael Jackson^{41.9434°N 41.7746°E}	2016		
	Zhengzhou Erqi Wanda Plaza, Zhengzhou, Henan; China; Statue of Michael Jackson^{34.7207°N 113.6367°E}	June 15, 2019		
	Europark Idroscalo Milano, Segrate, Lombardy; Italy; MJ Italian Memorial Place^{45.4748°N 9.2861°E}	June 22, 2019	Diana Walczak, Stephen Pyle and Derek Howarth	
	Jiuhua Pavilion, Yugutai Historical and Cultural District, Ganzhou, Jiangxi; China; Statue of Michael Jackson	August 29, 2020		
	The UpTown, Nanning, Guangxi; China; Statue of Michael Jackson^{22.7887°N 108.3017°E}	August 29, 2020		
	Dahua 1935 Theatre, Xi'an, Shaanxi; China; Statue of Michael Jackson	August 29, 2020		
	Chengdu, Sichuan (Note: Before its relocation, the statue stood outside CapitaMall Tianfu on Tianren Road.); China; Statue of Michael Jackson	October 31, 2020 (unveiled); January 27, 2024 (relocated)		
	Zhongbei Road, Wuhan, Hubei; China; Statue of Michael Jackson^{30.5550°N 114.3348°E}	March 27, 2021		
	Found 158, Julu Road, Shanghai; China; Statue of Michael Jackson^{31.2252°N 121.4611°E}	June 23, 2023		
	Yongmo Village, Zhongshan, Guangdong; China; Statue of Michael Jackson	July 14, 2024		

=== Future statues ===
Image	Location (and name)	Date	Sculptor(s)	Ref.
	Krindjabo, Comoé; Ivory Coast; Statue of Michael Jackson	Already Created (groundbreaking)		

== Other monuments and memorials ==
Image	Location (and name)	Date	Creator(s)	Ref.
	6927 Hollywood Blvd., Los Angeles, California; United States; Hollywood Walk of Fame; Michael Jackson's Star^{34.1017°N 118.3411°W}	1984		
	Liseberg, Gothenburg; Sweden; Michael Jackson's Handprints and Signature	June 10, 1988		
	Liseberg, Gothenburg; Sweden; Michael Jackson's Star			
	Disney's Hollywood Studios, Walt Disney World Resort, Bay Lake, Florida; United States; Michael Jackson's Handprints	January 13, 1990		
	Olympic Way, Wembley Park, London; England; Michael Jackson Tile Mural^{51.5627°N 0.2796°W}	1993		
	1900 West Place (Former BET Headquarters), Washington, D.C. United States; BET Walk of Fame Award	September 22, 1995		
	Dante No Hiroba, Fukuoka; Japan; Michael Jackson's Hand Sculpture^{33.5949°N 130.3607°E}			
	Promenadeplatz, Munich, Bavaria; Germany; Orlando di Lasso Statue and Michael Jackson Memorial (German: Orlando-di-Lasso-Statue und zugleich Michael-Jackson-Gedenkstätte) (Note: There is an agreement between the Government of Upper Bavaria and Jackson's fans for the maintenance and cleaning of the base of the monument.)^{48.1401°N 11.5732°E}	2009		
	Erzsébet Square, Budapest; Hungary; Michael Jackson Memorial Tree (Hungarian: Michael Jackson Emlékfa)^{47.4977°N 19.0520°E}	2009		
	Bemowo, Warsaw; Poland; Memorial plaque to Michael Jackson^{52.2334°N 20.9058°E}			
	Woodlawn Cemetery, Detroit, Michigan; United States; Michael Jackson Cenotaph^{42.4414°N 83.1226°W}	2009		
	Jackson House, 2300 Jackson St., Gary, Indiana; United States; Memorial plaque to Michael Jackson^{41.5767°N 87.3436°W}	2009		
	Undisclosed location (presumably in Krindjabo or surrounding areas); Ivory Coast; Sacred Tomb of Michael Jackson (Note: Although devoid of mortal remains, the tomb is regarded as sacred because of Jackson's royal status in the Kingdom of Sanwi and is believed to contain his spirit according to Agni tradition.)	August 2, 2009		
	Forest Lawn Memorial Park, Leppington, New South Wales; Australia; Memorial plaque to Michael Jackson^{33.9558°S 150.8328°E}	August 29, 2009		
	Avenue of Stars [pl], Kraków; Poland; Michael Jackson's Star^{50.0528°N 19.9335°E}	August 29, 2009		
	Brenden Theatres, Palms Casino Resort, Paradise, Nevada; United States; Brenden Celebrity Star	August 29, 2009		
	Aleea Michael Jackson, Bucharest; Romania; Michael Jackson Memorial Monument^{44.4692°N 26.0803°E}	September 2009		
	Michael Jackson Square, Favela Santa Marta, Rio de Janeiro; Brazil; Michael Jackson Mosaic Mural^{22.9471°S 43.1947°W}	2010	Romero Britto	
	Santa Cruz de Tenerife, Canary Islands; Spain; 100 Faces of the Tenerife Auditorium (Spanish: Cien caras del Auditorio de Tenerife)^{28.4556°N 16.2498°W}	2010	Stojko Gagamov	
	Apollo Theater's Walk of Fame, New York City; United States; Michael Jackson's Plaque^{40.8099°N 73.9502°W}	June 14, 2010		
	Lyric Theatre, West End, London; England; Memorial plaque to Michael Jackson	June 24, 2010		
	Ballast Point Park, Birchgrove, Sydney; Australia "Locks of Love" Tribute Wall^{33.8519°S 151.1900°E}	September 25, 2010		
	Grauman's Chinese Theatre, Hollywood, California; United States; Michael Jackson's hand and footprints	January 26, 2012		
	Mercimekli, Midyat, Mardin Province; Turkey; Michael Jackson Monument	February 14, 2012	Mehmet Turkut	
	Kúpeľný park, Turčianske Teplice, Trenčín Region; Slovakia; Michael Jackson Memorial Bench	July 2013		
	Brooklyn Botanic Garden, New York City; United States; Michael Jackson Memorial Bench^{40.6697°N 73.9645°W}	August 27, 2014		
	Dětský Domov Charlotty Masarykové, Zbraslav, Prague; Czech Republic; Bust of Michael Jackson^{49.9692°N 14.3880°E}	September 27, 2014	Daniela Kartáková	
	1038 Venice Blvd., Los Angeles, California; United States; Dangerous (mural)^{34.0412°N 118.2790°W}	August 1, 2015	Owen Dippie	
	East 11th St., New York City; United States; Michael Jackson Mural^{40.7293°N 73.9838°W}	July 2018	Eduardo Kobra	
	Parque Safari, Rancagua, O'Higgins Region; Chile; Memorial Chile Michael Joseph Jackson^{34.1844°S 70.8026°W}	August 29, 2018		
	Rua São Bonifácio, Morumbi, São Paulo; Brazil; Michael Jackson Forever (mural)^{23.5898°S 46.6934°W}	2019	Paulo Terra	
	Zhenbeibao Grand Theatre, Yinchuan, Ningxia; China; Michael Jackson wax figure	August 29, 2020	Ma Yong	
	Black Music & Entertainment Walk of Fame, Atlanta, Georgia; United States	June 17, 2021		
	Traumpfad "Koberner Burgpfad", Kobern-Gondorf, Rhineland-Palatinate; Germany; Michael Jackson Memorial Bench (German: Michael Jackson Gedenkbank)^{50.3124°N 7.4563°E}	June 25, 2021		

== Eponyms ==
=== Roads ===
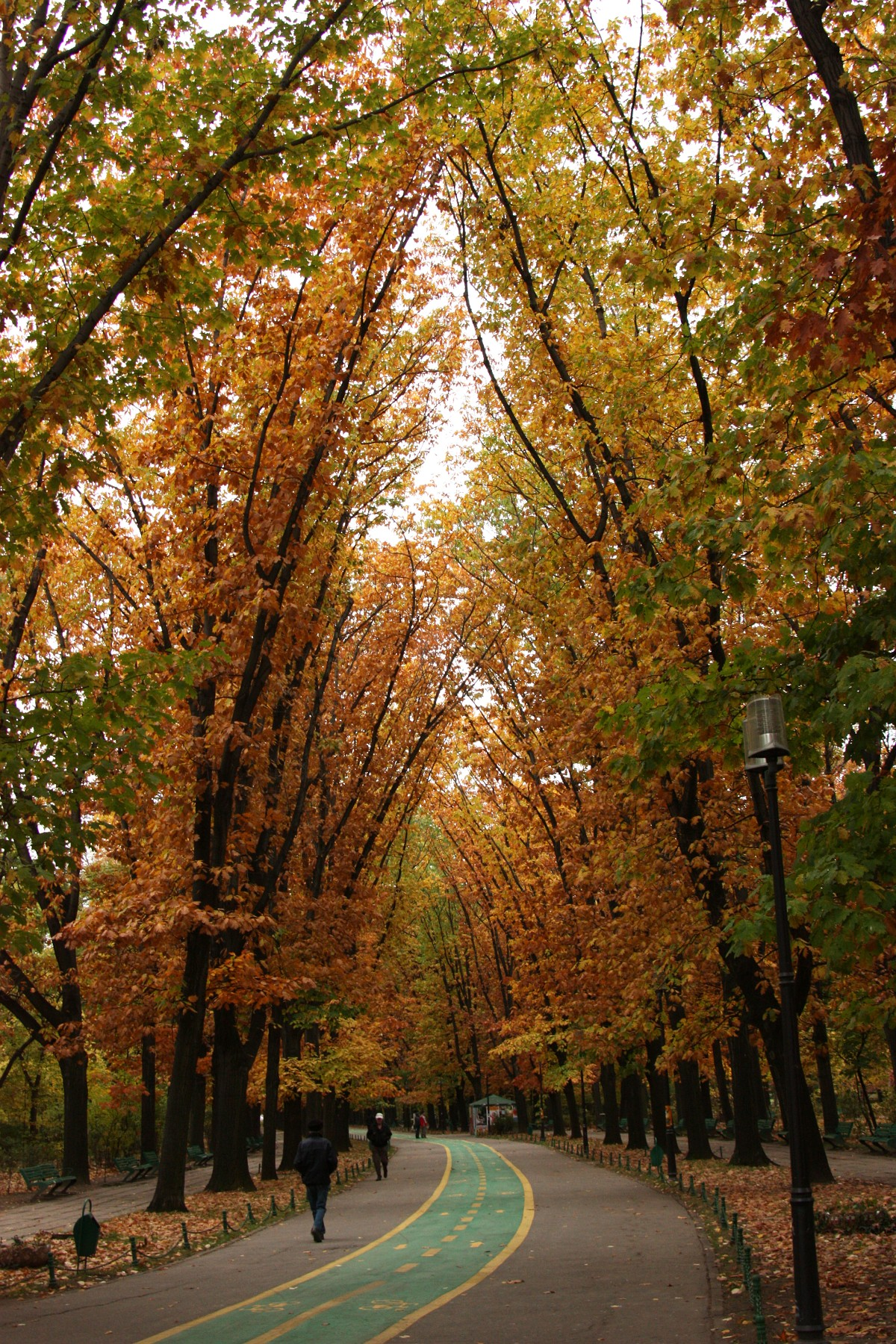
Aleea Michael Jackson in Bucharest

==== Brazil ====
- Rua Michael Joseph Jackson (Michael Joseph Jackson Street), a street in Cascavel Velho, Cascavel, Paraná
- Rua Michael Jackson (Michael Jackson Street), a street in Cubatão, São Paulo
- Rua Michael Jackson (Michael Jackson Street), a street in Vila João Paulo, Manaus, Amazonas
- Travessa Michael Jackson (Michael Jackson Lane), a street in Tucuruí, Pará

==== Gabon ====
- Rue Michael Jackson (Michael Jackson Street), a street in Lalala-Dakar, Libreville, Estuaire Province

==== Nigeria ====
- Michael Jackson Crescent, a street in Abuja

==== Romania ====
- Aleea Michael Jackson (Michael Jackson Alley), a pathway in Bucharest

=== Squares and urban parks ===
- Espaço Michael Jackson (Michael Jackson Square), a square in the Favela Santa Marta, Rio de Janeiro, Brazil
- Michael Jacksonplein (Michael Jackson Square), a square in Almere, Netherlands
- Michael-Jackson-Spielplatz (Michael Jackson Playground), a playground in Ratzdorf, Neißemünde, Brandenburg, Germany

=== Buildings ===
- Amfiteatr Bemowo im. Michaela Jacksona, (Note: In 2009, the amphitheater was named after Michael Jackson, and in 2019, a proposal to devote the building to a new patron was discussed. Nevertheless, no naming has ever had official character, nor has a renaming after a new patron been made, so Jackson's name continues to be commonly used, unofficially at present as before.) an amphitheater in Warsaw, Poland
- Michael Jackson Auditorium in Los Angeles, California, U.S.
- MJ Café at Ponte 16 in Santo António, Macau
- Michael Jackson One Theatre, part of the Mandalay Bay Resort and Casino, in Paradise, Nevada, U.S.
- King of Pop Museum, part of the Restaurant Brasserie 98, in Steffisburg, Switzerland
- Michael Jackson Secondary School (Swahili: Shule ya Sekondari Michael Jackson) in Wanging'ombe District, Njombe Region, Tanzania

=== Forests ===
==== England ====
- Michael's Acre, a forest area in Hucking, Maidstone, Kent

==== Turkey ====
- Michael Jackson Hatıra Ormanı (Michael Jackson Memorial Forest), a forest in Ahmetpaşa, Malkara, Tekirdağ
- Michael Jackson & Malcolm X Barış Ormanı (Michael Jackson & Malcolm X Peace Forest), a forest in Mercimekli, Midyat, Mardin

=== Species ===
- Mesoparapylocheles michaeljacksoni, an extinct hermit crab species
- Sarsamphiascus michaeli, a copepod species in the family Miraciidae

=== Awards ===
- Michael Jackson Video Vanguard Award, the highest prize given at the MTV Video Music Awards

== Removed monuments ==
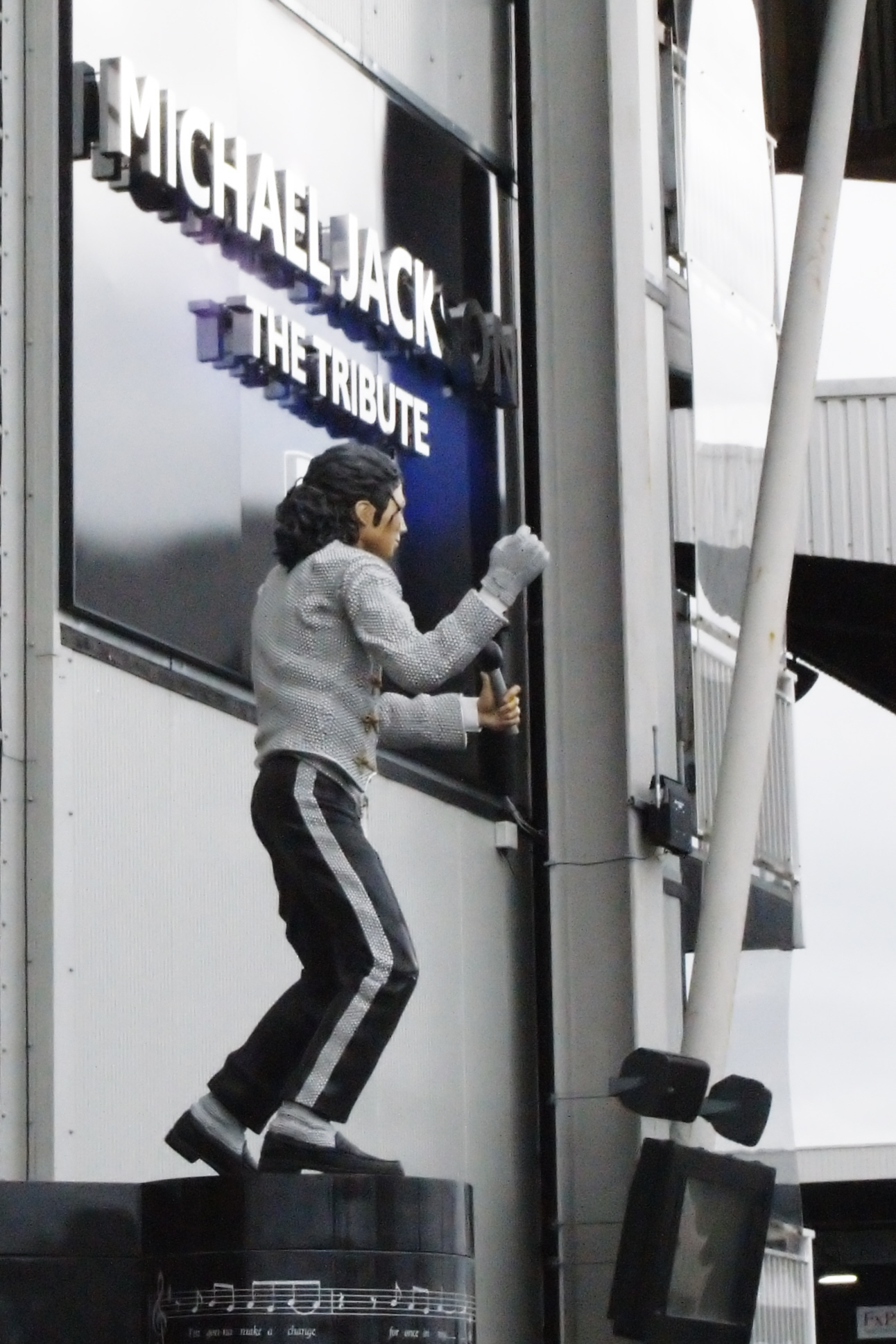
The statue outside Craven Cottage, London

A plaster and resin sculpture of Michael Jackson stood outside Craven Cottage in Fulham, London, the ground of Fulham Football Club, from 2011 until 2013. Later, it was on display at the National Football Museum in Manchester until 2019, when it was removed from public display. Currently, the statue remains in the care of the museum, stored in its Deepdale archive in Preston, Lancashire.

Other cases of removed monuments to Jackson include a statue initially located in the Shopping City Süd, in the Austrian district of Mödling, which in 1998 was moved to the center of a venue square used for parties and events organized by the club Baby'O, in Judenau-Baumgarten, Lower Austria. Later, due to the conversion of the club's building into apartments, the statue was sold by its then-owner Franz Zika in 2020. Another statue of Jackson was removed in 2019 from the front of a McDonald's restaurant in Best, Netherlands, where it had been located since 1996 when the restaurant's franchisee purchased the statue, which was previously donated by Jackson, in support of Ronald McDonald House Charities. However the owner Peter van Gelder confirmed that the statue has not been permanently taken down and instead is going to be relocated when a more suitable location can be found. Both statues were larger-scale replicas of the 10-foot sculpture of Jackson depicted on the cover of Jackson's HIStory: Past, Present and Future, Book I album. Another statue of Jackson, which had stood in the Nali Patio in Sanlitun, Beijing, since August 29, 2020, was removed from the place before it was demolished in 2024.

== See also ==
- Cultural impact of Michael Jackson
