= TWN (disambiguation) =

TWN may refer to

- Tarifverbund Nordwestschweiz, the twn (fare network) in north-western Switzerland
- ISO 3166-1 alpha-3 country code assigned to Taiwan, under the designated title of "Taiwan, Province of China"
- The Weather Network, a Canadian specialty channel
- The name used in certain export markets by Triumph, a German former motorcycle manufacturer.
- translatewiki.net, a wiki used to translate software
- The White Noise, an American rock band from Los Angeles, California
- Town Green railway station, Lancashire, England (National Rail station code TWN)
- Tsing Wun stop, a Light Rail stop in Hong Kong (MTR station code TWN)
