= Tsing Shan Tsuen stop =

Light rail stop in Tuen Mun, Hong Kong

Coordinates: 22°23′26″N 113°58′02″E

Tsing Shan Tsuen 青山村
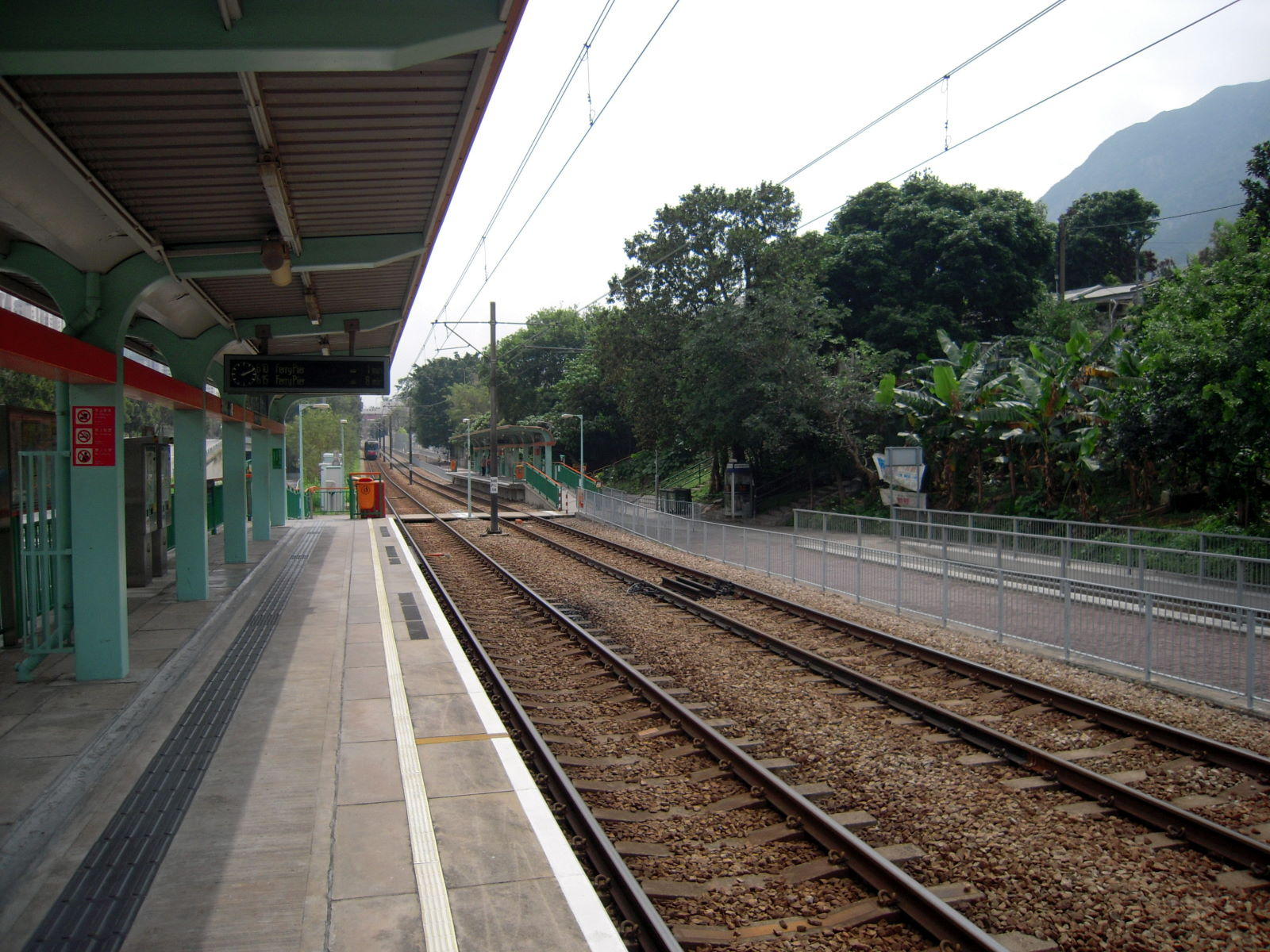
- Tsing Shan Tsuen stop platform

General information
- Location: Tsing Shan Tsuen; Tuen Mun District; Hong Kong
- System: MTR Light Rail stop
- Owner: KCR Corporation
- Operator: MTR Corporation
- Line: 610 615 615P
- Platforms: 2 side platforms
- Tracks: 2
- Connections: Bus, minibus

Construction
- Structure type: At-grade
- Accessible: yes

Other information
- Station code: TSS (English code); 040 (Digital code)
- Fare zone: 2

History
- Opened: 18 September 1988; 37 years ago

Services
Preceding stop	MTR Light Rail	Following stop
Lung Mun towards Tuen Mun Ferry Pier	610	Tsing Wun towards Yuen Long
Lung Mun towards Tuen Mun Ferry Pier	615	Tsing Wun towards Yuen Long
Lung Mun towards Tuen Mun Ferry Pier	615P	Tsing Wun towards Siu Hong
Location
- Location within MTR

Tsing Shan Tsuen (Chinese: 青山村) is an MTR Light Rail stop. It is located at ground level at the junction of Tsing Wun Road and Yip Wong Road, east of Tsing Shan Tsuen and west of Nan Fung Industrial City, in Tuen Mun District. It began service on 18 September 1988 and belongs to fare zone 2. It serves Tsing Shan Tsuen, Tuen Mun Kau Hui, and nearby industrial areas.
