= Lung Mun (constituency) =

Hong Kong constituency

- 龍門
- Elected constituency for the Tuen Mun District Council
- Boundary of Lung Mun in Tuen Mun District
- District: Tuen Mun
- Legislative Council constituency: New Territories North West
- Population: 17,075 (2019)
- Electorate: 10,270 (2019)

Current constituency
- Created: 1994
- Number of members: One
- Member: Vacant

Lung Mun (Chinese: 龍門) is one of the 31 constituencies in the Tuen Mun District.

Created for the 1994 District Board elections, the constituency returns one district councillor to the Tuen Mun District Council, with an election every four years.

Lung Mun loosely covers areas surrounding Lung Mun Oasis, Lung Yat Estate, Tsing Shan Tsuen, Tuen Mun Kau Hui and Yeung Siu Hang in Tuen Mun with an estimated population of 17,075.

== Councillors represented ==
Election	Member	Party
2019	Tsang Kam-wing→Vacant	Lung Mun Concern Group

== Election results ==
=== 2010s ===
Tuen Mun District Council Election, 2019: Lung Mun
Party	Candidate	Votes	%	±%
LMCG	Tsang Kam-wing	4,410	60.07	
DAB	Lung Shui-hing	2,931	39.93	
Majority		1,479	20.94	
Turnout		7,367	71.77	
LMCG gain from DAB		Swing		
