= Statue of Michael Jackson (Fulham F.C.) =

Statue at Craven Cottage, London, from 2011 to 2013

Coordinates: 53°29′08″N 2°14′31″W

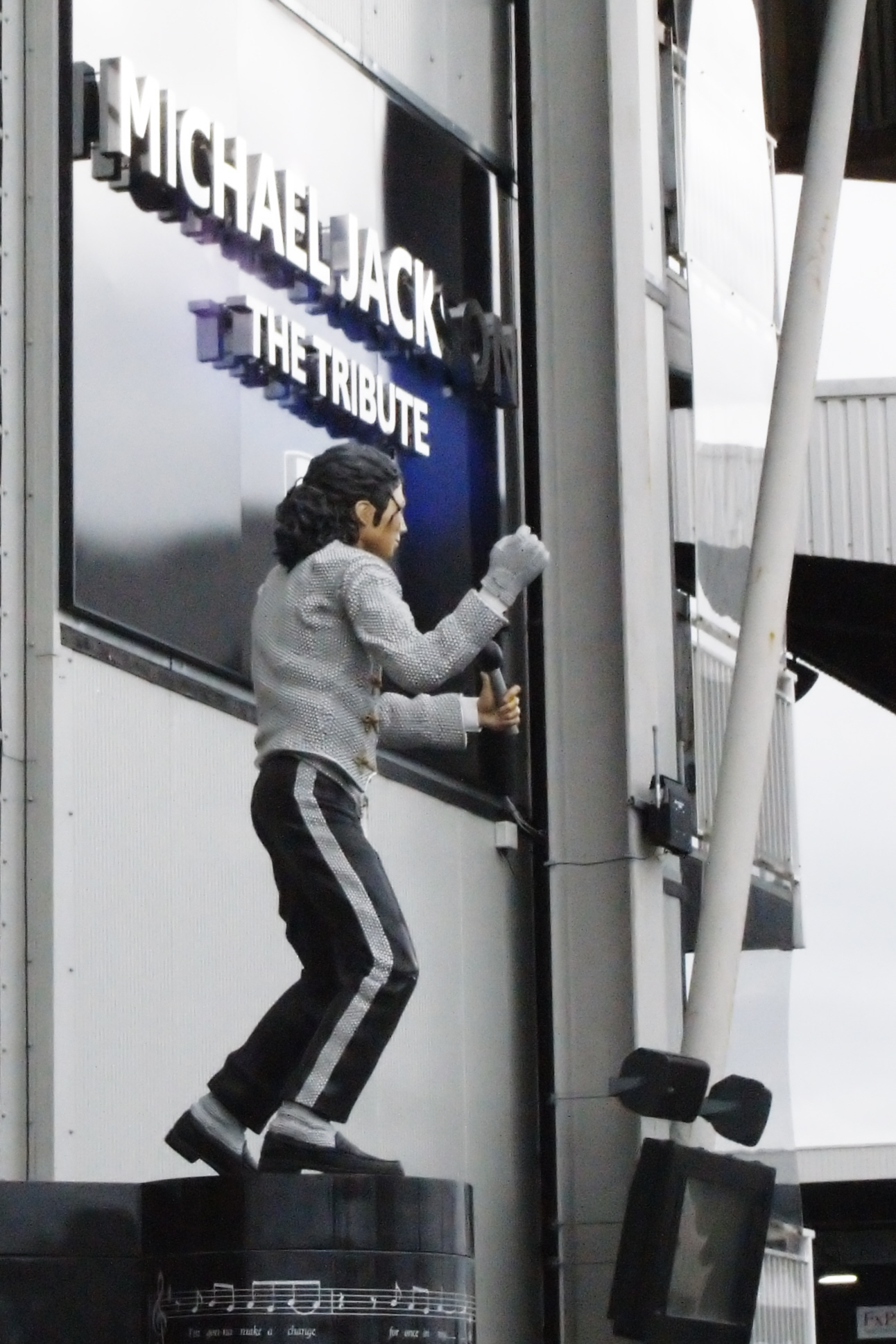
- The statue outside Craven Cottage, London
- Interactive map of Statue of Michael Jackson
- Location: National Football Museum, Manchester
- Type: Statue
- Material: Plaster and resin
- Height: 7.5 feet (2.3 m)
- Opening date: 3 April 2011

A plaster and resin sculpture of Michael Jackson stood outside Craven Cottage in Fulham, London, the ground of Fulham Football Club, from 2011 until 2013. Commissioned by the club's chairman Mohamed Al-Fayed, it was removed by his successor Shahid Khan. From 2014 to 2019 the statue was on display at the National Football Museum in Manchester.

== Description ==
The statue is 7.5 feet (2.3 m) high and is made of plaster and resin.

== Inspiration ==
Jackson was a friend of Al-Fayed. He had attended a football match, in 1999, at Craven Cottage as a friend of Al-Fayed to see Fulham play Wigan Athletic. Following Jackson's death in 2009 Al-Fayed commissioned a statue with the plan of siting it inside Harrods in Knightsbridge, London, at the time owned by Al-Fayed. After the sale of Harrods the department store's new Qatari owners did not want the statue, and Al-Fayed arranged for it to be placed outside Craven Cottage.

== Unveiling and reception ==
The statue was unveiled on 3 April 2011 by Al-Fayed before Fulham's game against Blackpool. The reception of the sculpture was almost all negative. It was described as kitsch and received comments from some fans of Fulham F.C. such as, "We're a laughing stock. It has nothing to do with football." and "It makes the club look silly. I thought it was an April Fools joke." Some Fulham footballers, including Brede Hangeland, supported the club's decision to commission the statue. After the unveiling Fulham won their game against Blackpool, 3–0. Louisa Buck, the contemporary art correspondent for The Art Newspaper, described it as "a spectacularly bad piece of kitsch that doesn't even look all that much like Michael Jackson". Fisun Guner, an art critic for The Arts Desk website, said "It certainly looks as if his plasticky limbs were too stiff to co-ordinate properly so he's doing a bit of a constipated, Metal Mickey dance. However, I have a strong feeling that Michael would have simply loved it."

== Removal and resiting ==
In July 2013, Shahid Khan completed the purchase of Fulham F.C. from Mohamed Al-Fayed, for a fee believed to be between £150m and £200m. In September 2013 it was decided that the statue would be removed and returned to Al-Fayed; the statue was not part of the ground's redevelopment plans. On 3 May 2014 Fulham were relegated from the Premier League after 13 seasons in the league, the top tier of English Football. Al-Fayed blamed the removal of the statue for causing the club's relegation. The statue was moved to the National Football Museum in Manchester in May 2014. On 6 March 2019, the statue was removed from the National Football Museum, with a spokesperson saying that it had been planned for several months to introduce exhibits that "better represent" football. The removal came after the documentary Leaving Neverland, in which allegations of child sexual abuse by Jackson were made.

== See also ==
- List of public art formerly in London
- List of monuments and memorials to Michael Jackson
