= Yeung Siu Hang =

Village in Tuen Mun District, Hong Kong

Coordinates: 22.394722°N 113.965209°E

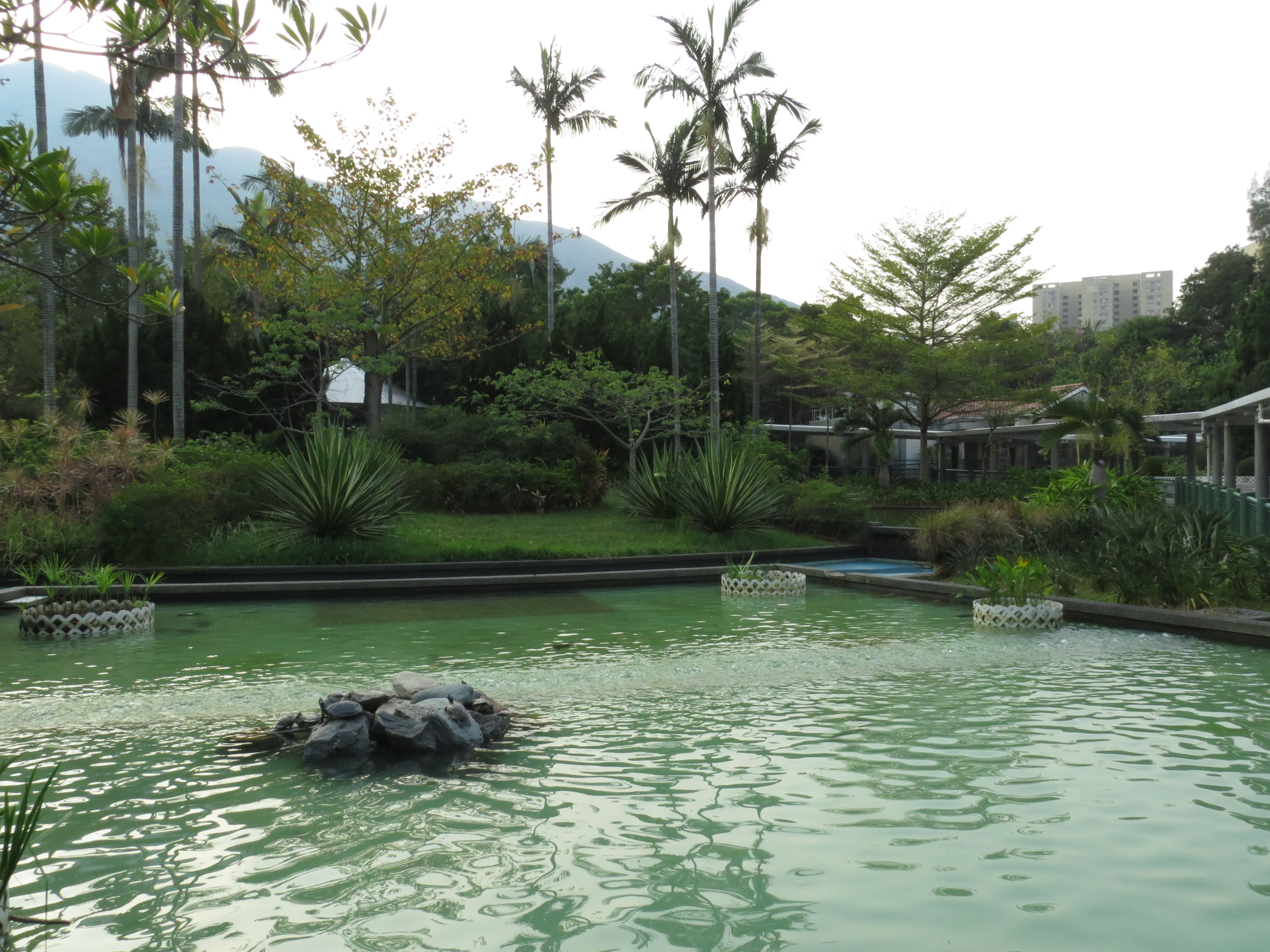
Yeung Siu Hang Garden (楊小坑錦簇花園) is located in the vicinity of Yeung Siu Hang.

Yeung Siu Hang (Chinese: 楊小坑) is a village in Tuen Mun District, Hong Kong.

== Administration ==
Yeung Siu Hang is a recognized village under the New Territories Small House Policy. It is one of the 36 villages represented within the Tuen Mun Rural Committee. For electoral purposes, Yeung Siu Hang is part of the Lung Mun constituency.
