= Tsing Shan Tsuen =

Coordinates: 22.389205°N 113.96475°E

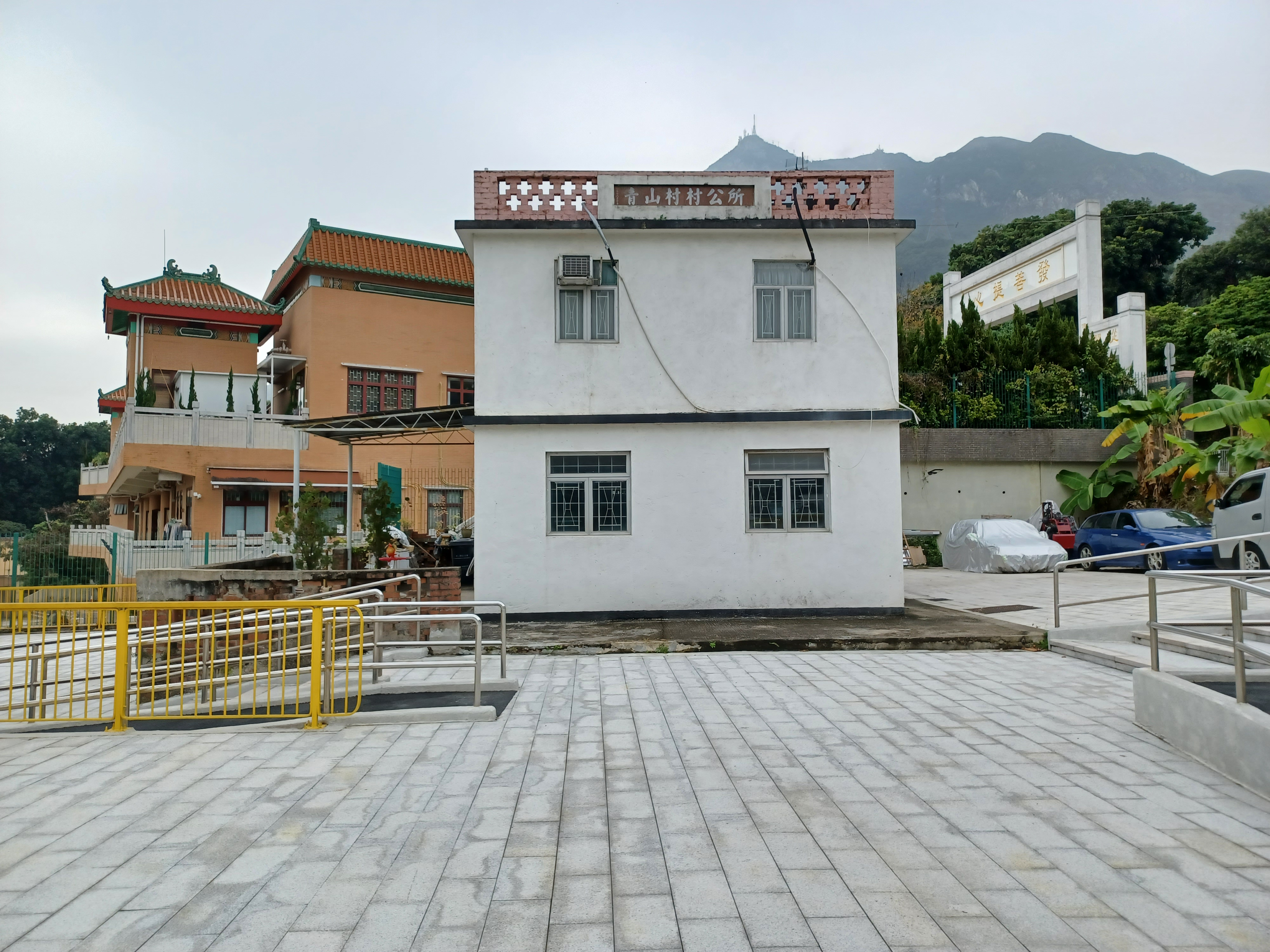
Tsing Shan Tsuen Village Office. Yuan Ming Monastery (圓明寺) and Castle Peak are visible in the background.

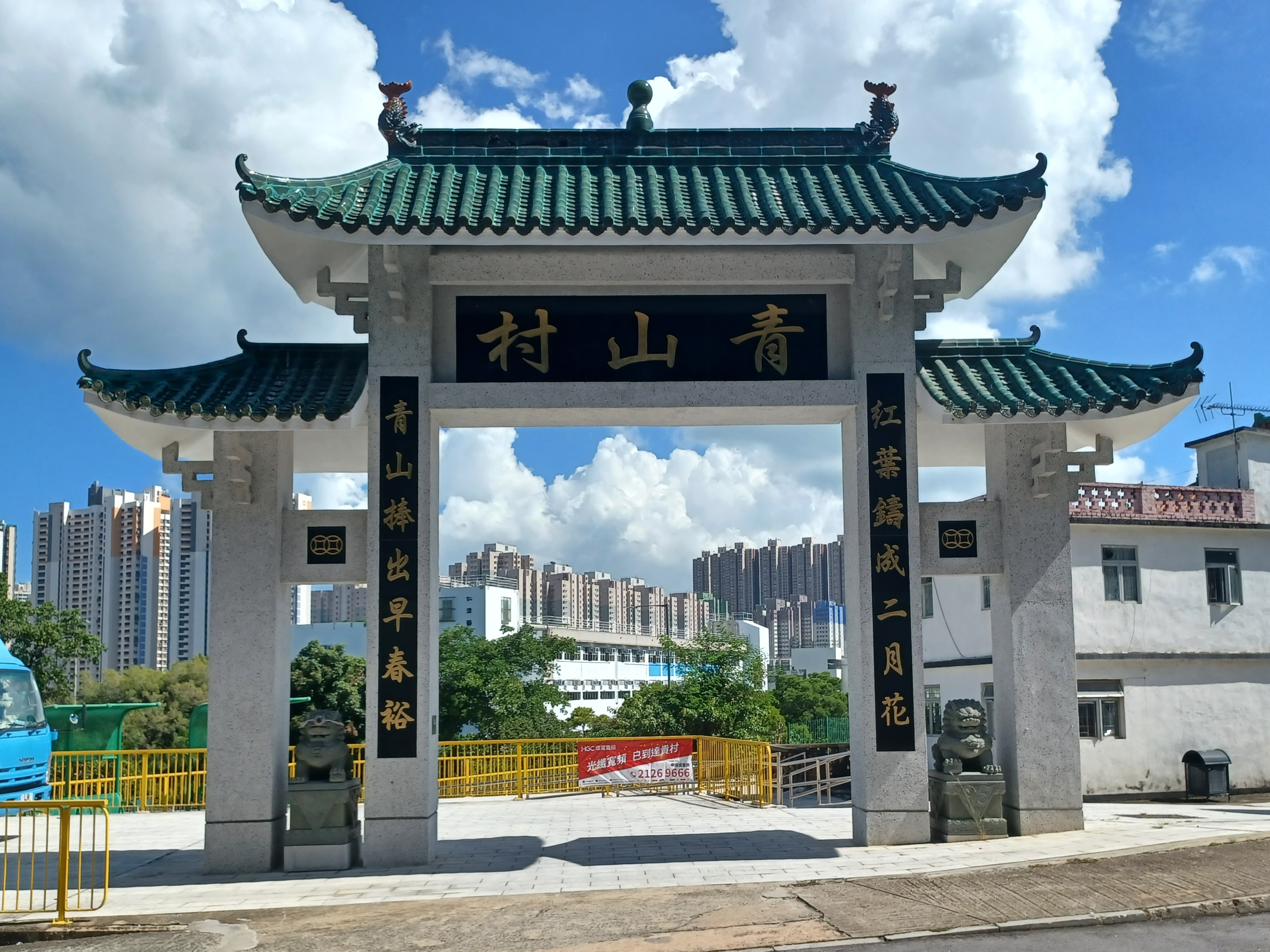
Paifang of Tsing Shan Tsuen.

Tsing Shan Tsuen (Chinese: 青山村) is a village in Tuen Mun District, Hong Kong.

== Administration ==
Tsing Shan Tsuen is one of the 36 villages represented within the Tuen Mun Rural Committee. For electoral purposes, Tsing Shan Tsuen is part of the Lung Mun constituency.

== Conservation ==
The location of a cinnamomum cassia tree within Ho Shek Nunnery (荷石精舍) was designated as a Site of Special Scientific Interest in 1976. It was de-designated in 2008.

== See also ==
- Tsing Shan Monastery
- Tsing Shan Tsuen stop
