= Tsing Wun stop =

Light rail stop in Tuen Mun, Hong Kong

Coordinates: 22°23′39″N 113°58′03″E

Tsing Wun 青雲
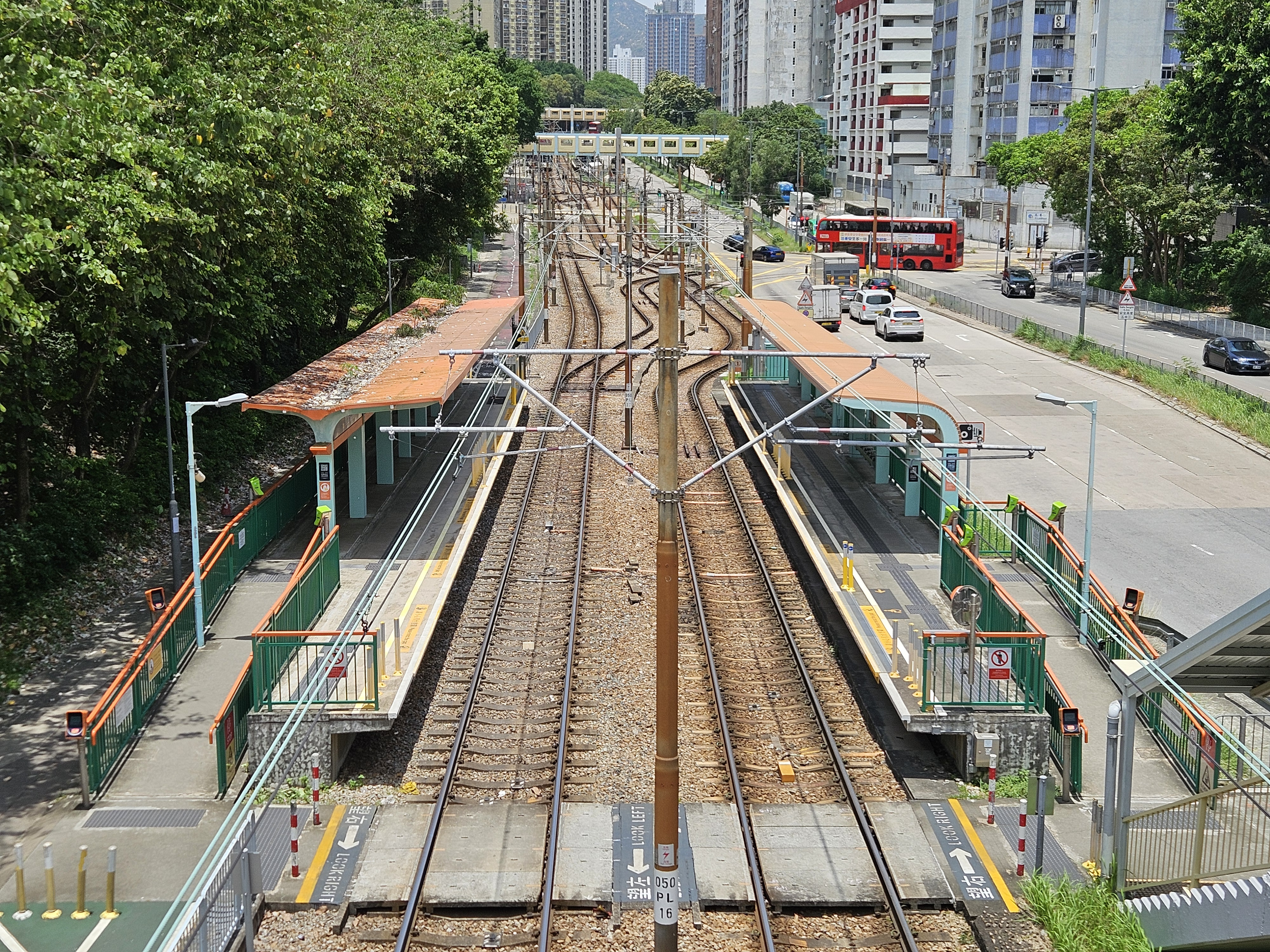
- Tsing Wun stop platform

General information
- Location: Tsing Wun Road; Tuen Mun District; Hong Kong
- System: MTR Light Rail stop
- Owner: KCR Corporation
- Operator: MTR Corporation
- Line: 610 615 615P
- Platforms: 2 side platforms
- Tracks: 2
- Connections: Bus, minibus

Construction
- Structure type: At-grade
- Accessible: yes

Other information
- Station code: TWN (English code); 050 (Digital code)
- Fare zone: 2

History
- Opened: 18 September 1988; 37 years ago

Services
Preceding stop	MTR Light Rail	Following stop
Tsing Shan Tsuen towards Tuen Mun Ferry Pier	610	Ming Kum towards Yuen Long
Tsing Shan Tsuen towards Tuen Mun Ferry Pier	615	Ming Kum towards Yuen Long
Tsing Shan Tsuen towards Tuen Mun Ferry Pier	615P	Ming Kum towards Siu Hong
Location
- Location within MTR

Tsing Wun (Chinese: 青雲) is one of the MTR Light Rail stops. It is located at ground level at Tsing Wun Road near Hong Kong Institute of Vocational Education (IVE) (Tuen Mun) in Tuen Mun District. It began service on 18 September 1988 and belongs to Zone 2. It serves IVE (Tuen Mun) and nearby industrial areas.

== History ==
This stop was originally named "Lung Mun" (龍門) as it is located at Lung Mun Road. Later, the section of Lung Mun Road near the stop was renamed to Ming Kum Road, so the stop was renamed to "Technical Institute" (工業學院) as it is next to Tuen Mun Technical Institute. The stop was renamed again to the current "Tsing Wun" in 2003 after Tuen Mun Technical Institute was renamed to Hong Kong Institute of Vocational Education (Tuen Mun) in 1999.
