= Craven Cottage =

Football stadium in Fulham, West London, England

Coordinates: 51°28′30″N 0°13′18″W

- Craven Cottage on a matchday in 2026
- Interactive map of Craven Cottage
- Full name: Craven Cottage
- Location: Stevenage Road; Fulham; London; SW6 6HH
- Owner: Fulham
- Operator: Fulham
- Capacity: 28,107
- Surface: Grass (Fibrelastic)
- Record attendance: 49,335 (8 October 1938)
- Field size: 100 by 65 metres (109.4 yd × 71.1 yd)
- Public transit: Putney Bridge; Hammersmith; Parsons Green; East Putney

Construction
- Built: 1780 (as a cottage)
- Opened: 1896 (as a stadium)
- Architect: Archibald Leitch

Tenants
- Fulham (1896–2002, 2004–present); Fulham Ladies (2000–2003); Fulham RLFC (1980–1984)

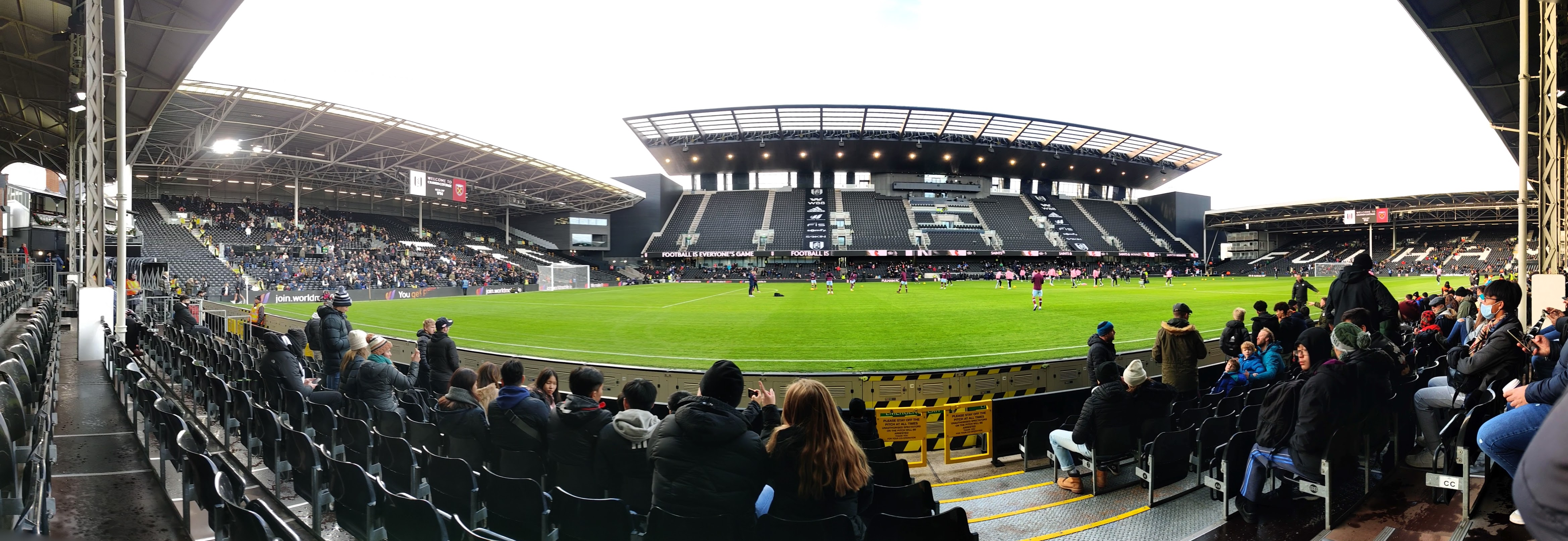
Panorama View from the Johnny Haynes Stand

Craven Cottage is a football stadium in Fulham, West London, England, which has been the home of Fulham F.C. since 1896. The ground's capacity is 28,107; the record attendance is 49,335, for a game against Millwall in 1938. Next to Bishop's Park on the banks of the River Thames, it was originally a royal hunting lodge and has a history dating back over 300 years.

The stadium has also been used by national teams and was formerly the home ground for rugby league club Fulham RLFC.

== Life ==
=== Pre-Fulham ===
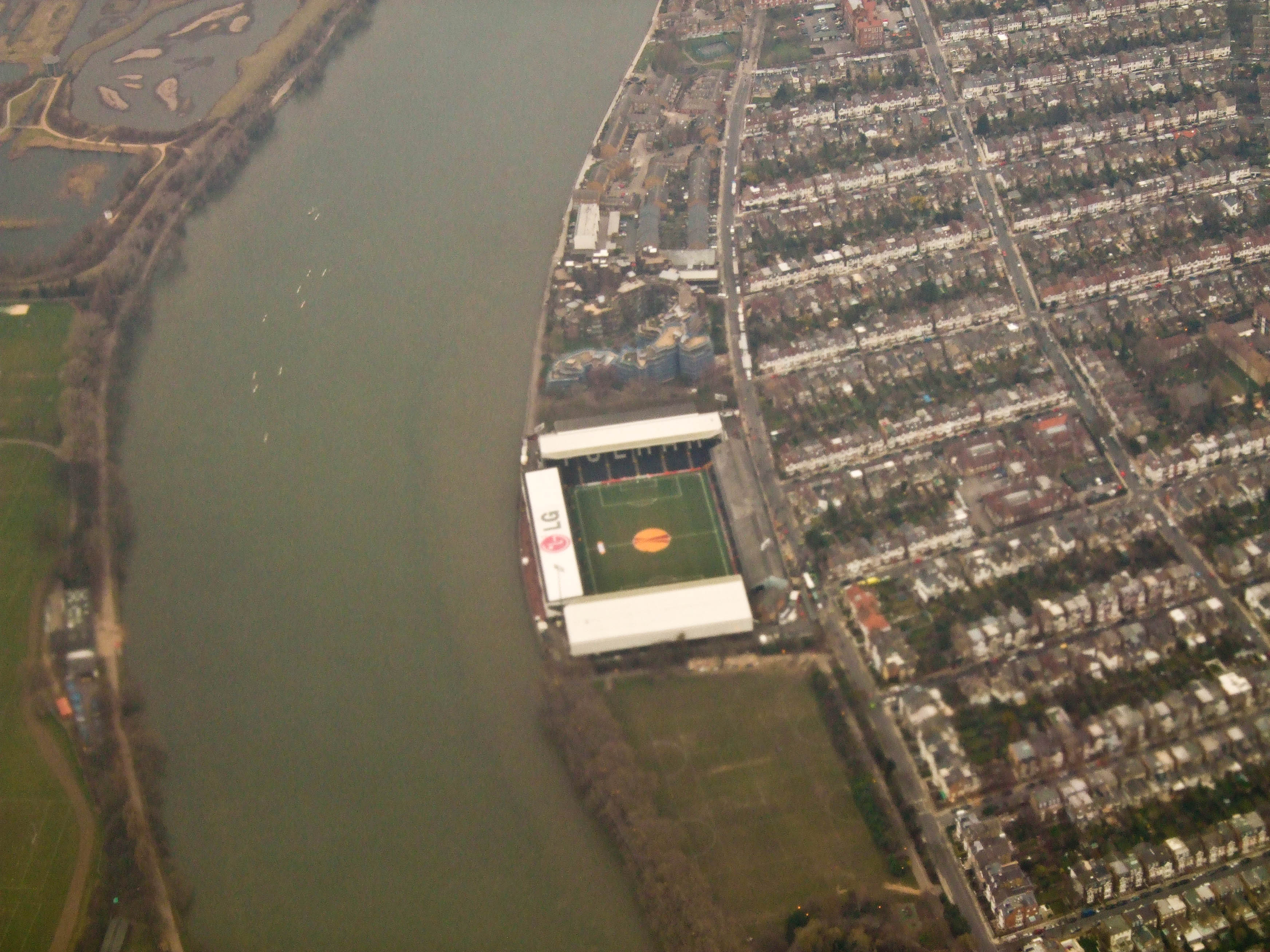
Aerial view of Craven Cottage on the banks of the River Thames as of 2010.

The original Cottage was built in 1780, by William Craven, the sixth Baron Craven and was located close to where the Johnny Haynes Stand is now. At the time, the surrounding areas were woods which once made up part of Anne Boleyn's hunting grounds.

The Cottage was lived in by Edward Bulwer-Lytton (who wrote The Last Days of Pompeii) and other somewhat notable (and moneyed) persons until it was destroyed by fire in May 1888. Following the fire, the site was abandoned. Fulham had had 8 previous grounds before settling in at Craven Cottage for good. Therefore, The Cottagers have had 12 grounds overall (including a temporary stay at Loftus Road.) Of particular note, was Ranelagh House, Fulham's palatial home from 1886 to 1888.

=== Under construction: 1894–1905 ===
The 'Rabbit Hutch' stand along Stevenage Road before Archibald Leitch's redesign in 1904-5

When representatives of Fulham first came across the land, in 1894, it was so overgrown that it took two years to be made suitable for football to be played on it. A deal was struck for the owners of the ground to carry out the work, in return for which they would receive a proportion of the gate receipts.

The first football match at which there were any gate receipts was when Fulham played against Minerva in the Middlesex Senior Cup, on 10 October 1896. The ground's first stand was built shortly after. Described as looking like an "orange box", it consisted of four wooden structures each holding some 250 seats, and later was affectionately nicknamed the "rabbit hutch".

In 1904 London County Council became concerned with the level of safety at the ground, and tried to get it closed. A court case followed in January 1905, as a result of which Archibald Leitch, a Scottish architect who had risen to prominence after his building of the Ibrox Stadium, a few years earlier, was hired to work on the stadium. In a scheme costing £15,000 (a record for the time), he built a pavilion (the present-day 'Cottage' itself) and the Stevenage Road Stand, in his characteristic red brick style.

The stand on Stevenage Road celebrated its centenary in the 2005–2006 season and, following the death of Fulham FC's favourite son, former England captain Johnny Haynes, in a car accident in October 2005 the Stevenage Road Stand was renamed the Johnny Haynes Stand after the club sought the opinions of Fulham supporters.

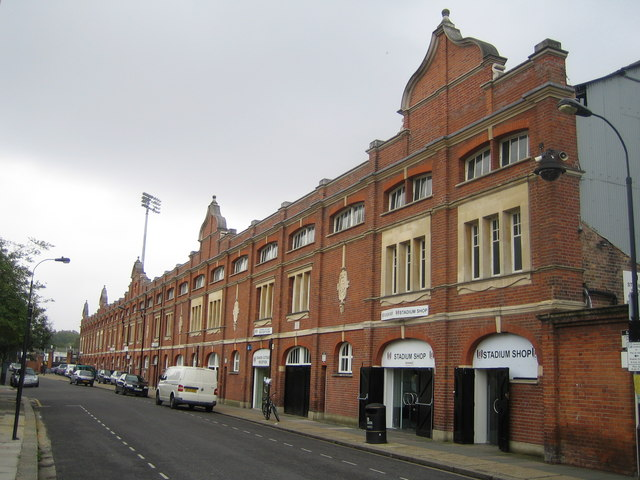
The façade of the Johnny Haynes stand

Both the Johnny Haynes Stand and Cottage remain among the finest examples of Archibald Leitch football architecture to remain in existence and both have been designated as Grade II listed buildings.

=== Establishing itself as a stadium ===
An England-Wales match was played at the ground in 1907, followed by a rugby league international between England and Australia in 1911.

One of the club's directors, Henry Norris, and his friend William Hall took over Arsenal in the early 1910s, the plan being to merge Fulham with Arsenal to form a "London superclub" at Craven Cottage. This move was largely motivated by Fulham's failure to gain promotion to the top division of English football. There were also plans for Norris to build a larger stadium on the other side of Stevenage Road, but little need after the merger idea failed. During this era, the Cottage was used for choir singing and marching bands along with other performances, and Mass.

In 1933, there were plans to demolish the ground and start again from scratch with a new 80,000 capacity stadium. These plans never materialised, mainly due to the Great Depression.

On 8 October 1938, 49,335 spectators watched Fulham play Millwall. It was the largest attendance ever at Craven Cottage and is unlikely to be bettered because the stadium is now an all-seater with room for no more than 29,700. The ground hosted several football games for the 1948 Summer Olympics and is one of the last extant facilities that did.

=== Post-World War II ===
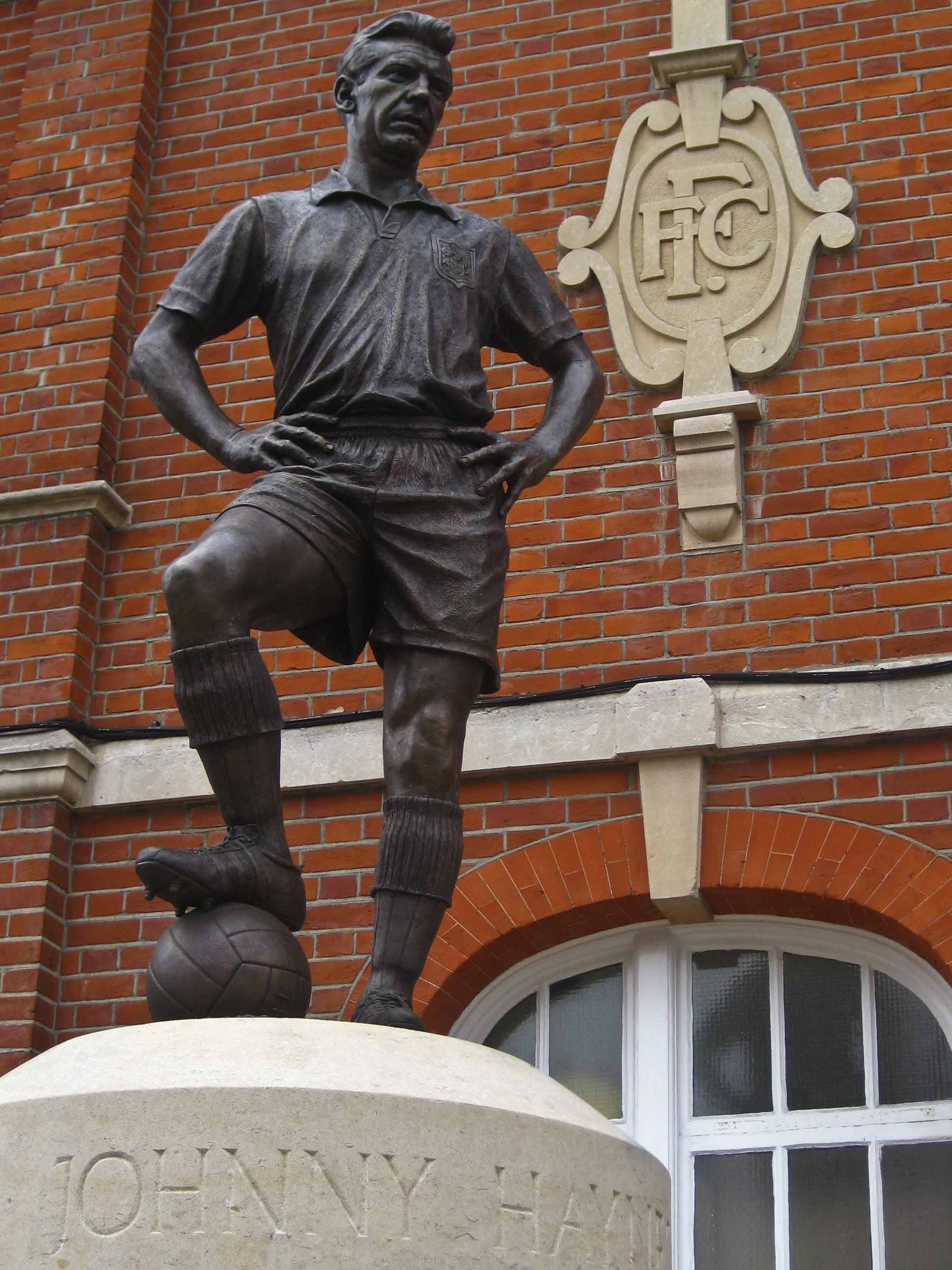
Johnny Haynes (1934–2005), Fulham's most famous player, in his classic 'hand-on-hip' pose, outside the stand named after him

It was not until after Fulham first reached the top division, in 1949, that further improvements were made to the stadium. In 1962 Fulham became the final side in the first division to erect floodlights. An electronic scoreboard was installed on the Riverside Terrace at the same time and flagpoles flying the flags of all of the other first division teams were flown from them. Following the sale of Alan Mullery to Tottenham Hotspur in 1964 (for £72,500) the Hammersmith End had a roof put over it at a cost of approximately £42,500.

Although Fulham were relegated, the development of Craven Cottage continued. The Riverside terracing, infamous for the fact that fans occupying it would turn their heads annually to watch The Boat Race pass, was replaced by what was officially named the 'Eric Miller Stand', Eric Miller being a director of the club at the time. The stand, which cost £334,000 and held 4,200 seats, was opened with a friendly game against Benfica in February 1972, (which included Eusébio). Pelé was also to appear on the ground, with a friendly played against his team Santos F.C. The Miller stand brought the seated capacity up to 11,000 out of a total 40,000. Eric Miller committed suicide five years later after a political and financial scandal, and had unethical dealings with trying to move Fulham away from the Cottage. The stand is now better known as the Riverside Stand.

On Boxing Day 1963, Craven Cottage was the venue of one of the fastest hat-tricks in the history of the English football league, which was completed in less than three minutes, by Graham Leggat. This helped his Fulham team to defeat Ipswich Town 10–1 (a club record). The international record is held by Jimmy O'Connor, an Irish player who notched up his hat trick in 2 minutes 14 seconds in 1967.

Between 1980 and 1984, Fulham rugby league played their home games at the Cottage. They have since evolved into the London Crusaders, the London Broncos and Harlequins Rugby League before reverting to London Broncos ahead of the 2012 season. Craven Cottage held the team's largest ever crowd at any ground with 15,013, at a game against Wakefield Trinity on 15 February 1981.

=== Modern times ===
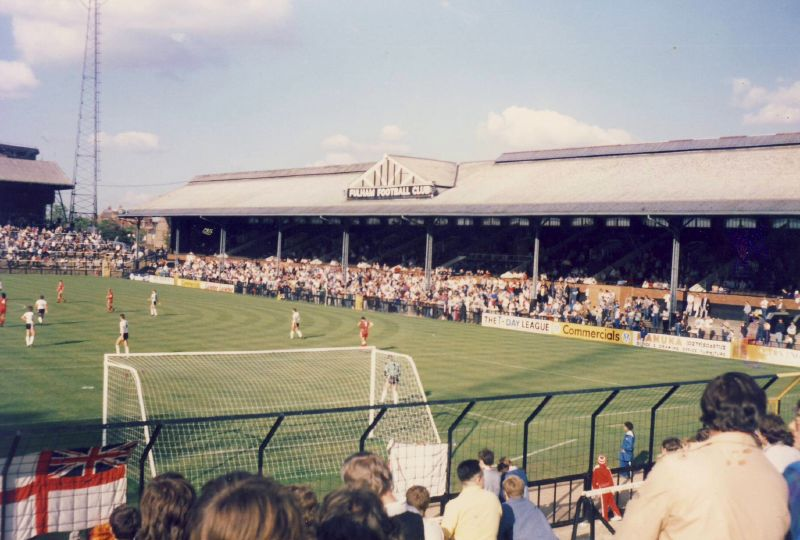
Craven Cottage before the implementation of the Taylor report.

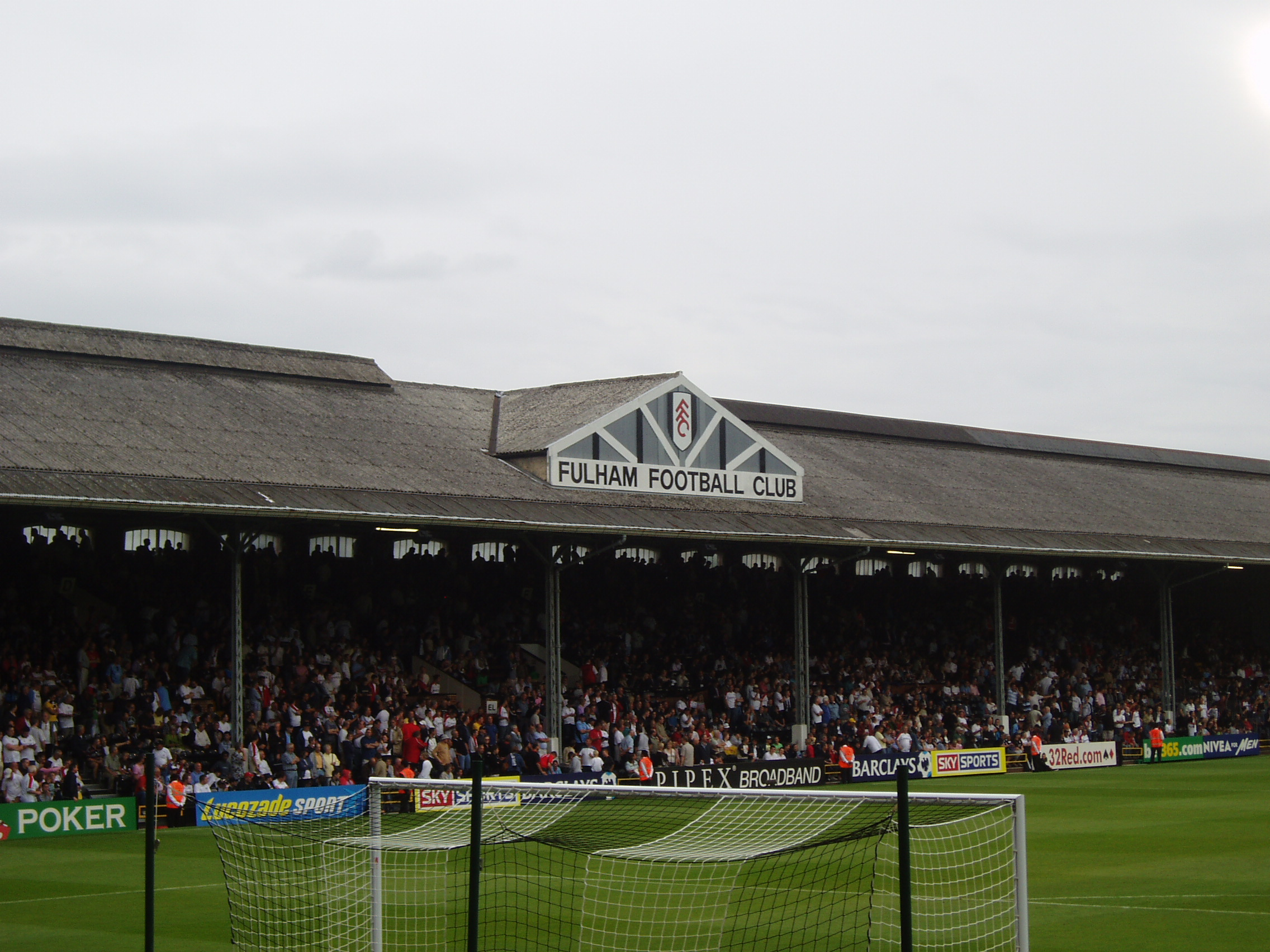
The historic triangular gable on top of the Haynes stand, one of the few extant at British grounds

When the Hillsborough disaster occurred in 1989, Fulham were in the second bottom rung of The Football League, but following the Taylor report Fulham's ambitious chairman Jimmy Hill tabled plans in 1996 for an all-seater stadium. These plans never came to fruition, partly due to local residents' pressure groups, and by the time Fulham reached the Premier League, they still had standing areas in the ground, something virtually unheard of at the time. A year remained to do something about this (teams reaching the second tier for the first time are allowed a three-year period to reach the required standards for the top two divisions), but by the time the last league game was played there, against Leicester City on 27 April 2002, no building plans had been made. Two more Intertoto Cup games were played there later that year (against FC Haka of Finland and Egaleo of Greece), and the eventual solution was to decamp to Loftus Road, home of local rivals QPR. During this time, many Fulham fans only went to away games in protest of moving from Craven Cottage. 'Back to the Cottage', later to become the 'Fulham Supporters Trust', was set up as a fans pressure group to encourage the chairman and his advisers that Craven Cottage was the only viable option for Fulham Football Club.

After one and a half seasons at Loftus Road, no work had been carried out on the Cottage. In December 2003, plans were unveiled for £8 million worth of major refurbishment work to bring it in line with Premier League requirements. With planning permission granted, work began in January 2004 in order to meet the deadline of the new season. The work proceeded as scheduled and the club were able to return to their home for the start of the 2004–05 season. Their first game in the new-look 22,000 all-seater stadium was a pre-season friendly against Watford on 10 July 2004.

The current stadium was one of the Premier League's smallest grounds at the time of Fulham's relegation at the end of the 2013–14 season (it was third-smallest, after the KC Stadium and the Liberty Stadium). Much admired for its fine architecture, the stadium has hosted some international games in recent decades, mostly including Australia. This venue is suitable for Australia because most of the country's top players are based in Europe, and West London has a significant community of expatriate Australians. Also, Greece vs. South Korea was hosted on 6 February 2007. In 2011 Brazil played Ghana, in an international friendly, months after hosting the Women's Champions League final.

Craven Cottage often hosts other events such as 5-a-side football tournaments and weddings. Some have Sunday Lunch at the Riverside restaurant or the 'Cottage Cafe' on non-match days. Craven Cottage hosted the Oxbridge Varsity Football match annually between 1991 and 2000 and again in 2003, 2006 (the same day as the 'Boat Race'), 2008, 2009, and 2014 as well as having a Soccer Aid warm-up match in 2006. The half-time entertainment includes the SW6ers (previously called The Cravenettes) which are a group of female cheerleaders. Other events have included brass bands, Travis playing, Arabic dancing, keepie uppie professionals and presentational awards. Most games also feature the 'Fulham flutter', a half-time draw; and a shoot-out competition of some kind, usually involving scoring through a 'hoop' or 'beat the goalie'. On the first home game of the season, there is a carnival where Fulham fans are encouraged to attend in black-and-white colours.

The revived Fulham F.C. Women and reserve teams occasionally play home matches at the Cottage. Other than this, they generally play at the club's training ground at Motspur Park. Craven Cottage is known by several affectionate nicknames from fans, including: The (River) Cottage, The Fortress (or Fortress Fulham), Thameside, The Friendly Confines, SW6, Lord of the Banks, The House of Hope, The Pavilion of Perfection, The 'True' Fulham Palace and The Palatial Home. The Thames at the banks of the Cottage is often referred to as 'Old Father' or The River of Dreams.

The most accessible route to the ground is to walk through Bishops Park from Putney Bridge (the nearest Underground station), often known as 'The Green Mile' by Fulham fans (as it is roughly a mile walk through pleasant greenery). In 2016 The Daily Telegraph ranked the Cottage 9th out of 54 grounds to hold Premier League football.

=== Plans ===
On 27 July 2012, Fulham FC were granted permission to redevelop the Riverside Stand, increasing the capacity of Craven Cottage to 30,000 seats. Beforehand various rumours arose including plans to return to ground-sharing with QPR in a new 40,000 seater White City stadium, although these now appear firmly on hold with the construction of the Westfield shopping centre on the proposed site. The board seem to have moved away from their ambition to make Fulham the "Manchester United of the south" as it became clear how expensive such a plan would be. With large spaces of land at a premium in south-west London, Fulham appear to be committed to a gradual increase of the ground's capacity often during the summer between seasons. The capacity of Craven Cottage has been increased during summers for instance in 2008 with a small increase in the capacity of the Hammersmith End. Fulham previously announced in 2007 that they are planning to increase the capacity of Craven Cottage by 4,000 seats, but this is yet to be implemented. There were also proposals for a bridge to span the Thames, for a redeveloped Riverside stand and a museum.

More substantial plans arose in October 2011 with the 'Fulham Forever' campaign. With Mohamed Al-Fayed selling Harrods department store for £1.5 billion in May 2010 a detailed plan emerged in the Riverside Stand as the only viable area for expansion. The scheme involved the demolition of the back of the Riverside Stand with a new tier of seating added on top of the current one and a row of corporate boxes; bringing Craven Cottage up to 30,000 capacity. Taking into account local residents, the proposal would: reopen the riverside walk; light pollution would be reduced with the removal of floodlight masts; new access points would make match-day crowds more manageable; and the new stand would be respectful in design to its position on the River Thames. Buckingham Group Contracting were chosen in March 2013 as the construction company for the project. In May 2019, the club confirmed that work on the new Riverside Stand would commence in the summer of 2019. During the 2019–20, 2020–21 and 2021–22 seasons, the ground's capacity was temporarily reduced to 19,000. The club announced on 17 March 2022 that the lower tier of the Riverside Stand would be open for the 2022–23 season for over 2,000 supporters, with season tickets going on sale later that month.

== The ground ==
=== Hammersmith End ===
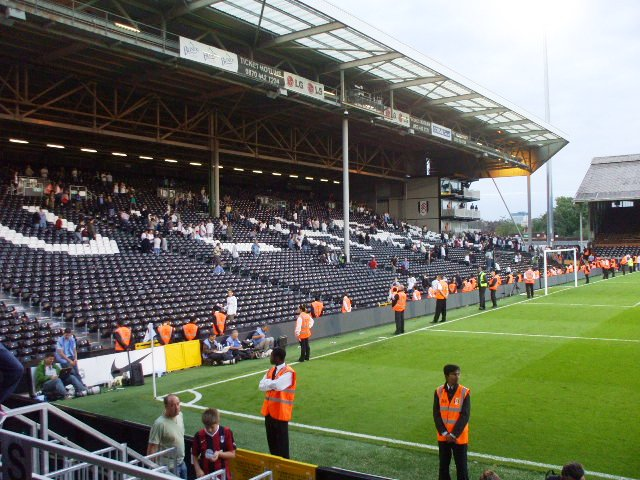
The Hammersmith End

The Hammersmith End is the northernmost stand in the ground, the closest to Hammersmith. The roofing was financed through the sale of Alan Mullery to Tottenham Hotspur F.C. It is traditionally the "home" end where the more vocal Fulham fans sit, and many stand during games at the back rows of the stand. If Fulham win the toss, they usually choose to play towards the Hammersmith End in the second half. The hardcore fans tend to sit (or rather stand) in the back half of the Hammersmith End, plus the entire Block H5 (known as 'H Block' to the faithful). The stand had terracing until the reopening of the ground in 2004, when it was replaced with seating in order to comply with league rules following the Taylor Report.

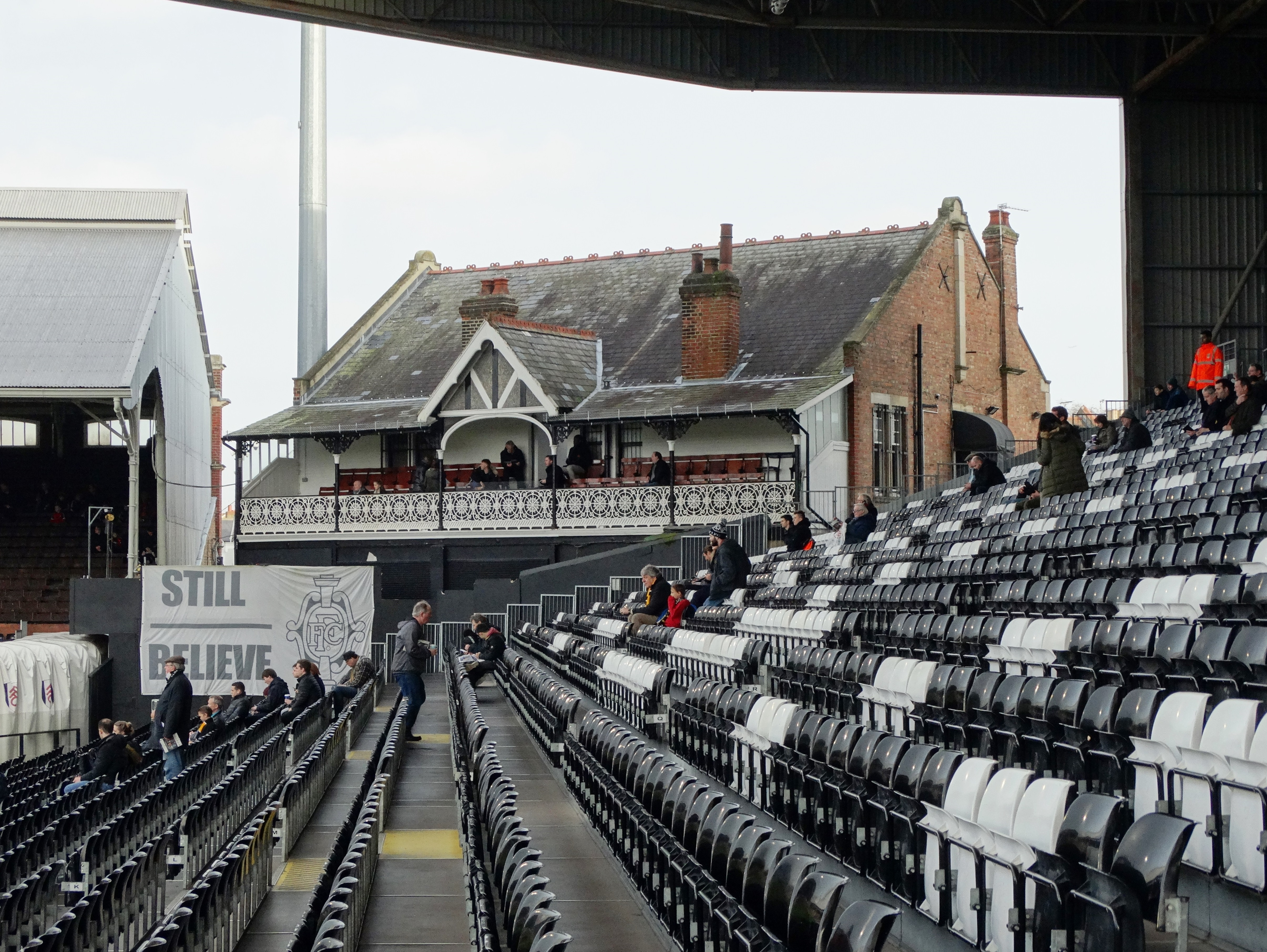
The Cottage section of the Putney End in 2016

=== Putney End ===
The Putney End is the southernmost stand in the ground, nearest to Putney and backing onto Bishops Park. This stand hosts home and away fans, separated by stewards, with away fans usually allocated blocks P5 and P6. Flags of every nationality in the Fulham squad were hung from the roofing, although they were removed after the 2006–07 season commenced and there is now an electronic scoreboard in place. There is a plane tree in the corner by the river.

=== Riverside Stand ===
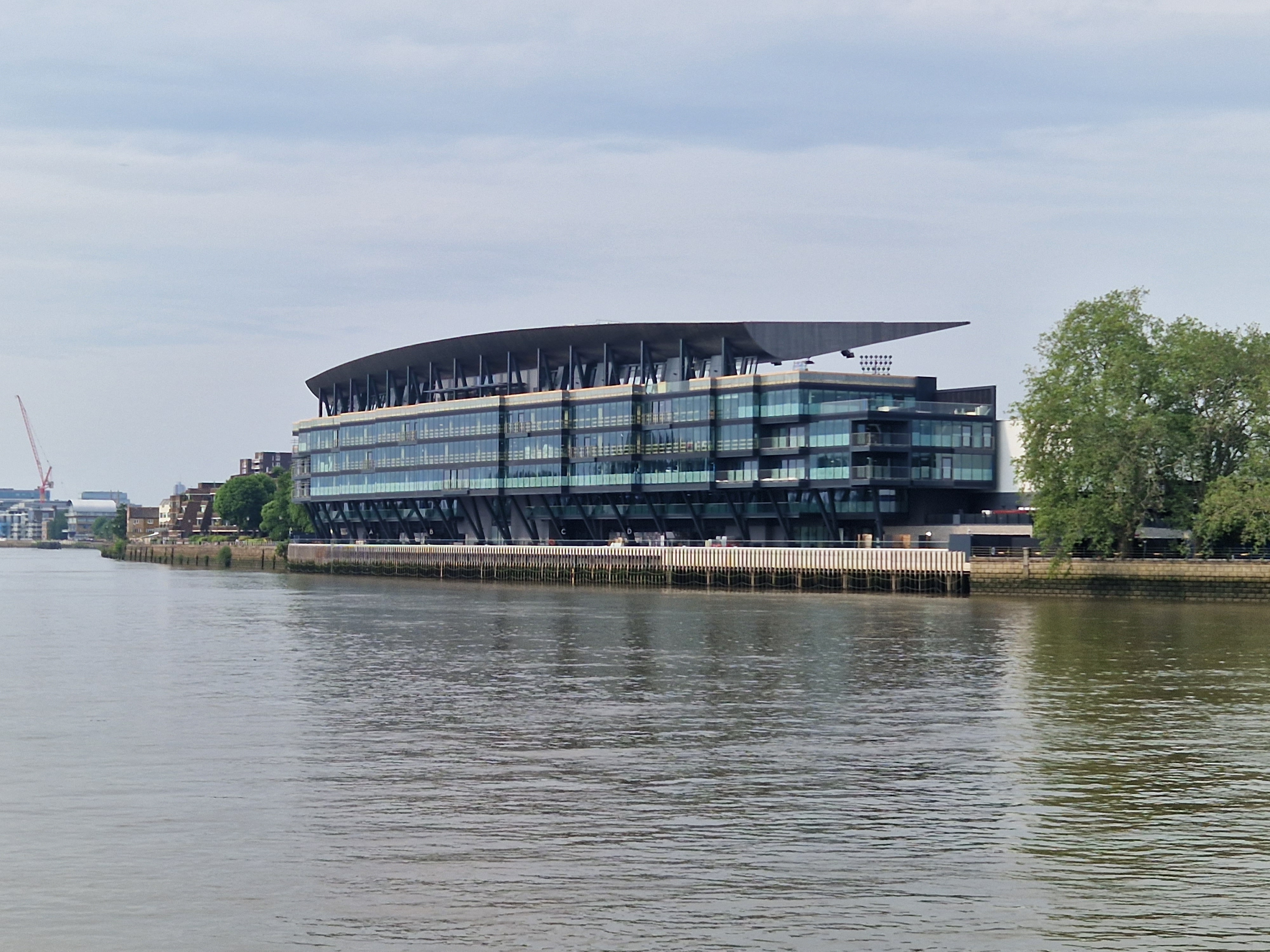
Riverside Stand in 2023, seen from the River Thames

The Riverside was originally terracing that backed onto the Thames. It also featured large advertising hoardings above the fans. In 1971–72, an all-seater stand was built, originally known as the Riverside Stand (the name was confirmed in the Fulham v Carlisle United programme on 4 December 1971). Its hard lines and metallic and concrete finish are in stark contrast to the Johnny Haynes stand opposite. The stand was opened for a friendly against S.L. Benfica, who included Eusébio in the team. In the Fulham v Burnley programme on 4 October 1977, it was revealed that the stand would be renamed the Eric Miller Stand, following the recent death of the former vice-chairman. It is sometimes incorrectly stated that, contrary to the above, the name of the stand was changed from the Eric Miller Stand to The Riverside Stand after the discovery of Miller's suicide. He had been under investigation for fraud and embezzlement. The name of the stand actually reverted to "Riverside Stand" in the 1990s.

The Riverside Stand backs onto the River Thames and is elevated above pitch level, unlike the other three stands. It contained corporate hospitality seating alongside Fulham fans. Jimmy Hill once referred to the Riverside being "a bit like the London Palladium" as Blocks V & W (the middle section) were often filled with the rich and famous (including often Al-Fayed). There were then several Harrods advertising hoardings. Above the advertising hoardings was the gantry, for the press and cameras. Tickets in this area were often the easiest to buy, not surprisingly they were also some of the more expensive. The Hammersmith End is to its left, the Putney End to its right and opposite is the Johnny Haynes Stand.

During the 1970s, Craven Cottage flooded, with water flowing in from the riverside. The stand housed the George Cohen restaurant, while on non-match days there was the Cottage Cafe, located near to the Cottage itself. (The River Café is also located nearby). Under Tommy Trinder's chairmanship in the 60s, flags of all other teams in the Division 1 were proudly flown along the Thames. However, when Fulham were relegated in 1968, Trinder decided not to change the flags as "Fulham won't be in this division next season". True to Trinder's prophecy, Fulham were relegated again. The roof of the stand had been used by sponsors, with VisitFlorida advertising in this way, and Pipex.com, FxPro, Lee Cooper Jeans and LG having previously done so.

After the 2019–20 season, the stand was demolished and rebuilt. Upon completion, the capacity of the ground will increase to around 29,600. On 26 November 2019, the Chairman Shahid Khan announced that the new development will be known as Fulham Pier, a destination venue outside of match-day use. Several issues postponed completion from 2021 to 2024.

As of February 2025 the stand fit out is still being completed.

=== Johnny Haynes Stand ===
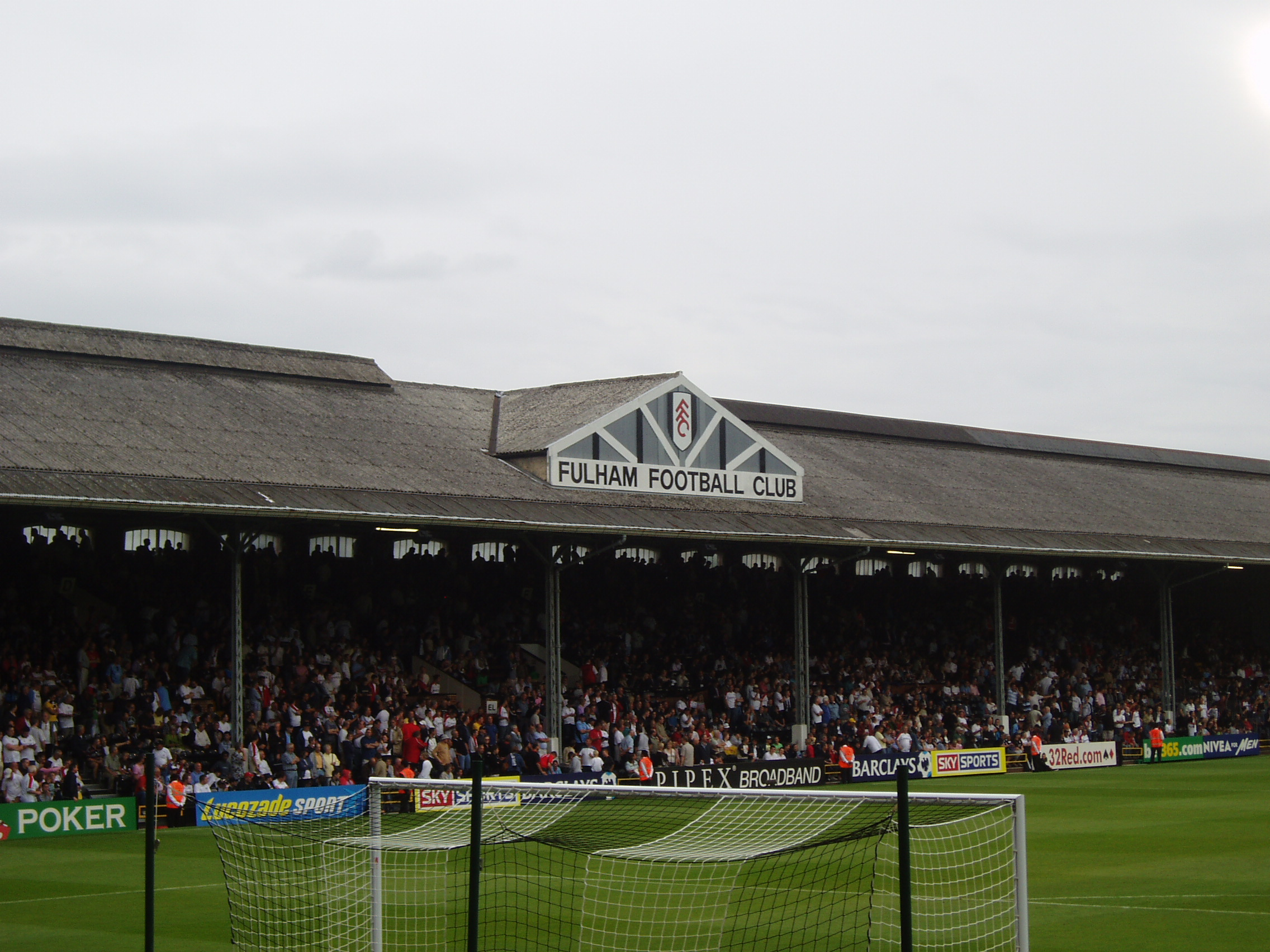
The Johnny Haynes stand at Craven Cottage, is a Grade II listed building.

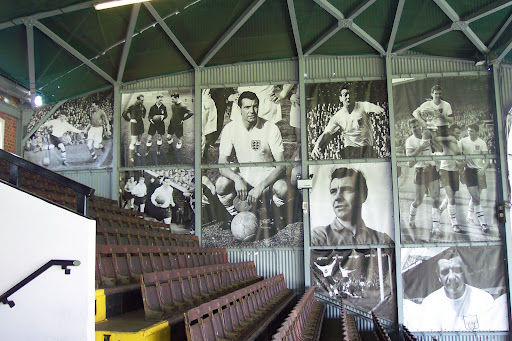
Internal look of the stand, with a montage of Johnny Haynes

Originally called the Stevenage Road Stand, after the road it backs onto, the Johnny Haynes stand is the oldest remaining football stand in the Football League and professional football, originally constructed in 1905, and is a Grade II listed building. Designed by Archibald Leitch, the stand contains the ticket office and club shop and features original 'Bennet' wooden seating. Following his death in 2005, the stand was renamed after former player Johnny Haynes.

The exterior facing Stevenage Road has a brick façade and features the club's old emblem in the artwork. Decorative pillars show the club's foundation date as 1880 though this is thought to be incorrect. Also, a special stone to commemorate the supporters' fund-raising group Fulham 2000, and The Cottagers' return to Craven Cottage, was engraved on the façade. The family enclosures are located in the two corners of the stand, one nearest to the Hammersmith End and one nearest to the Putney End. The front of the stand now contains plastic seating, but originally was a standing area. Children were often placed at the front of this enclosure and the area had a distinctive white picket fence to keep fans off the pitch up until the 1970s.

=== The Pavilion ===
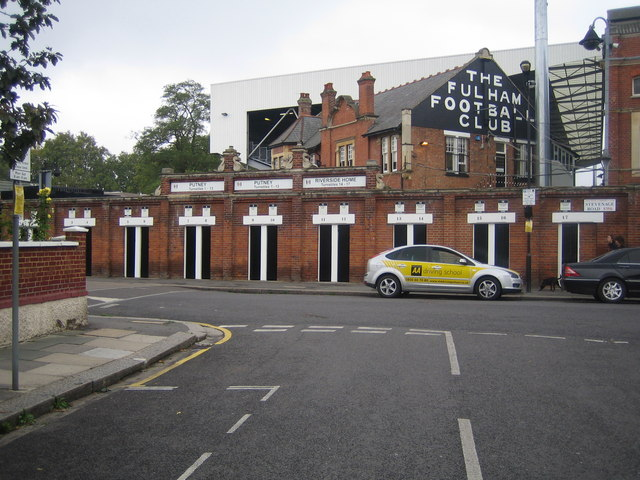
The Pavilion from outside the stadium

The Cottage Pavilion dates back to 1905 along with the Johnny Haynes Stand, built by renowned football architect Archibald Leitch. Besides being the changing rooms, the Cottage (also called The Clubhouse) is traditionally used by the players' families and friends who sit on the balcony to watch the game. In the past, board meetings used to be held in The Cottage itself as well. There is a large tapestry draped from the Cottage which says "Still Believe". It encapsulates the moment, when fans facing defeat against Hamburg SV in the Europa League semi-final roused the players with the chant of "Stand up if you still believe". In the three other corners of the ground there are what have been described as large 'filing cabinets', which are corporate boxes on three levels, but the box on the other side of the Putney End has been removed due to the redevelopment of the Riverside.

== Details ==
=== Records ===
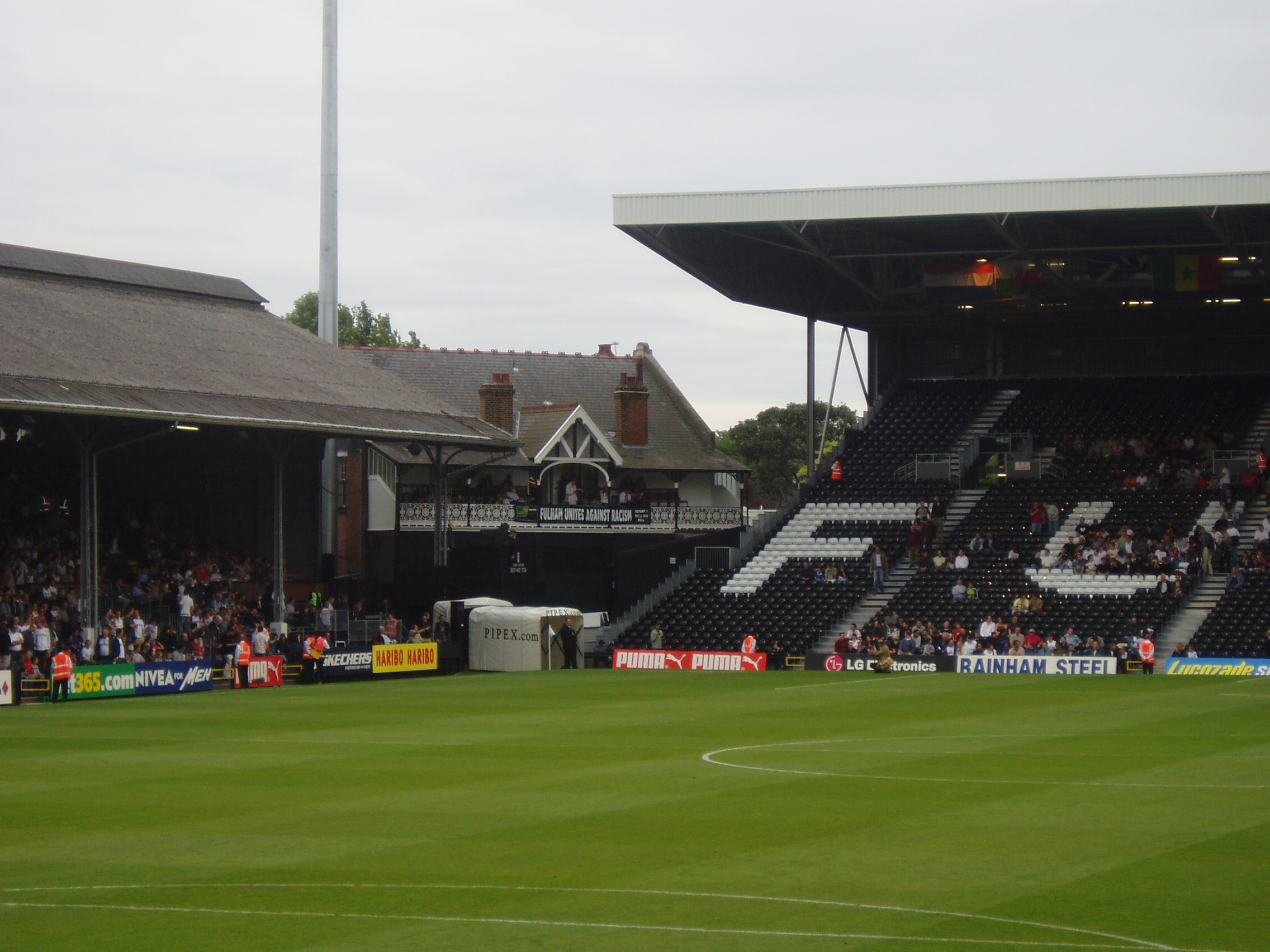
The Cottage Pavilion dates back to 1905

- Record attendance: 49,335 v. Millwall, 8 October 1938 – Division Two
- Record modern seated attendance: 27,770 v. Liverpool, 6 April 2025 – Premier League

=== All-time attendance ===
- Total attendance: 31,234,275 (correct up to January 2013)
- Average total attendance: 15,759 (ranked 31 of 130 English club teams in history as of January 2013)

== International matches ==
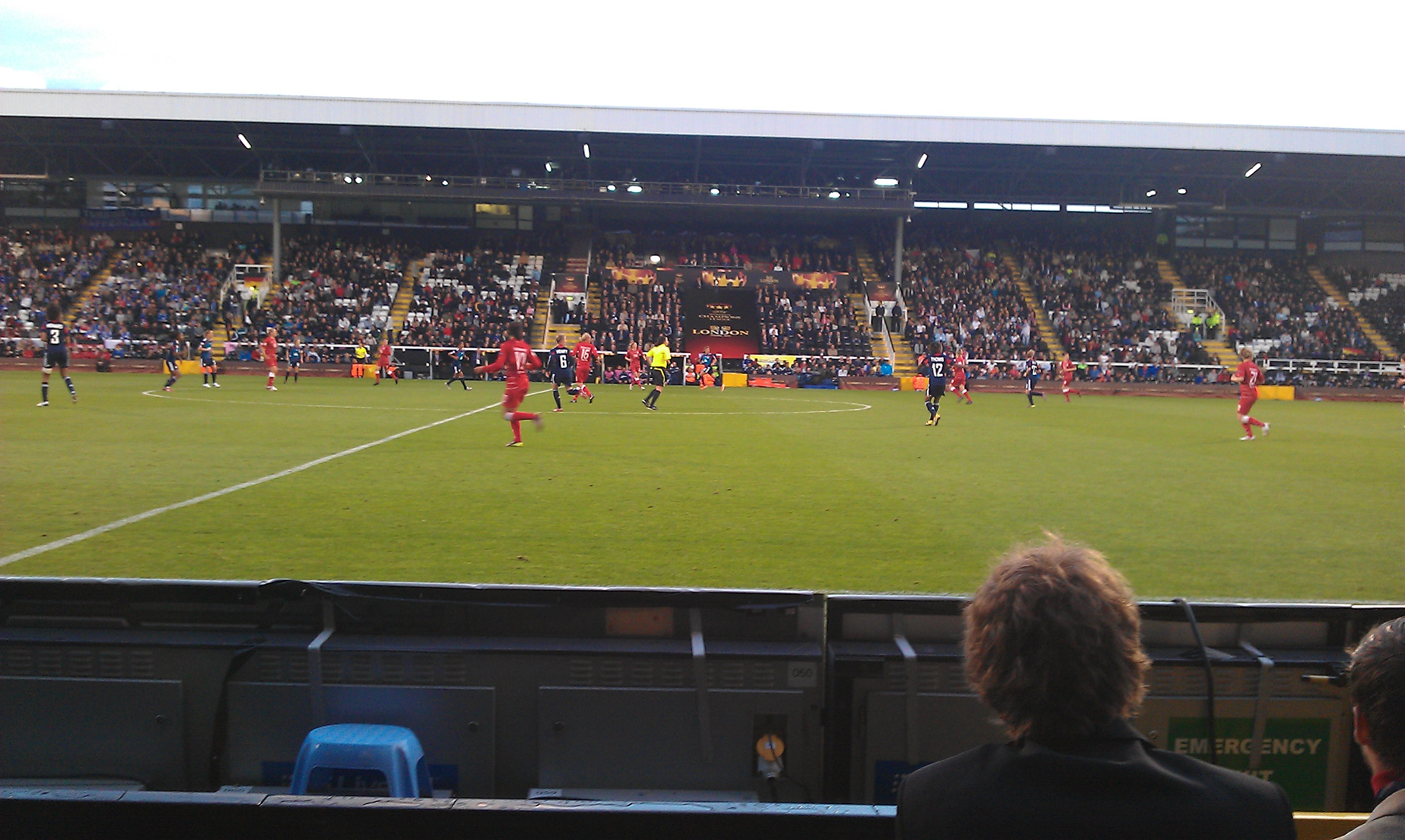
View of the Riverside during the 2011 UEFA Women's Champions League Final

Craven Cottage hosted the Northern Ireland versus Cyprus 1974 World Cup Qualifier on 8 May 1973, a match moved from Belfast due to The Troubles. Northern Ireland won 3–0, Sammy Morgan and a Trevor Anderson brace concluded the scoring in the first half.

On 22 February 2000, the stadium hosted England's under 21s international friendly against Argentina's under 21s team. The hosts won 1–0 with Lee Hendrie's sixty seventh-minute goal with 15,747 in attendance.

In recent years, Craven Cottage has hosted several International Friendly matches, including the Ireland national team who played Colombia and Nigeria there in May 2008 and May 2009 respectively and Oman in 2012. The South Korea national football team have also used the ground thrice in recent years for international friendlies, first against Greece in February 2007 second against Serbia in November 2009, and then against Croatia in February 2013. On 17 November 2007, Australia defeated Nigeria 1–0 in an international friendly at Craven Cottage.

On 26 May 2011, Craven Cottage hosted the game of 2011 UEFA Women's Champions League Final between Lyon and Potsdam. In September 2011, a friendly between Ghana and Brazil was also held at Craven Cottage. On 15 October 2013, Australia defeated Canada 3–0 at Craven Cottage. On 28 May 2014, Scotland played out a 2–2 draw with a Nigerian team who had qualified for the 2014 World Cup Finals.

On 27 March 2018, Australia played host to Colombia in the international friendlies. The match ended 0–0, with both teams having qualified for the 2018 World Cup Finals in Russia.

=== Other ===
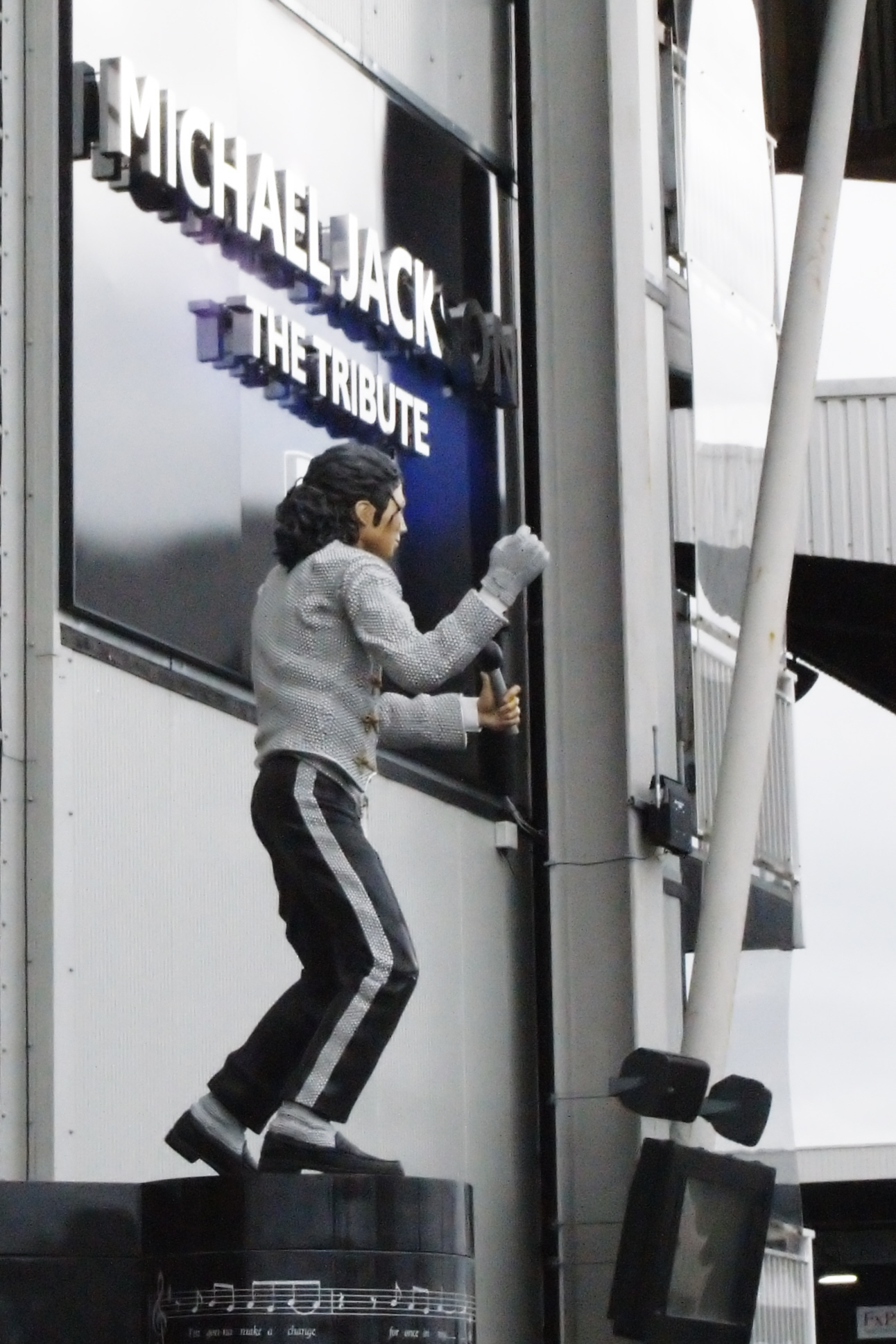
Michael Jackson statue at Craven Cottage

- Fulham RLFC, now London Broncos, played at Craven Cottage between 1980 and 1984, hosting their largest attendance of 15,013. The ground has also hosted Oxbridge varsity matches in rugby and football.
- The ground has hosted the most Australia national team matches outside of Australia and was one of the pioneers in hosting (neutral) international friendlies.
- Fulham were the last team to have standing accommodation in the Premier League, as Craven Cottage included terraces in the 2001–02 season – eight years after the Taylor Report outlawed terraces at this level.
- The original Craven Cottage site was covered in woodlands. One plane tree survives today in a corner of the Putney End, the sole tree to be found in any British senior football stadium.
- On 3 April 2011, Fulham unveiled a statue of Michael Jackson inside the stadium before its match with Blackpool. The singer was not a Fulham fan and had no interest in football, but attended a Fulham match once as a friend of club chairman Mohamed Al-Fayed, who commissioned the statue. In 2013, Al-Fayed stated that the statue would be moved to a different property he owned, though it was eventually moved to the National Football Museum in Manchester in 2014. The statue was removed from public display at that museum in March 2019, likely due to sexual abuse allegations made in the Channel 4/HBO documentary Leaving Neverland, which had aired days before.
- On 8 August 2016, the 2016 Saudi Super Cup was played. Al-Hilal lost 4–3 on penalties to Al-Ahli. The match had no added extra time. It ended 1–1 at 90 minutes.
- In October 2023, Ashwater Press (Ken Coton Martin Plumb) published a book Craven Cottage – 250 years which charts the history of the site from 1777 and the first Craven Cottage with its fifteen owners, to the present day.

== See also ==
- Fulham RLFC

Preceded by Coliseum Alfonso Pérez; Getafe	UEFA Women's Champions League; Final venue 2011	Succeeded by Olympiastadion; Munich
