= MJ Gallery at Ponte 16 =

Chinese art gallery

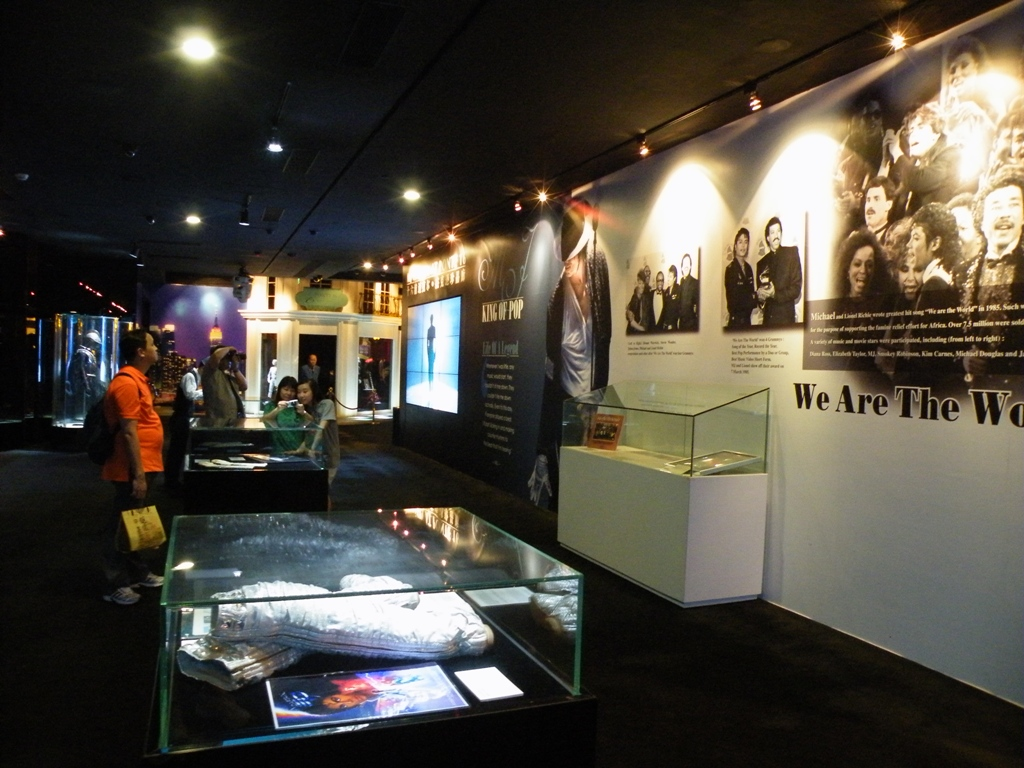
- Entrance of the MJ Gallery at Ponte 16

- Location of the MJ Gallery at Ponte 16
- Established: Feb 1, 2010
- Location: 2ºandar, Ponte 16, Ponte 12A - 20, Rua das Lorchas e Rua do Visconde Paço de Arcos, Macau, China
- Coordinates: 22.19688°N 113.536°E
- Visitors: 300-400/day
- Website: MJ Gallery

MJ Gallery at Ponte 16 (MJ Gallery, simplified Chinese: 十六浦米高积逊珍品廊; traditional Chinese: 十六浦米高積遜珍品廊) is an art gallery located on the second floor of the Ponte 16, Ponte 12A - 20, Rua das Lorchas e Rua do Visconde Paço de Arcos, Macau, China. It is the first Michael Jackson-themed gallery in Asia, and the second permanent exhibition venue in the world to exhibit artifacts from the life and work of Michael Jackson.

== History ==
Hoffman Ma Ho Man, the executive director and deputy chairman of Success Universe Group Limited, began a collection of Michael Jackson memorabilia when he spent $350,000 USD at Julien's Auctions on November 22, 2009, in Times Square, New York City. on a crystal glove that Jackson wore in 1983 during a televised performance as part of the 25th anniversary of Motown.

In addition, he purchased ten other items: including a platinum music recording sales certification by the Recording Industry Association of America, which is signed by Jackson. There were more than 40 Jackson-related items in the auction.

MJ Gallery at Ponte 16

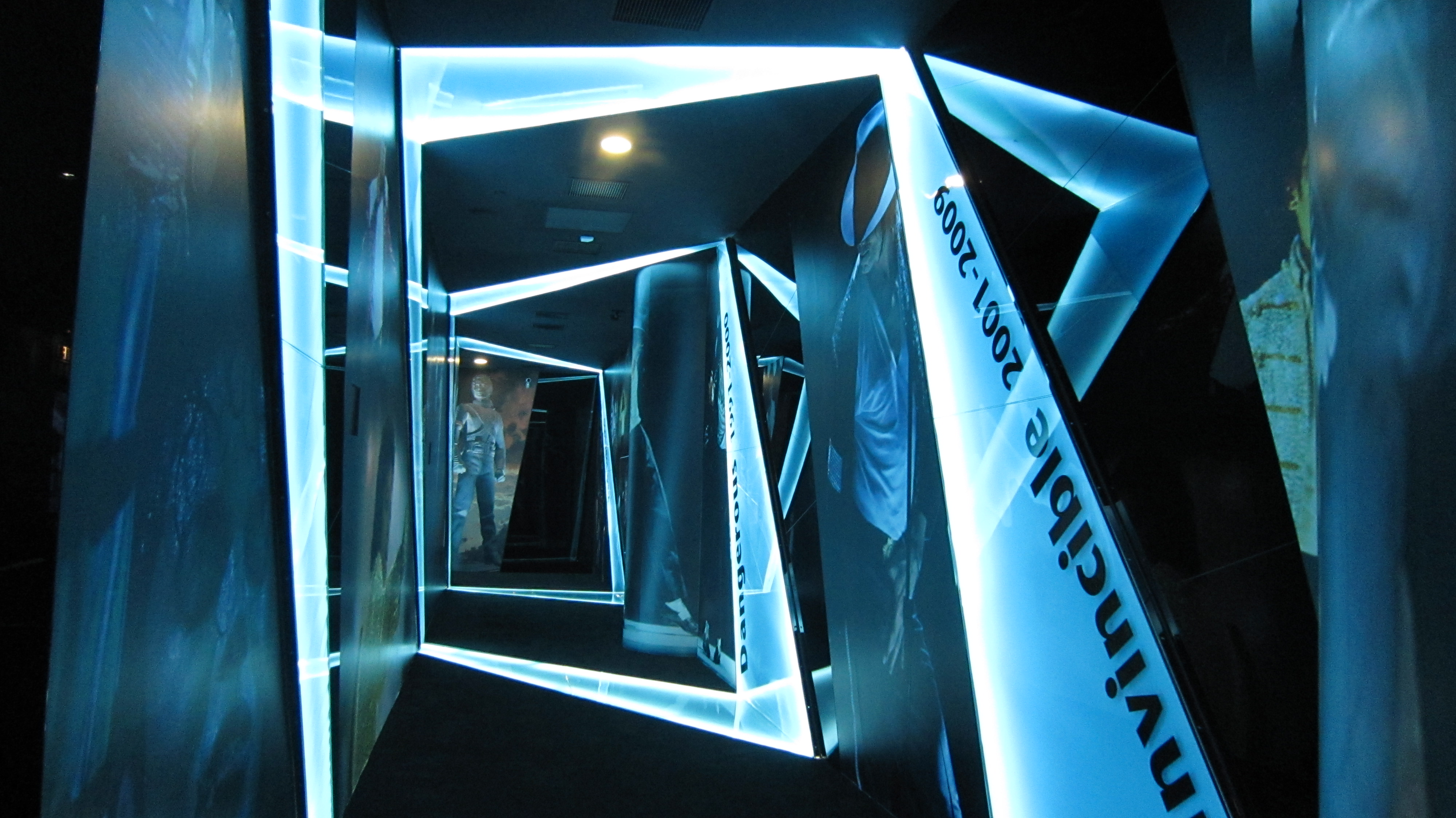
Time Tunnel

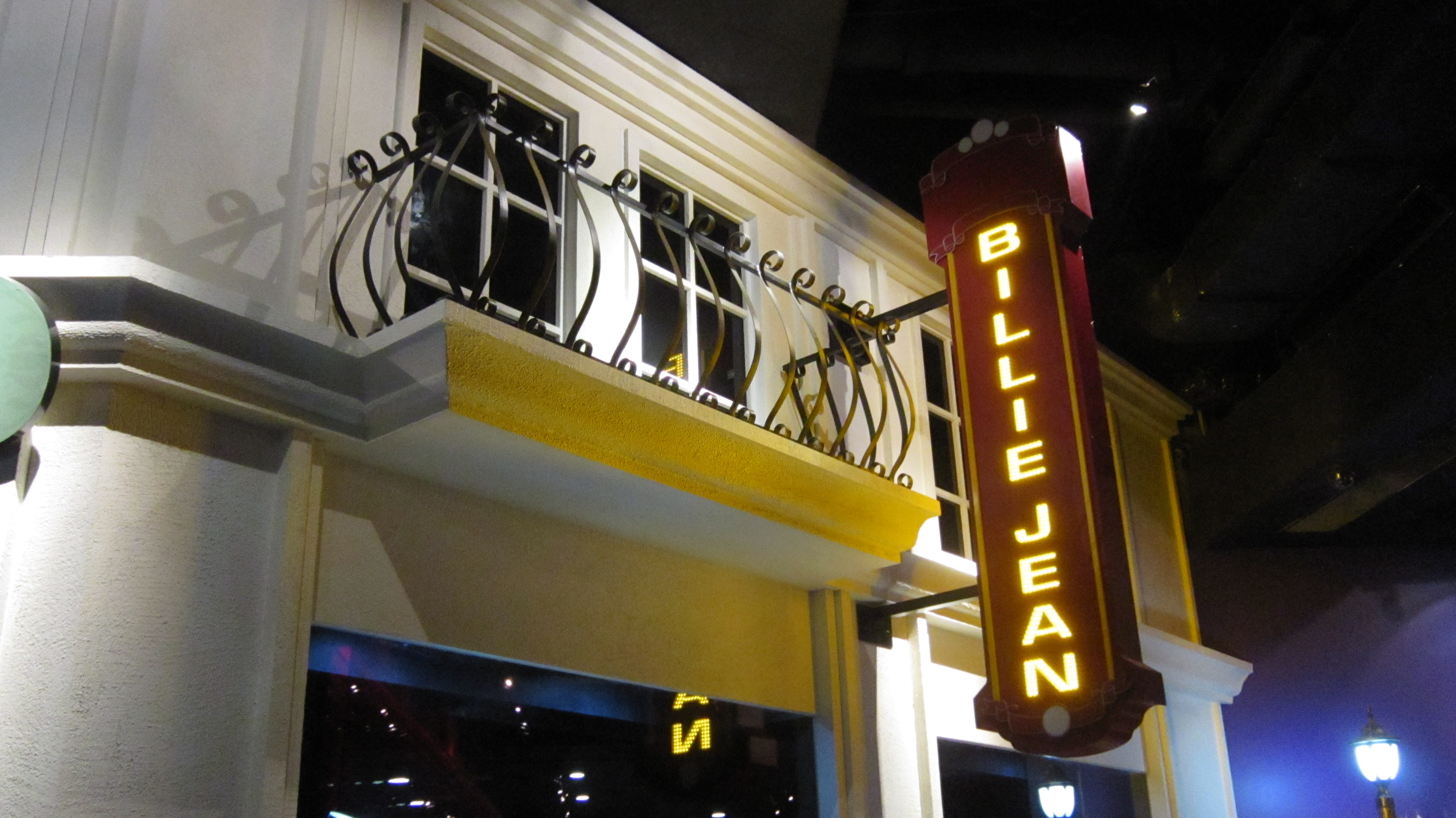
Scenery of Billie Jean

== The MJ Gallery facilities ==
The MJ Gallery covers more than 4,000 square meters and accommodates approximately 200 people per hour.

It is divided into four sections: Time Tunnel, Main Exhibition Hall, Billie Jean Setting, and the Ponte 16 Gift Gallery.

- Time Tunnel (時光隧道): features "MJ, The King of Pop" at the entrance, with Michael Jackson and the Jackson 5 as the first stop in Michael Jackson's biography.
- Main Exhibition Hall (主要展區): features Neverland Ranch, "We Are the World", and Thriller artworks and album materials.
- Billie Jean Setting (Billie Jean佈景): features scenes from the music video "Thriller, including CD covers of Michael Jackson albums, and his suit from Men in Black II .
- Ponte 16 Gift Gallery (十六浦禮品廊): Offers Michael Jackson-themed gifts and souvenirs.
