= Lin Ma Hang =

Village in Hong Kong

Coordinates: 22.551265°N 114.182689°E

- Traditional Chinese: 蓮麻坑
- Cantonese Yale: lìhn màh hāang
Transcriptions
Standard Mandarin
- Hanyu Pinyin: Lián má kēng
Yue: Cantonese
- Yale Romanization: lìhn màh hāang
- Jyutping: lin4 maa4 haang1

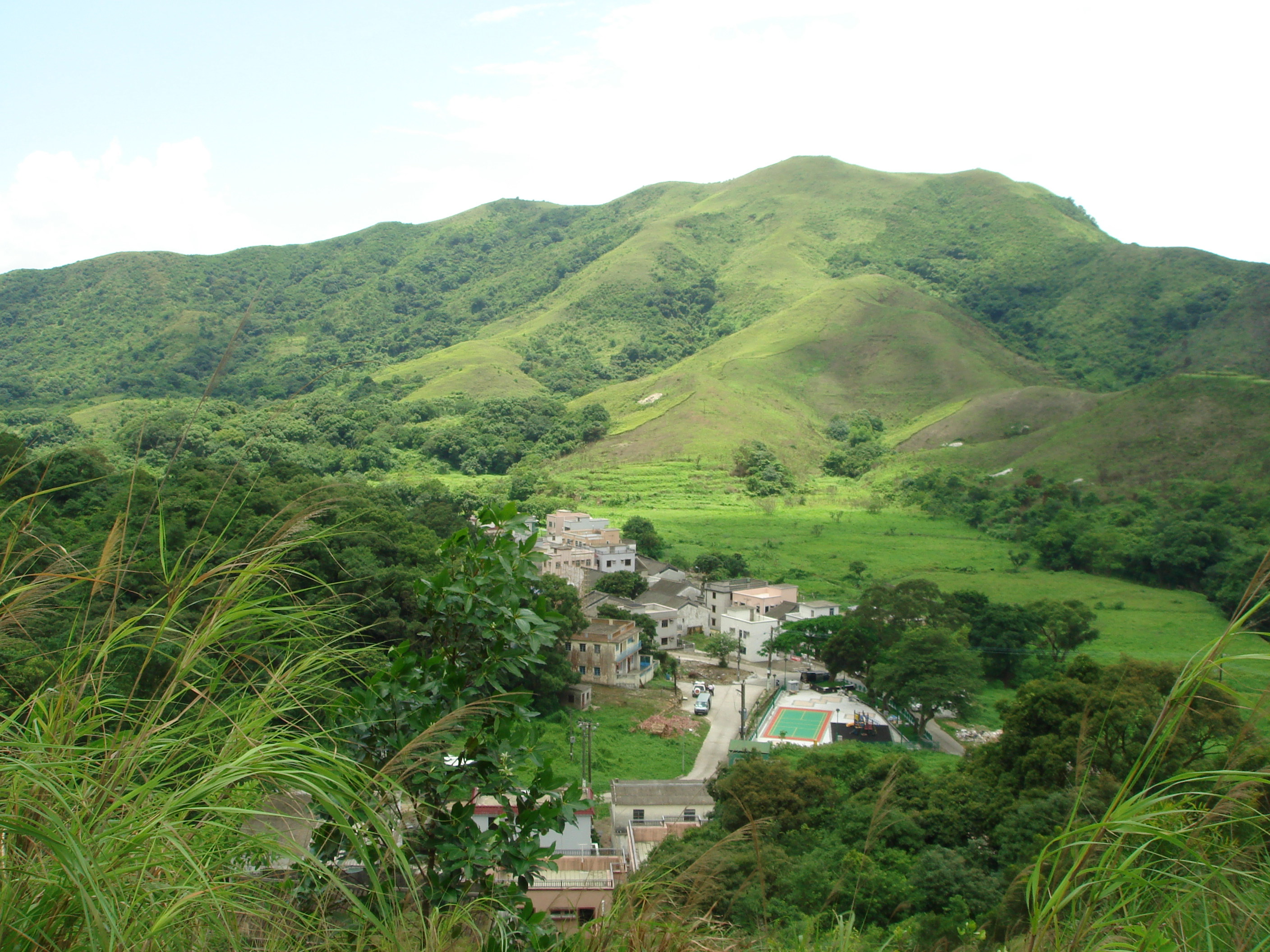
Lin Ma Hang.

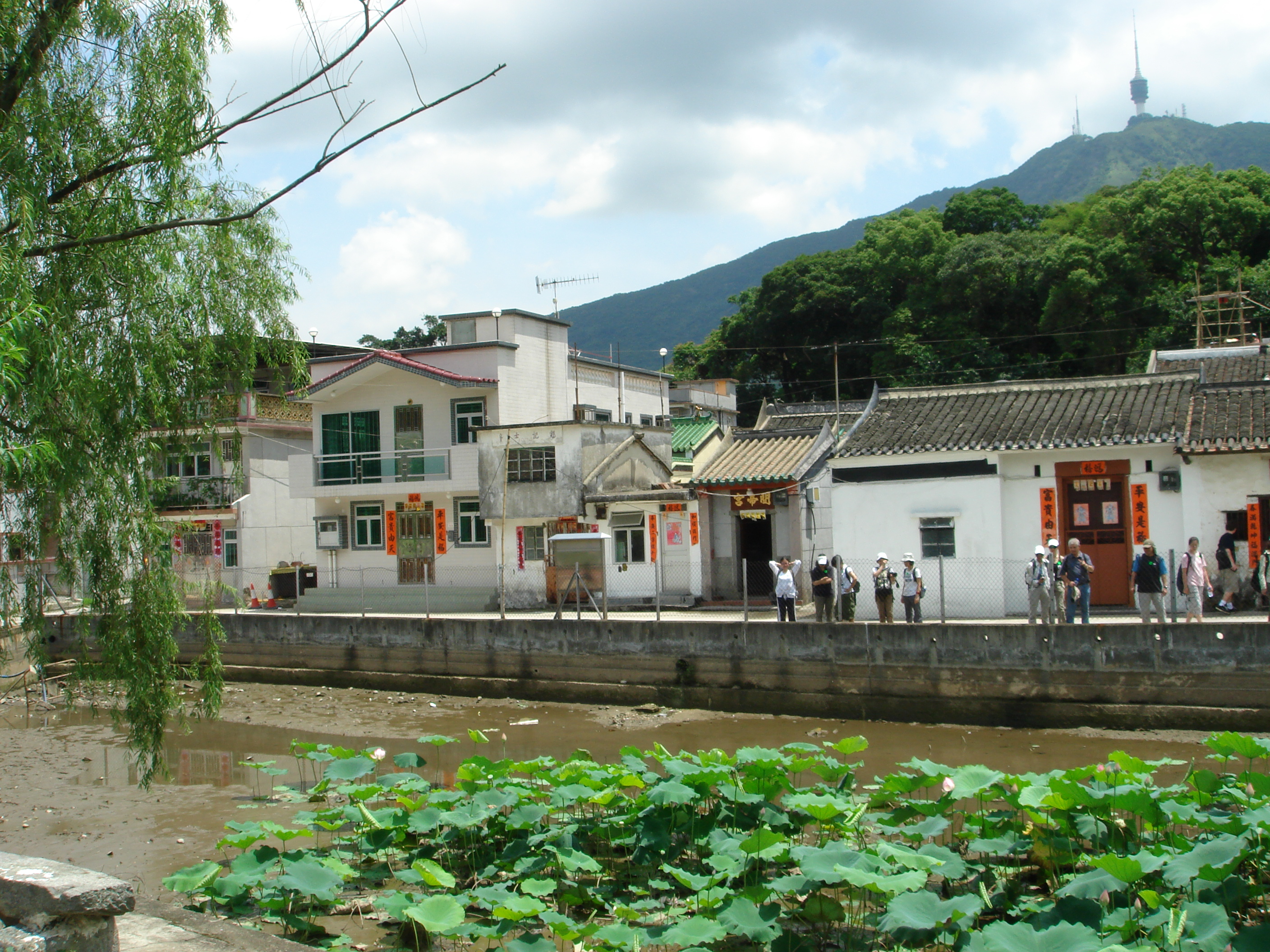
Lin Ma Hang with Wutongshan of Shenzhen in the background.

Lin Ma Hang (Chinese: 蓮麻坑) is a village in the Sha Tau Kok area of Hong Kong and is situated north of the New Territories, next to the Shenzhen river, east of Heung Yuen Wai and west of Hung Fa Leng.

== Administration ==
Lin Ma Hang is a recognized village under the New Territories Small House Policy. It is one of the villages represented within the Ta Kwu Ling District Rural Committee. For electoral purposes, Lin Ma Hang is part of the Sha Ta constituency, which is currently represented by Ko Wai-kei.

== History ==
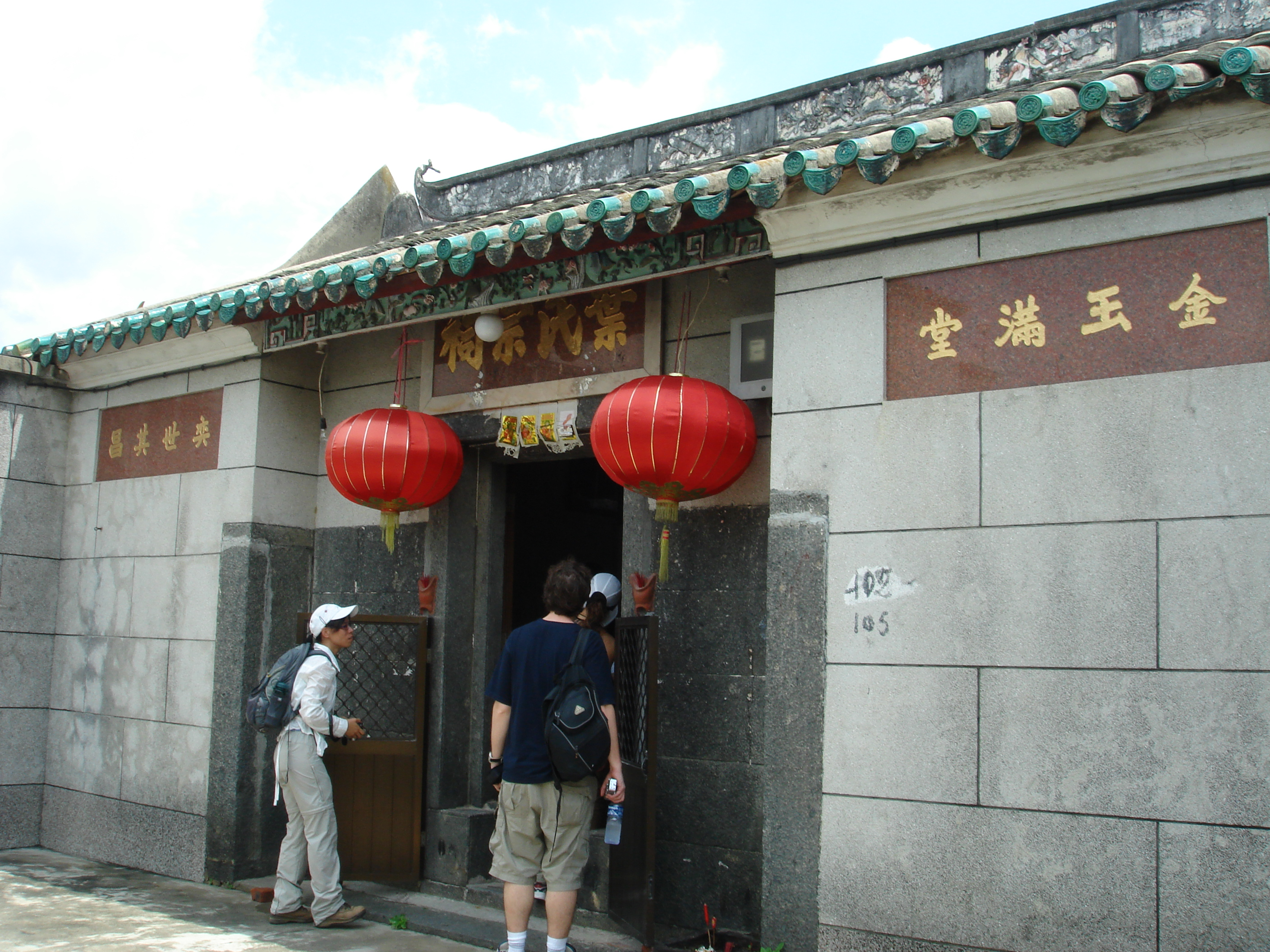
Ip Ancestral Hall.

People originated in the village are the Yip (葉) (or Ip, Yap, Yapp), Lau (劉), Sin (冼) and Koon (官) (or Kwun). It is named after a fruit called Lin Ma (蓮麻) that can be found in the mid-level streams.

Lin Ma Hang is part of the Four Yeuk (四約; 'Four Villages Alliance'), which comprises Loi Tung, Lung Yeuk Tau, Lin Ma Hang and Tan Chuk Hang. The centre of the Alliance is the Hung Shing Temple at Hung Leng.

At the time of the 1911 census, the population of Lin Ma Hang was 516. The number of males was 199.

=== Abandoned lead mine ===
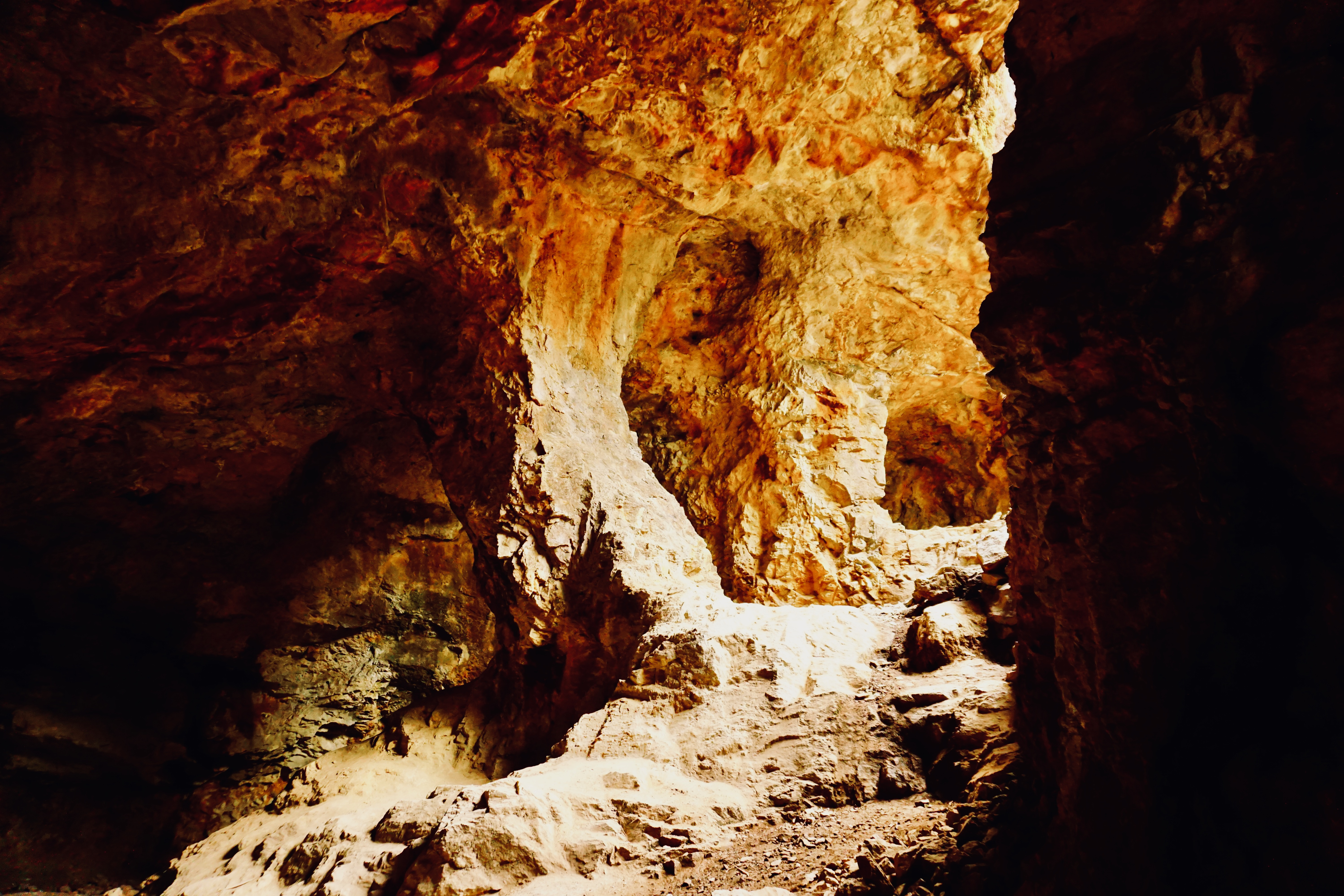
A pillar inside the Lin Ma Hang Mine

A lead mine was in operation in Lin Ma Hang starting in 1915. Pb–Zn ore was mined there. The mine operated intermittently between 1915 and 1958, producing 16,000 tonnes of lead metal and 360,000 ounces of silver. The Government rescinded the mining lease in 1962 and the mine was abandoned the same year.

== Fauna and flora ==
The abandoned lead mine now holds one of the most important bat colonies in Hong Kong, and was designated as a Site of Special Scientific Interest (SSSI) in 1994.

The Lin Ma Hang Stream was designated as a SSSI in 2008. It supports 17 species of primary freshwater fish, representing 50% of all such species native to Hong Kong.

The village is situated in the basin of the Robin's Nest (Chinese: 紅花嶺) which is famous for its abundance in "Hanging Bell Flowers" (吊鐘花).

== Building heritage ==
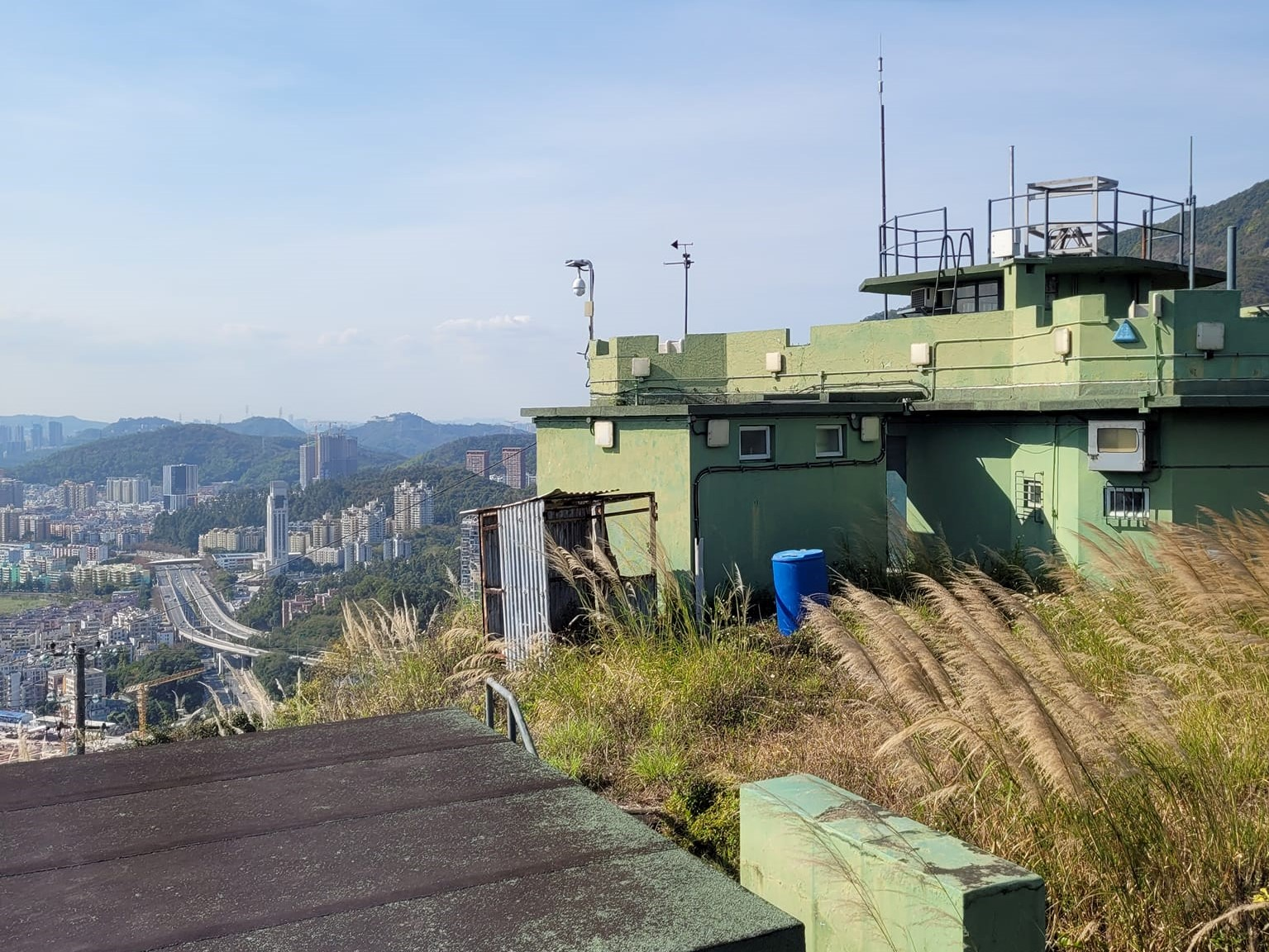
MacIntosh Fort at Kong Shan, Lin Ma Hang overlooking Shenzhen

- The Residence of Ip Ting-sz is a declared monument
- Old Bridge, Grade 3 historic building
- Ip Ancestral Hall, Grade 3 historic building
- Koon Ancestral Hall, Grade 3 historic building
- Kwan Tai Temple, not graded
- Lau Ancestral Hall, not graded
- MacIntosh Fort on Kong Shan above Lin Ma Han, Grade 2 historic building

== Access ==
Until 4 January 2016, the village was situated in the Frontier Closed Area and was therefore inaccessible to non-permit holders.

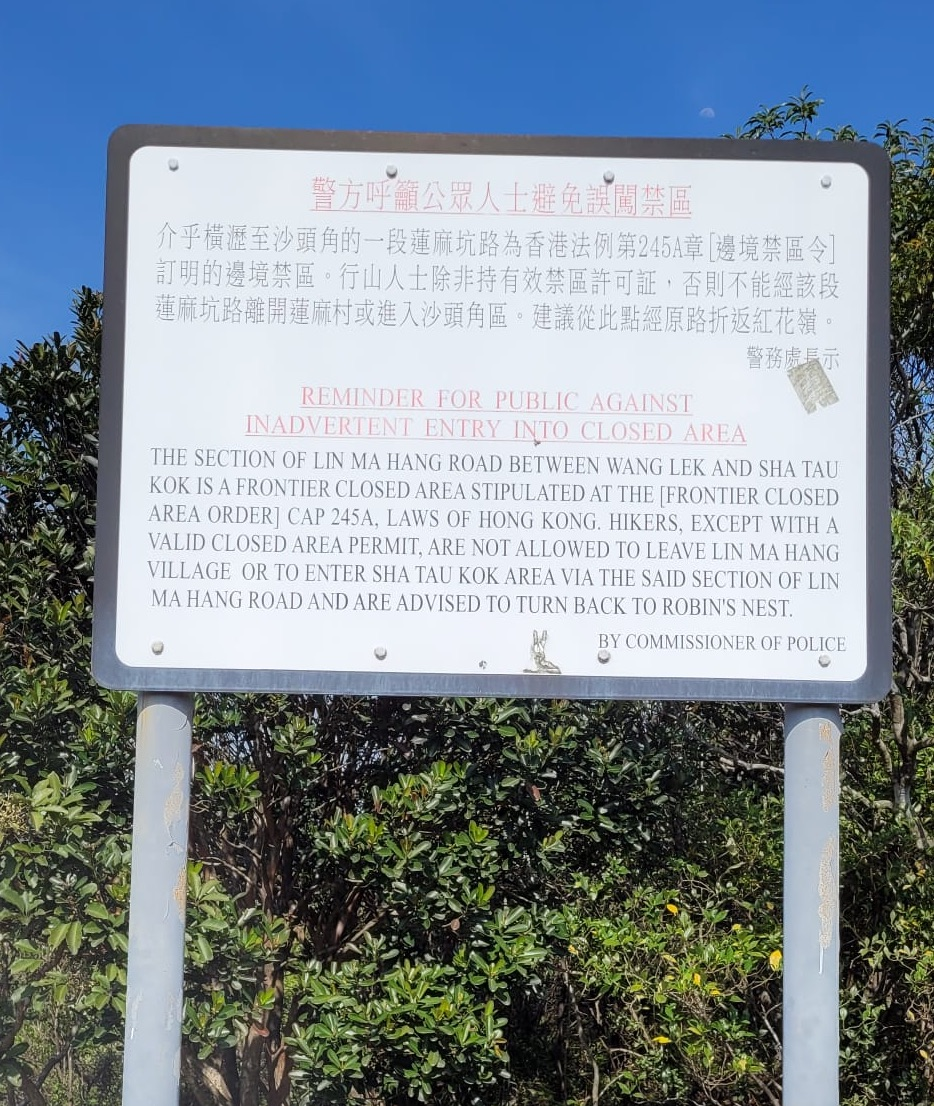
Police Notice about access to Lin Ma Hang. (There is, however, a path outside the closed area parallel to the road)

Since 4 January 2016, the village was excluded from the Frontier Closed Area. Nonetheless, a portion of Lin Ma Hang Road, the access road to the village, between Wang Lek and Lin Ma Hang, still falls within the closed area. Therefore, permits are still required for anyone visiting the village by road to travel on this section of road. Green Minibus 59K from Sheung Shui Station operates to Lin Ma Hang. Since early 2025 passengers using Green Minibus 59K do not require a permit when entering or leaving Lin Ma Hang.

A path (rough and with short steep sections in parts) parallel to the road outside the closed area has been built to allow non-permit holders to access or leave the village on foot.

The village may also be accessed by hiking down from Robin's Nest.

=== International Bridge ===
There is also a small bridge, called the "international bridge" (國際橋) that crosses into Mainland China to allow local villagers on both sides of the border to cross and farm lots. It is located just outside the gate from the village to Lin Ma Hang Road. People using the bridge must have a special "Cross Border Farming Permit". The Mainland border post can be seen from the gate. As of 2025 the bridge is abandoned.

== Gallery ==
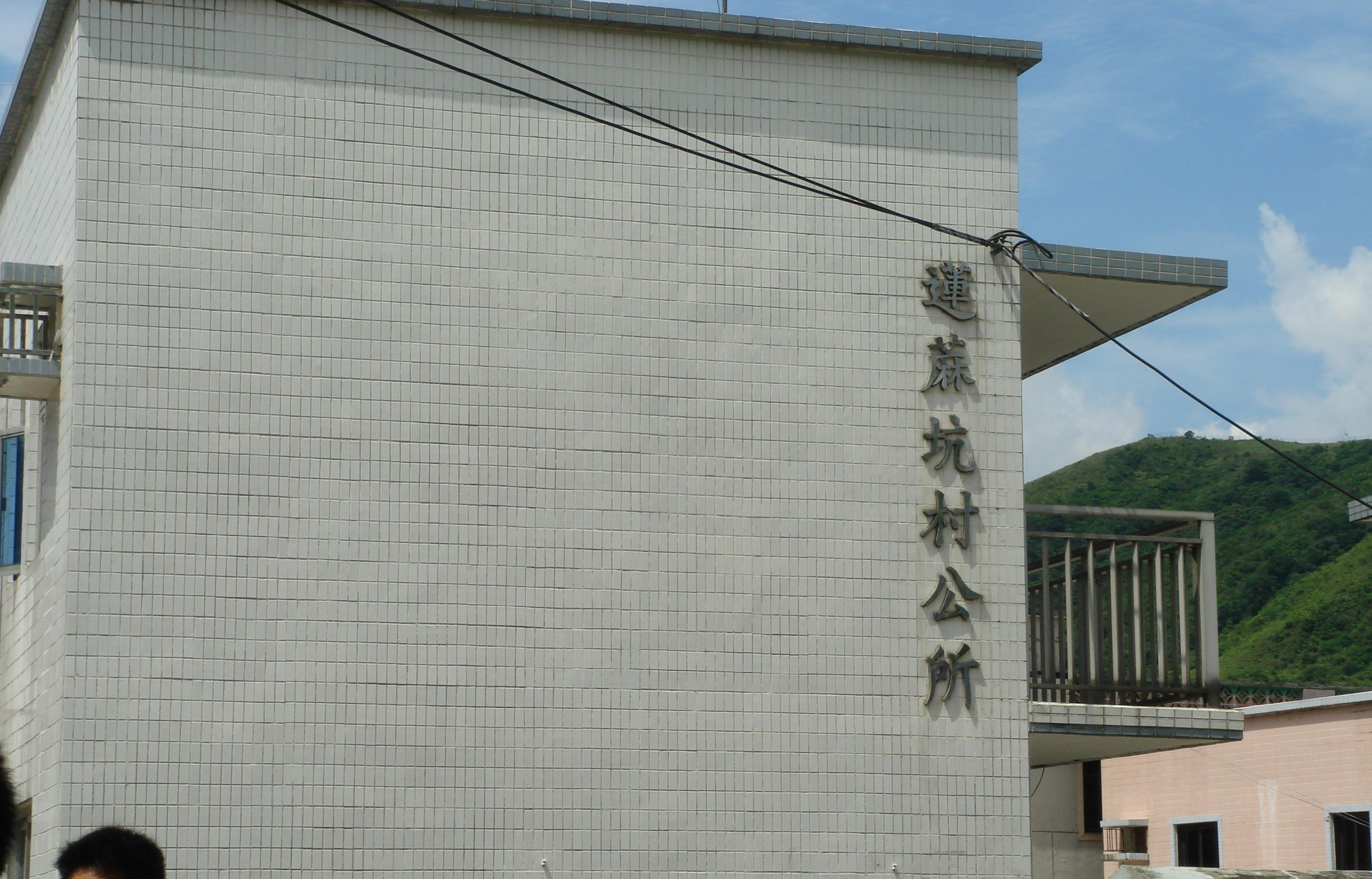
Lin Ma Hang Village Office

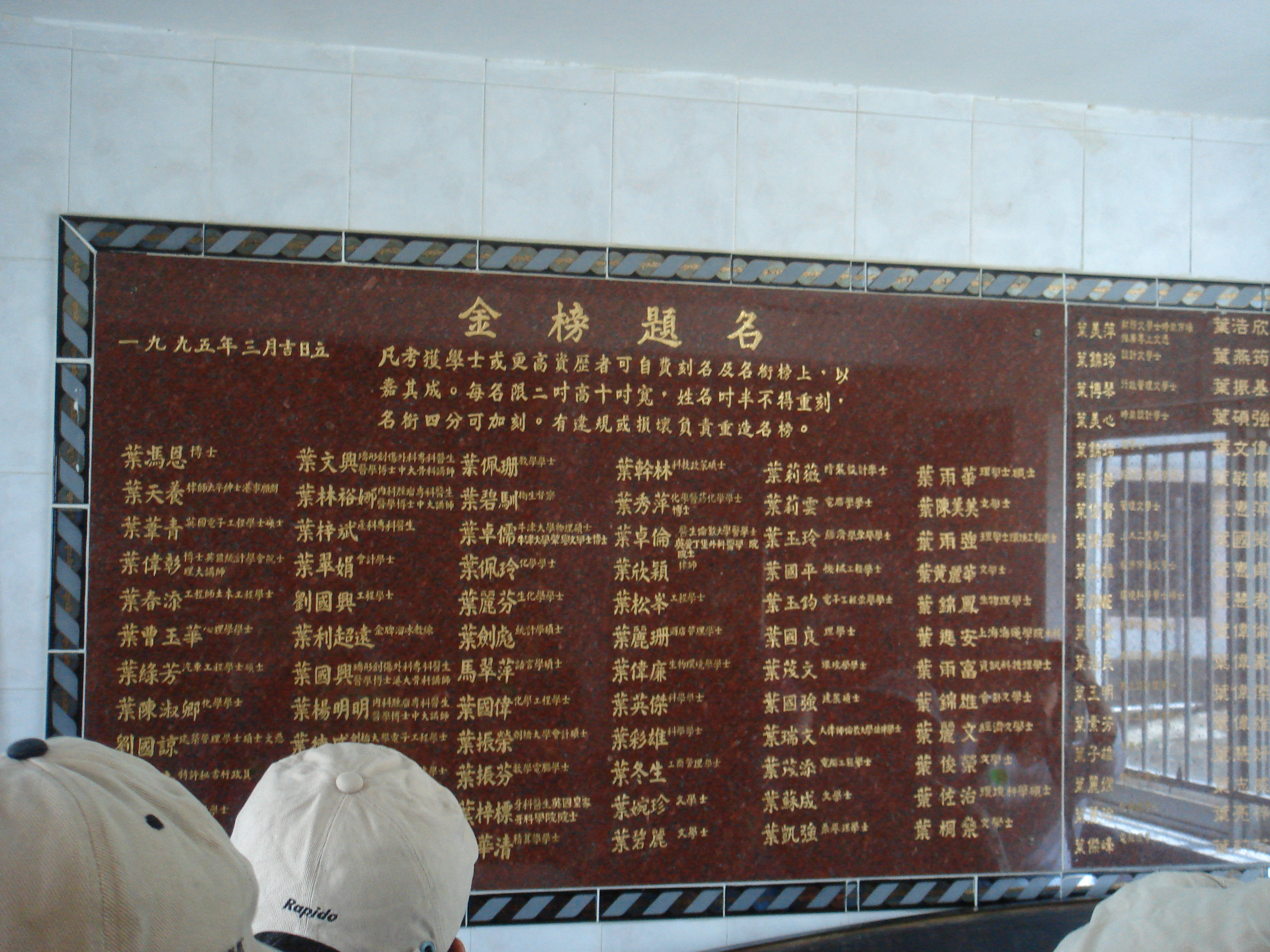
Village Office "Gold List" (recording villagers with a bachelor's degree or above)

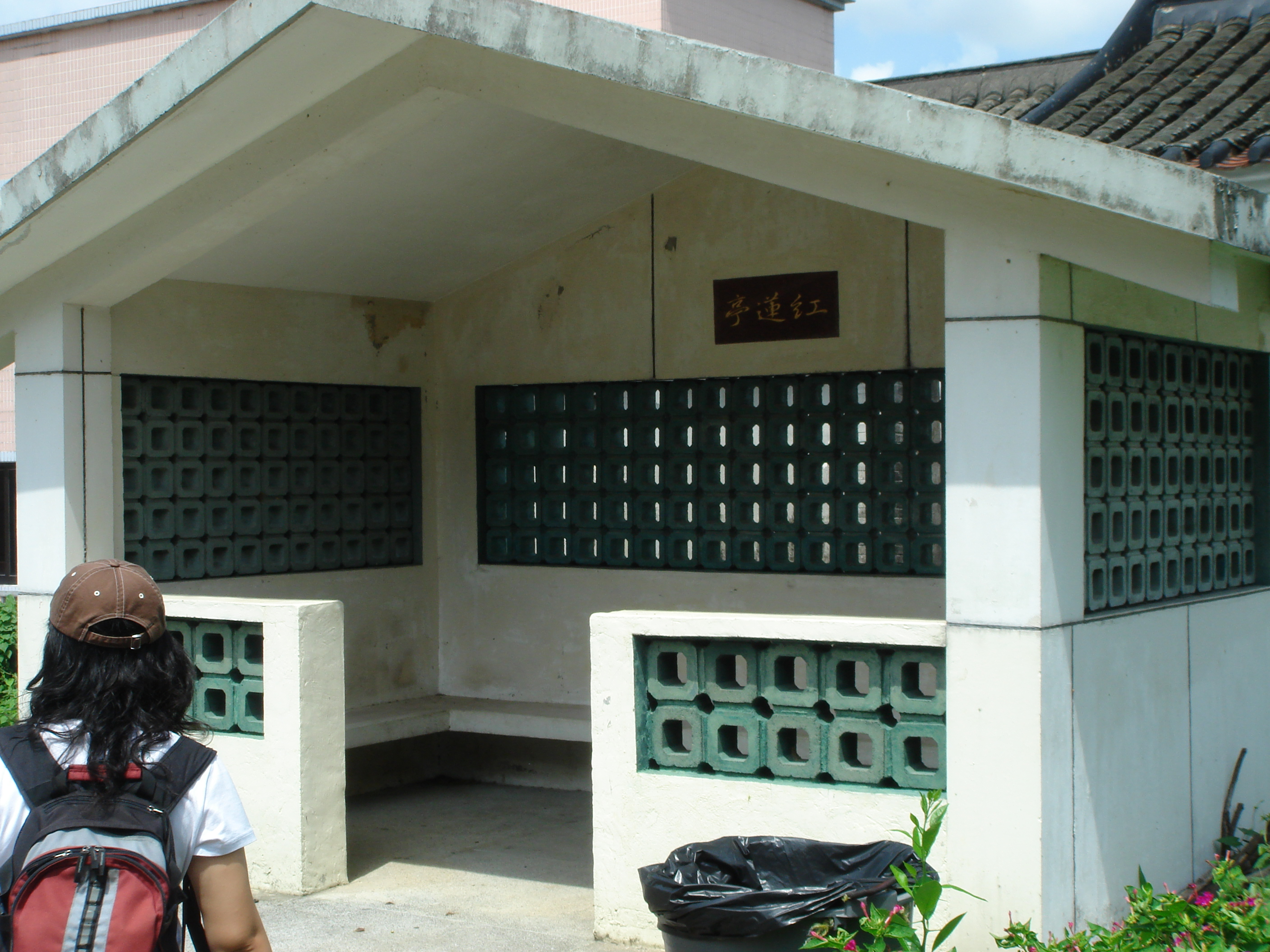
Red Lotus Pavilion (located opposite the village office)

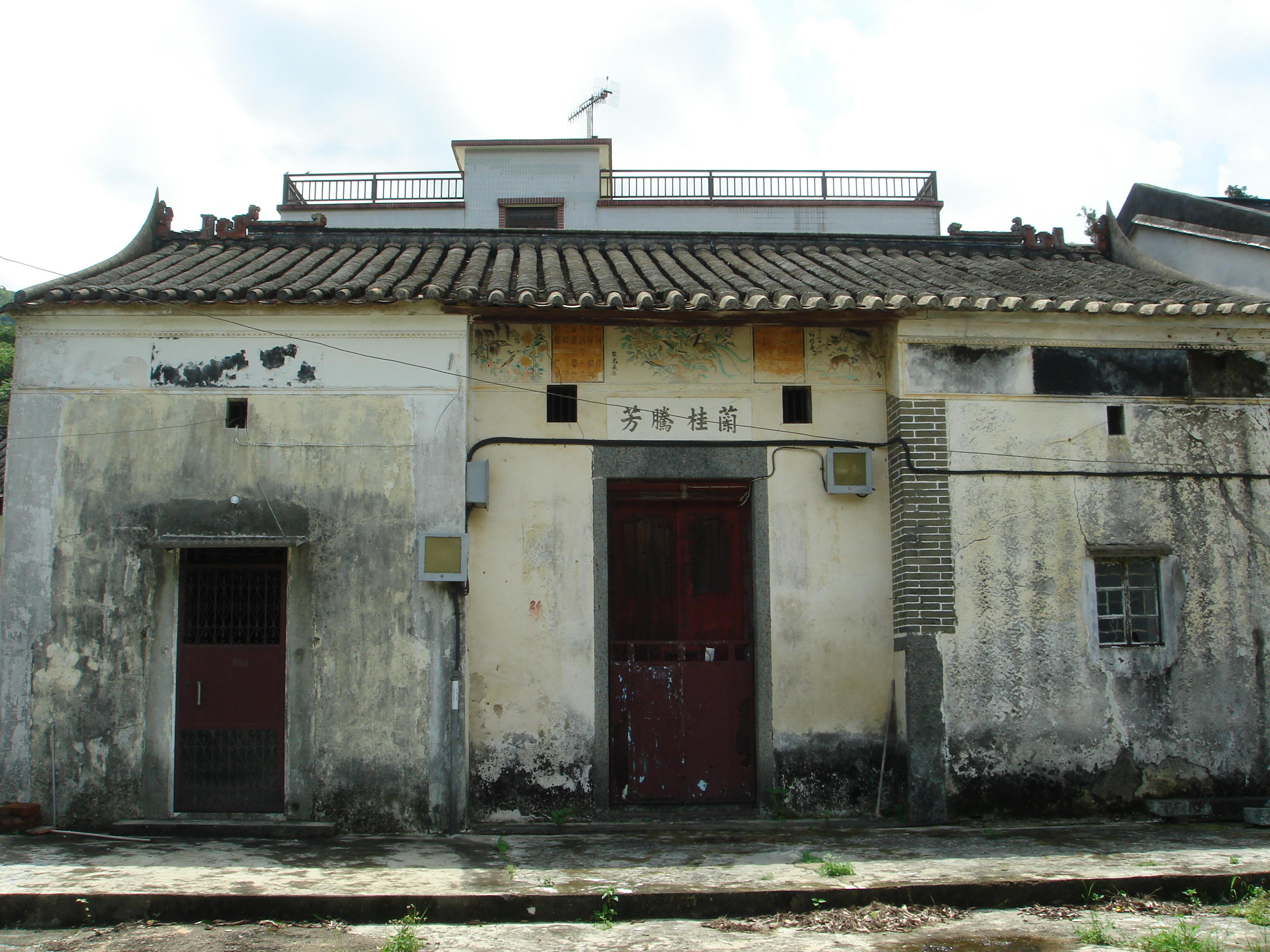

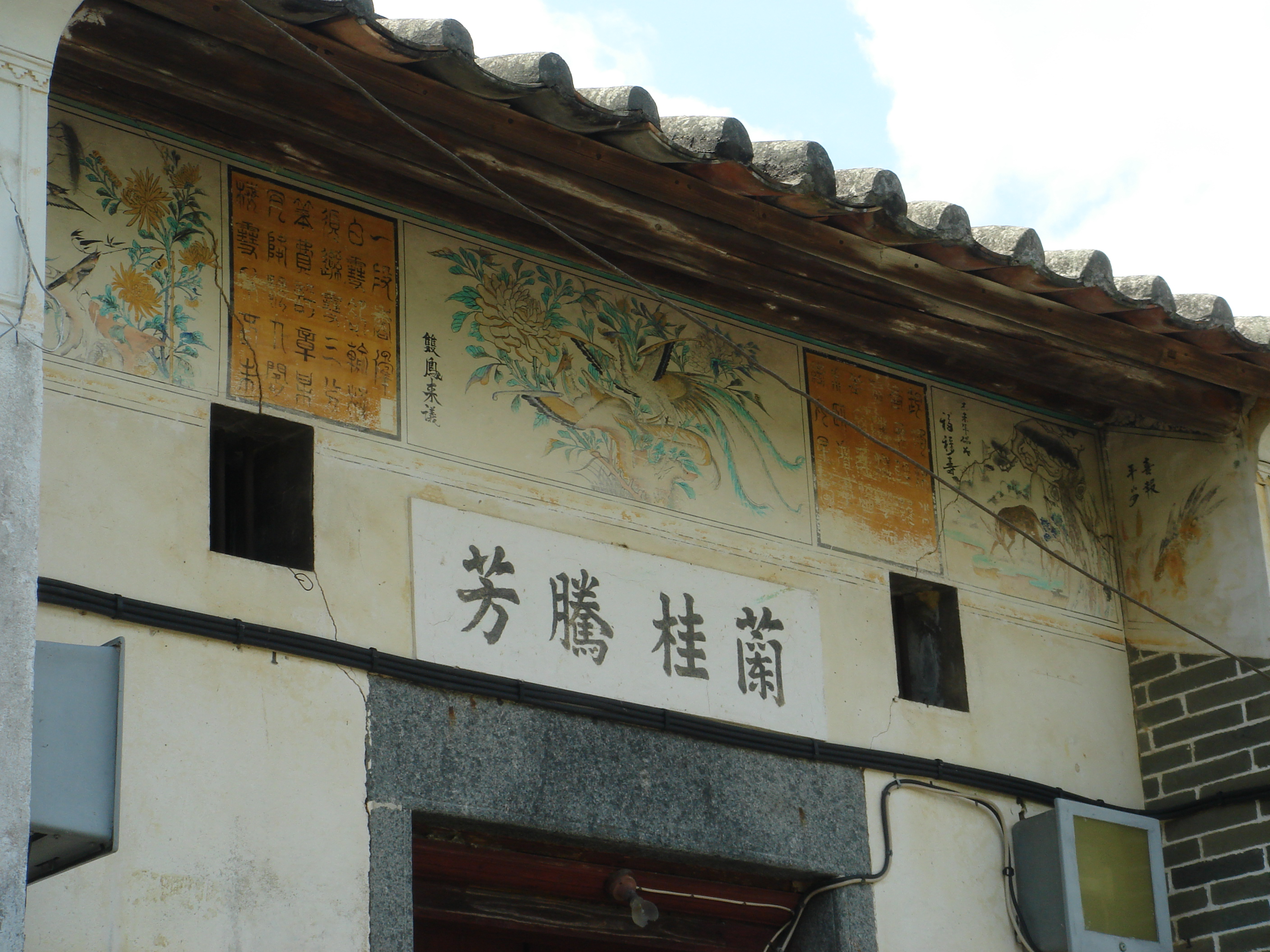

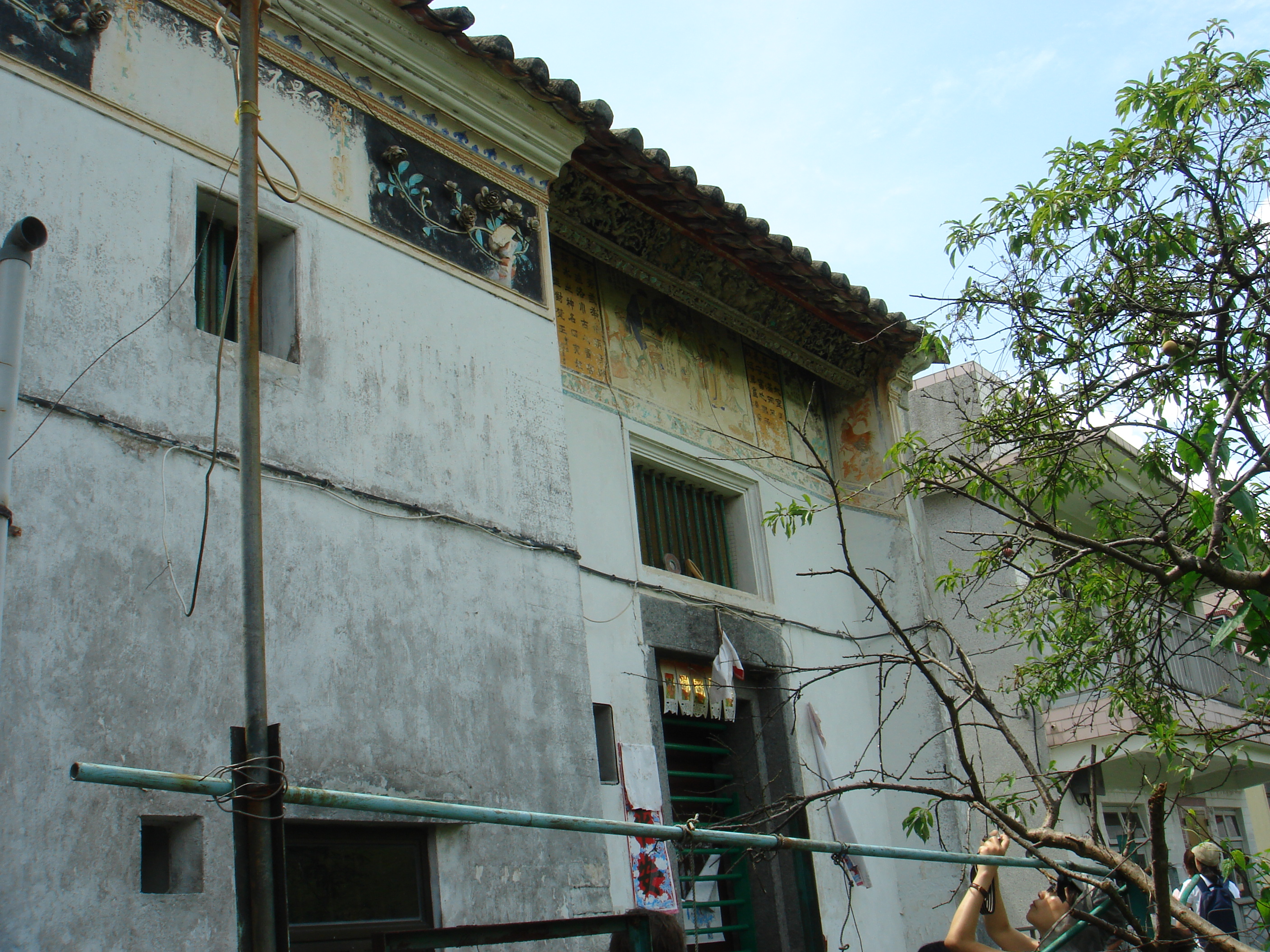

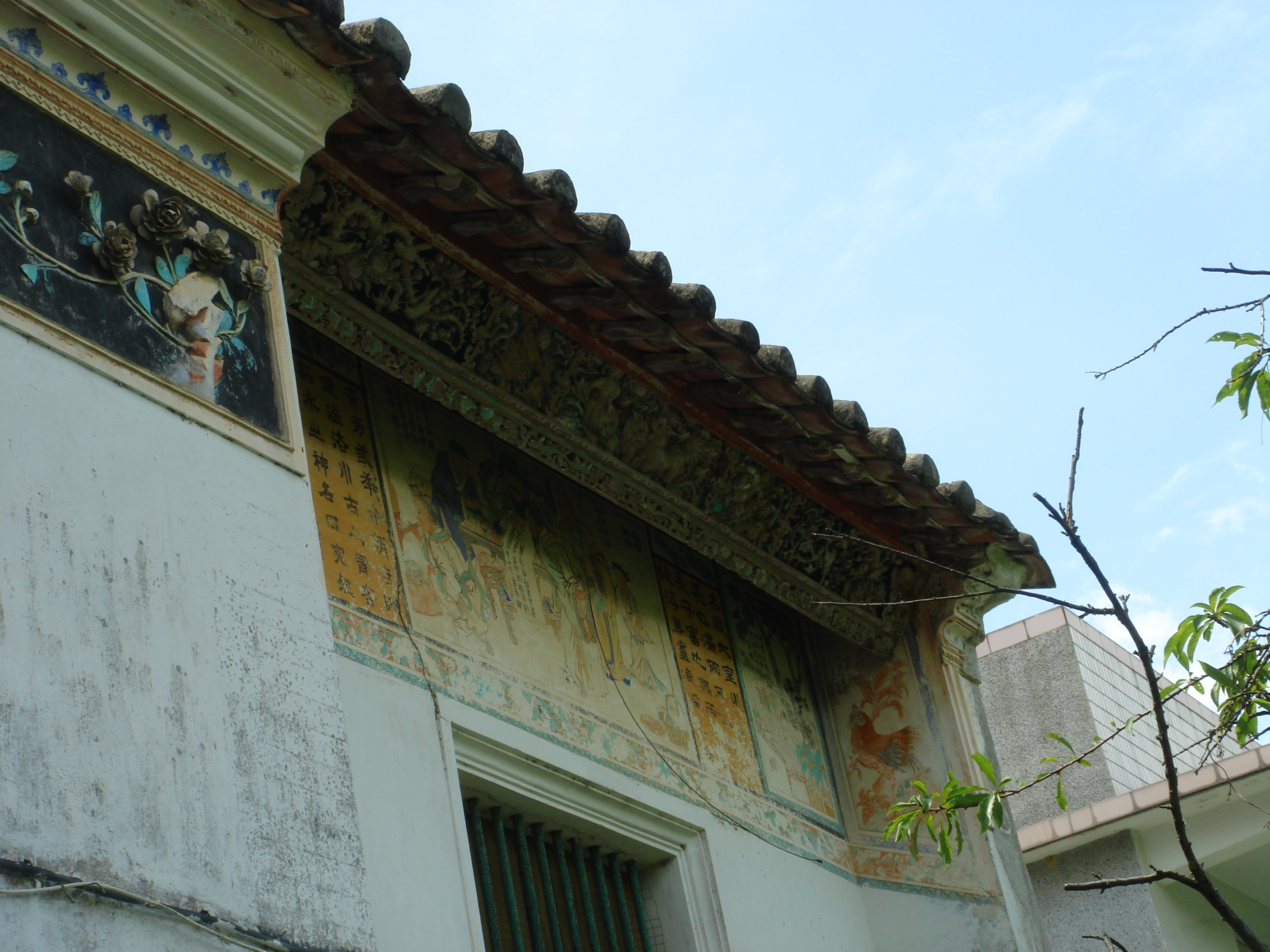

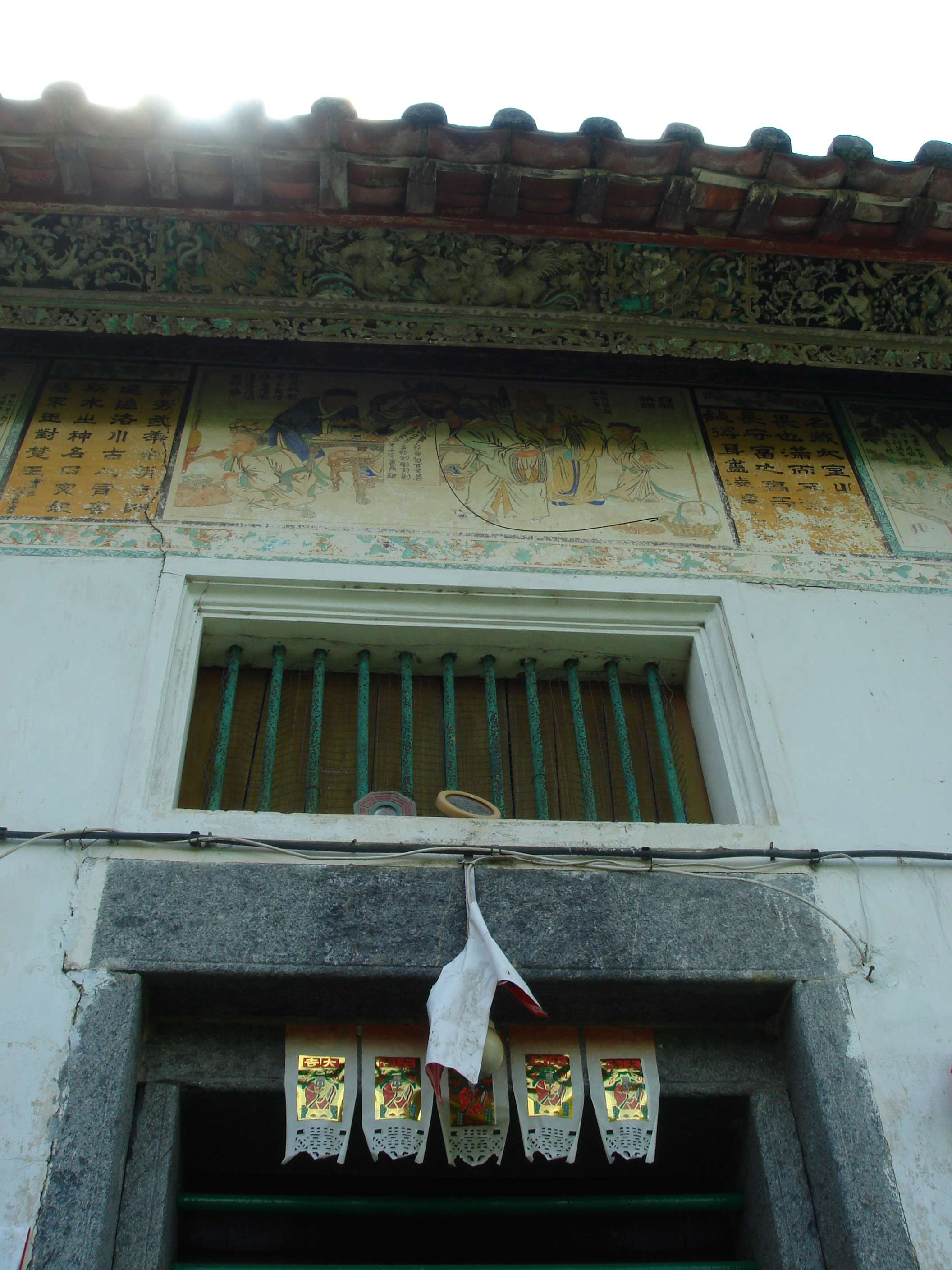

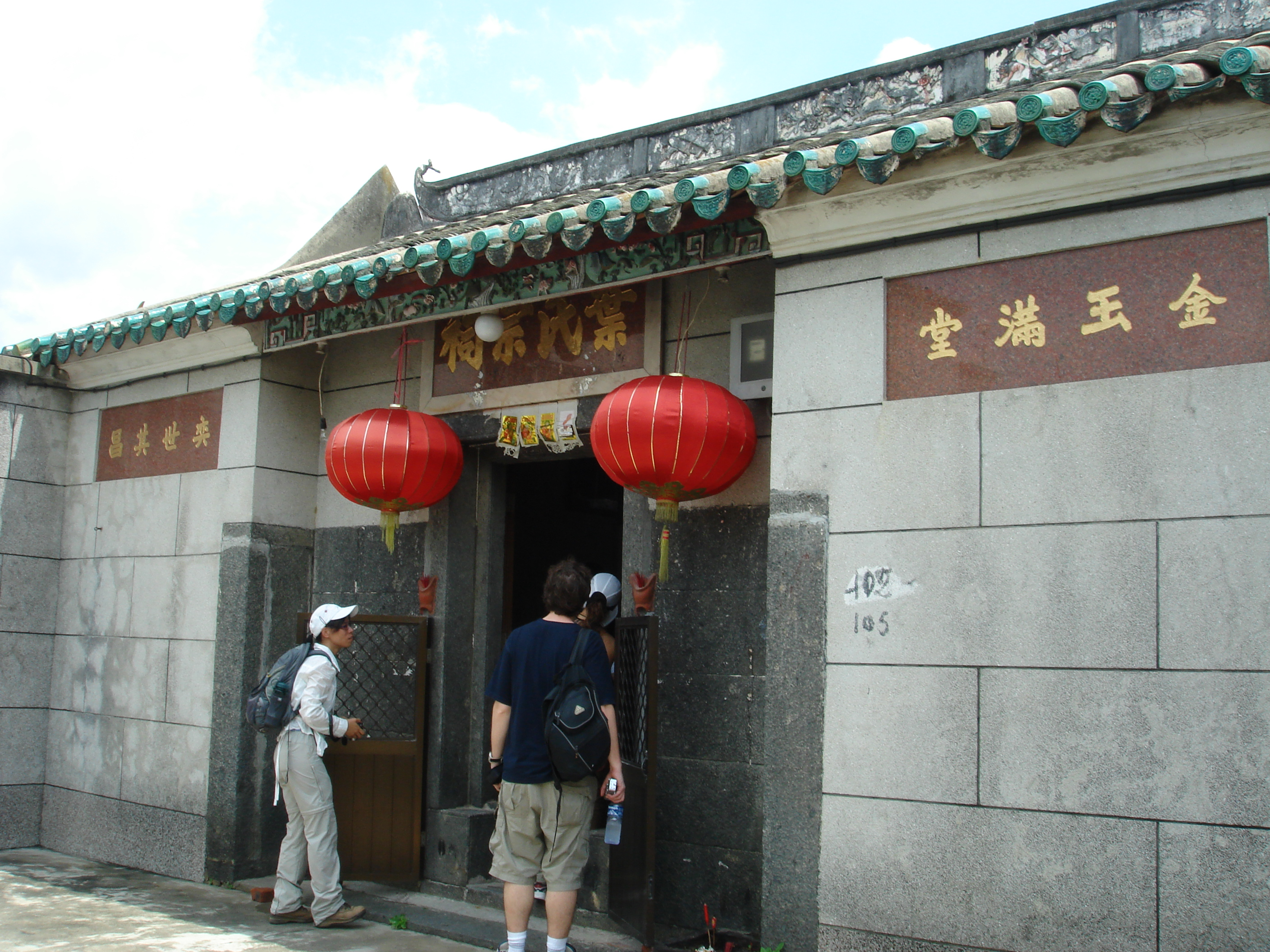
Yip Ancestral Hall

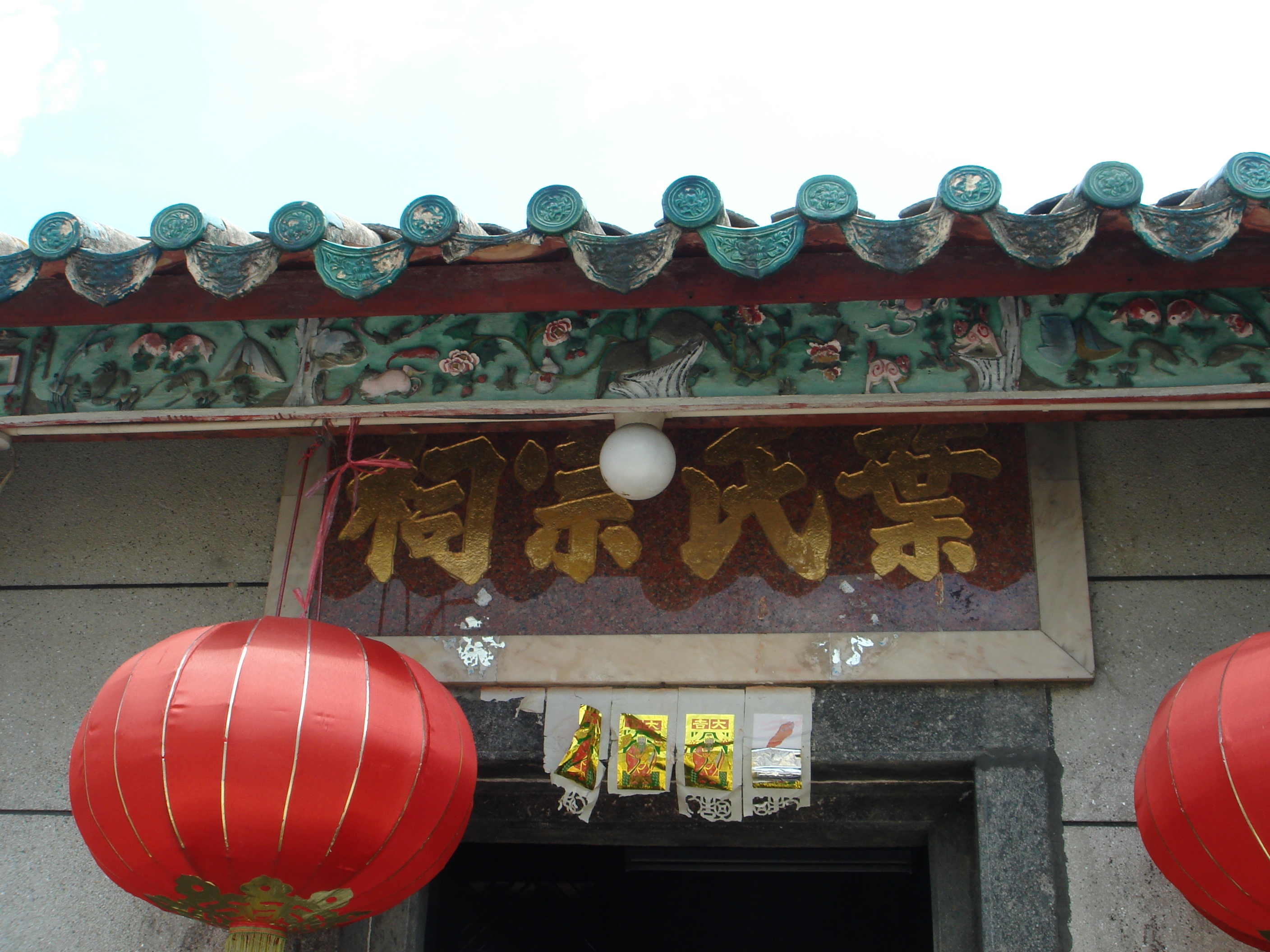
Yip Ancestral Hall

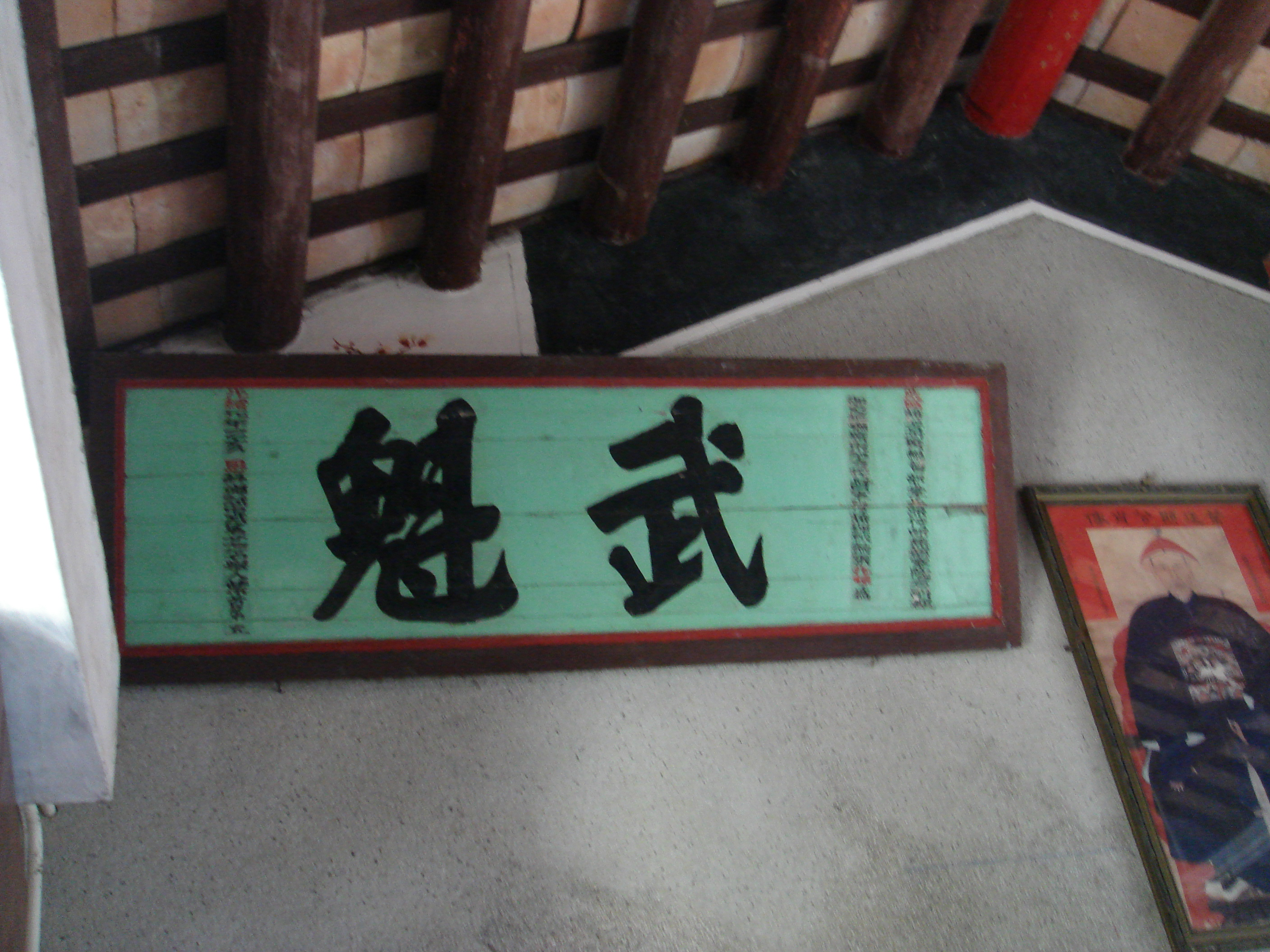
Interior of Yip Ancestral Hall

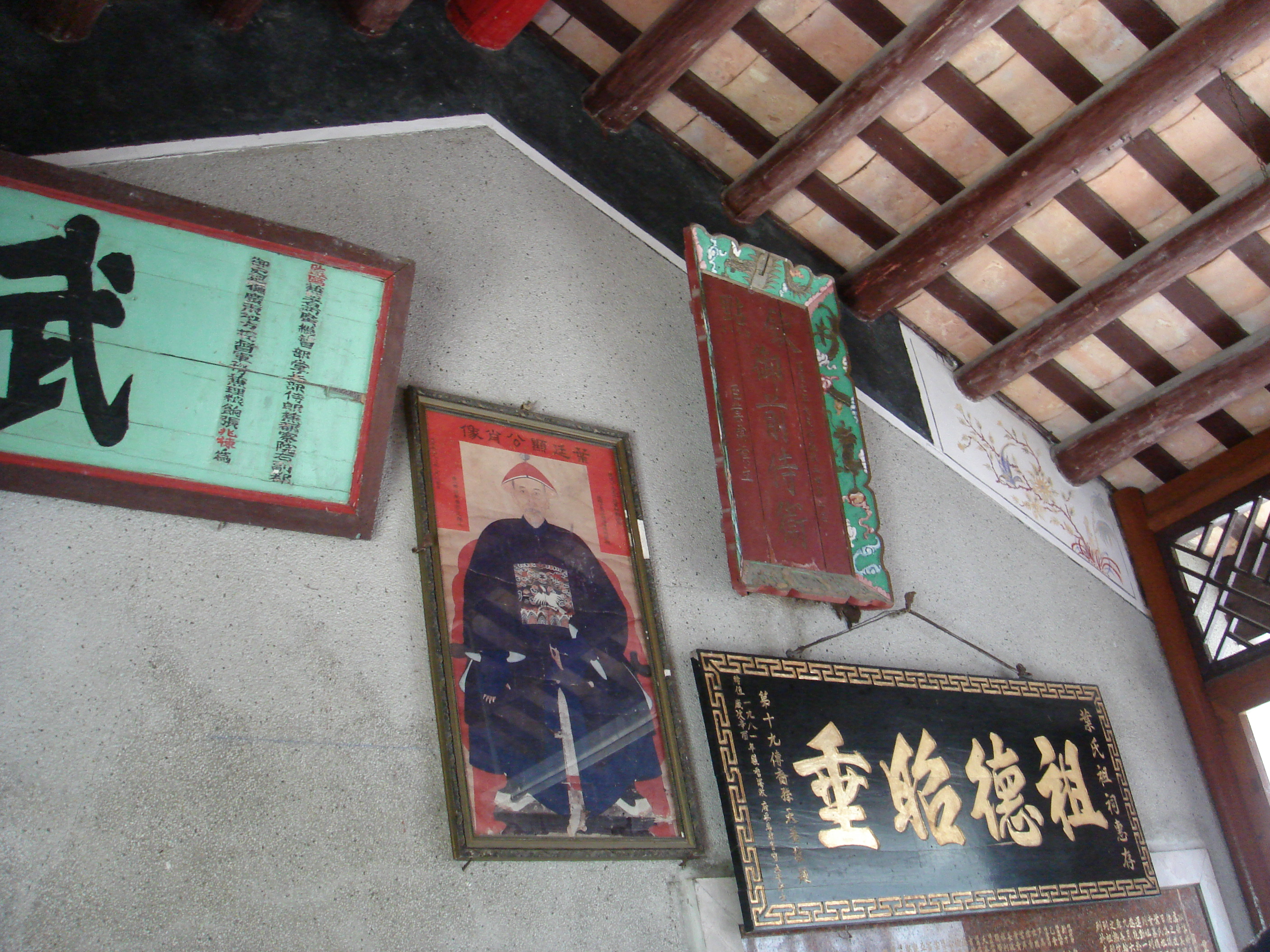
Interior of Yip Ancestral Hall

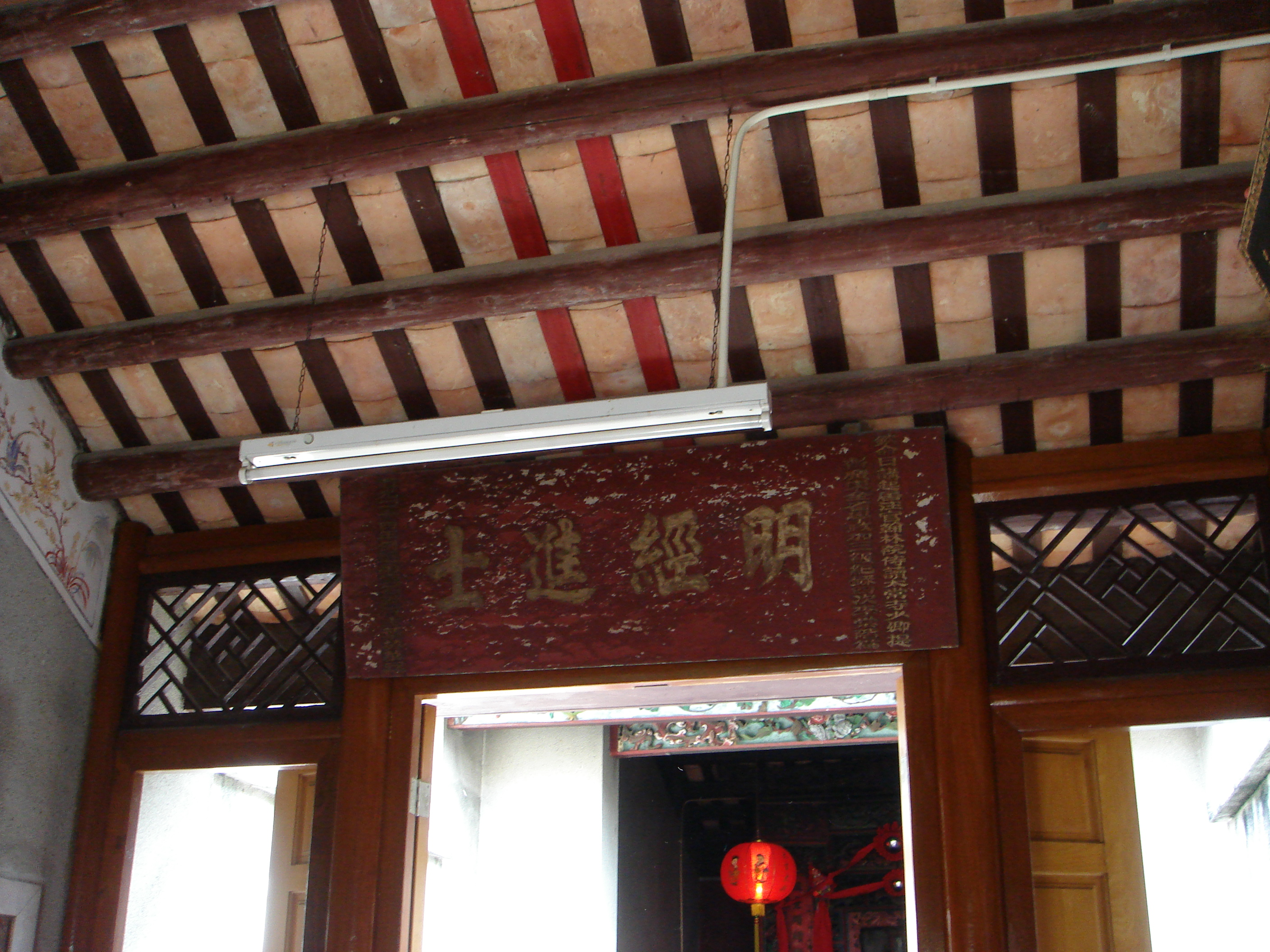
Interior of Yip Ancestral Hall

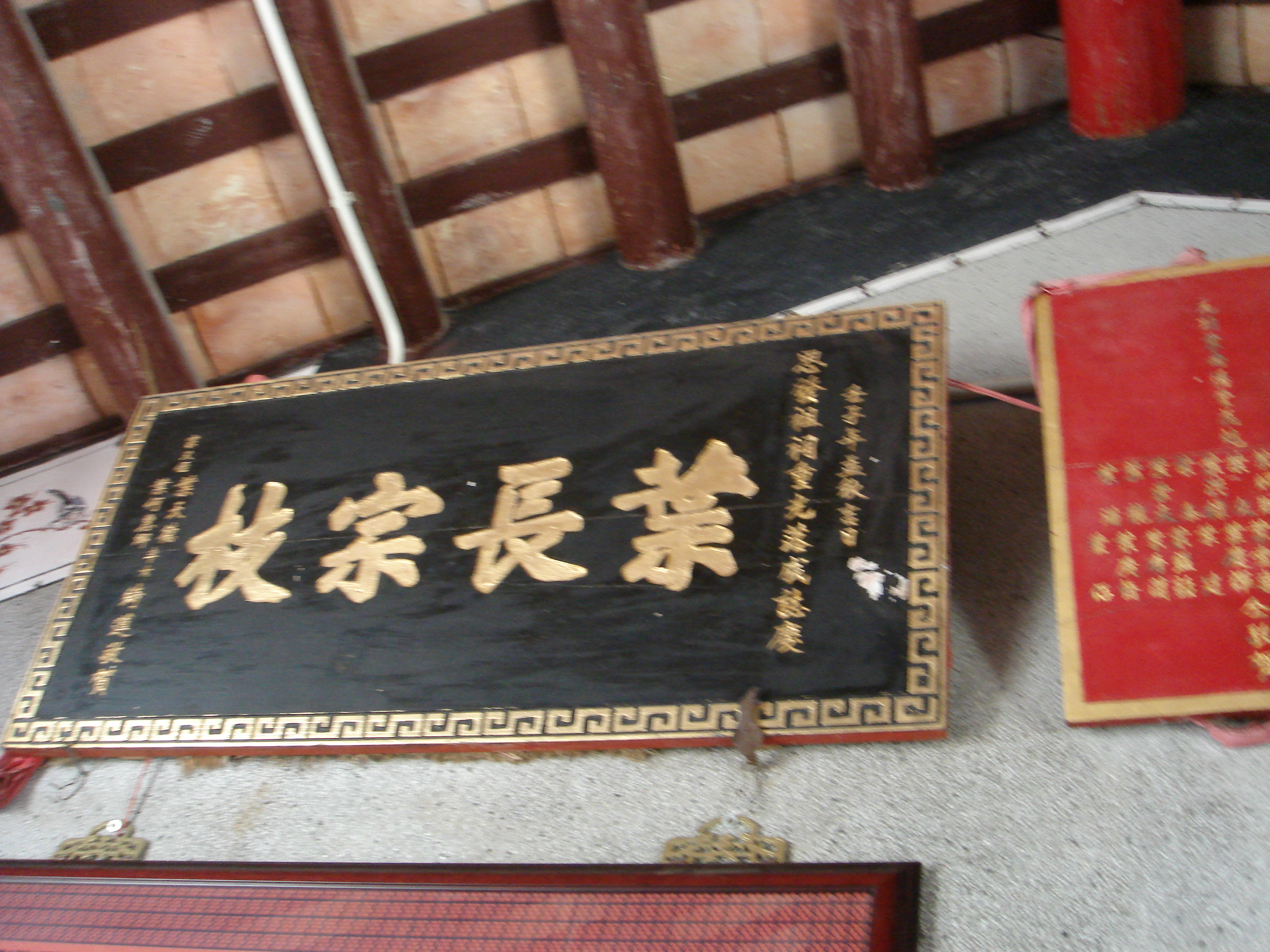
Interior of Yip Ancestral Hall

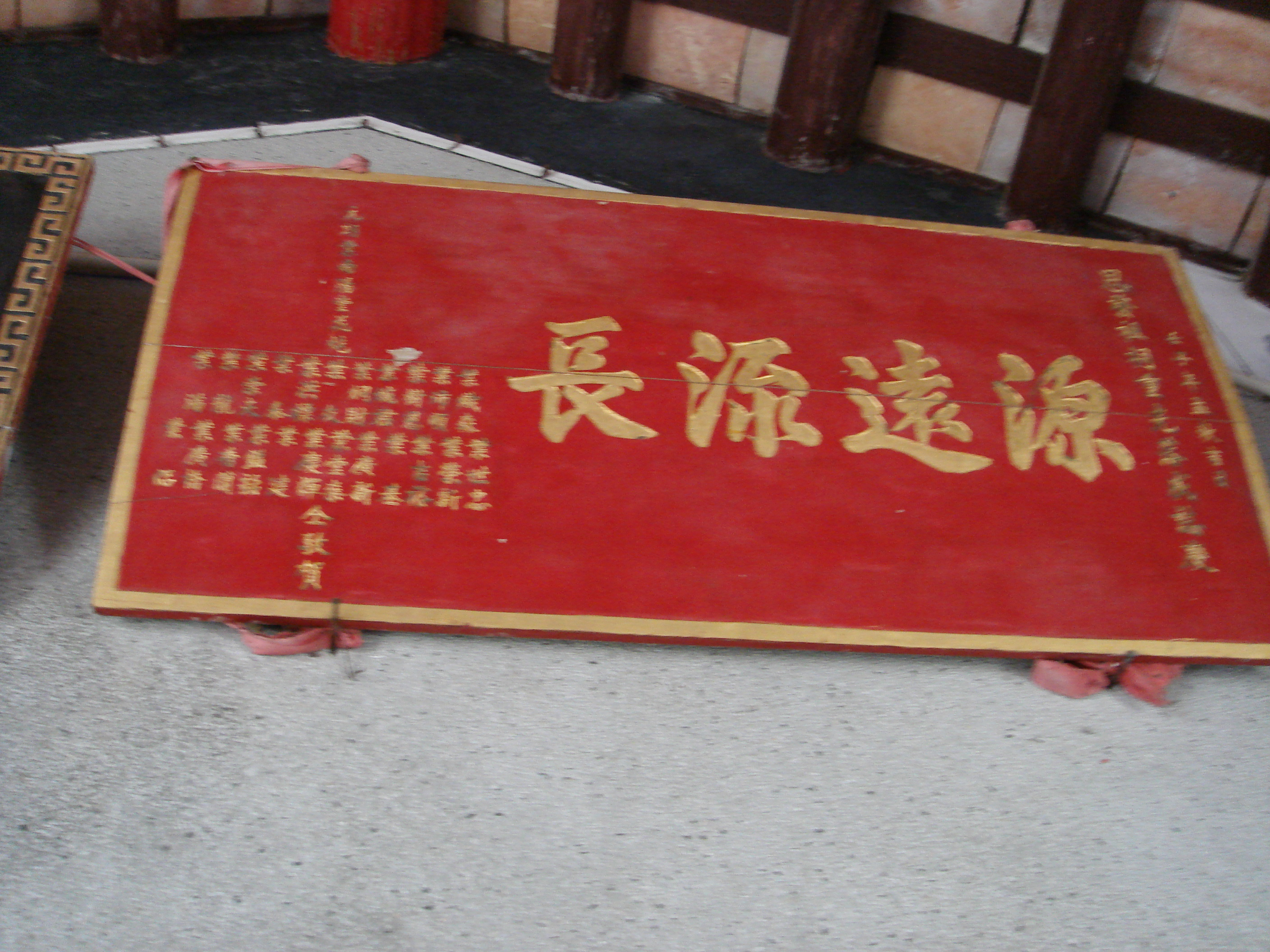
Interior of Yip Ancestral Hall

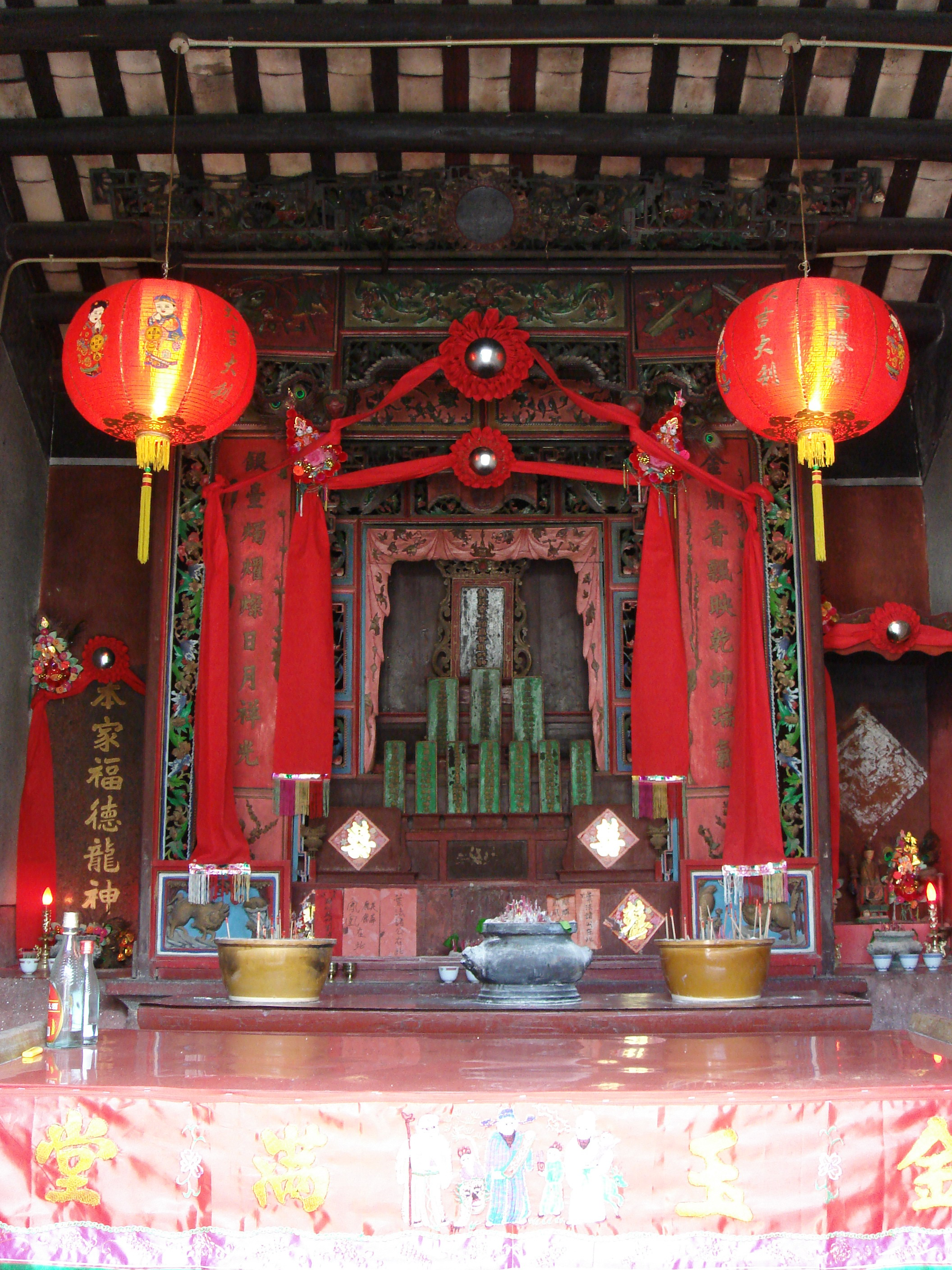
Interior of Yip Ancestral Hall

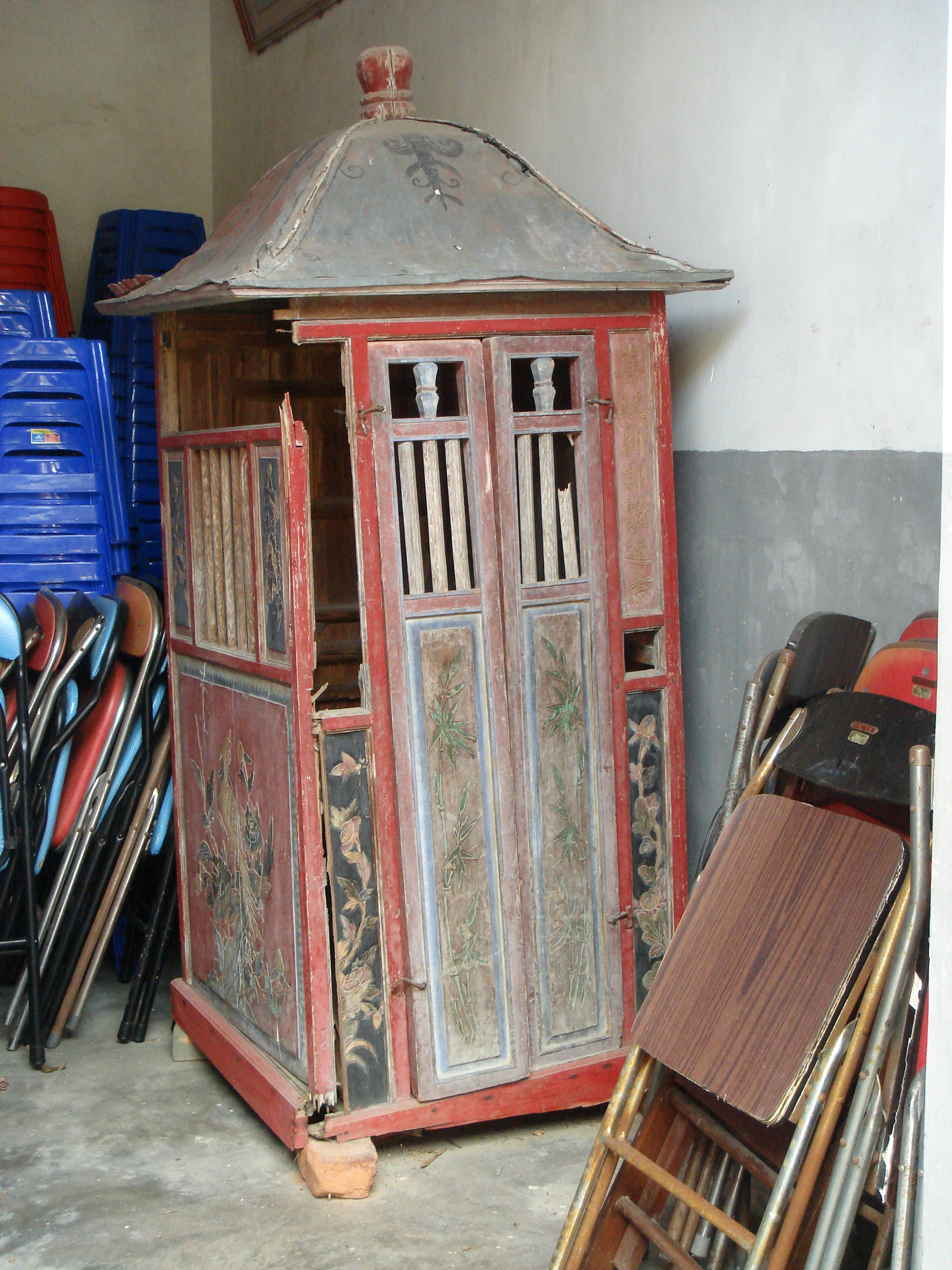
A sedan chair in Yip ancestral hall, used for marriage in ancient times

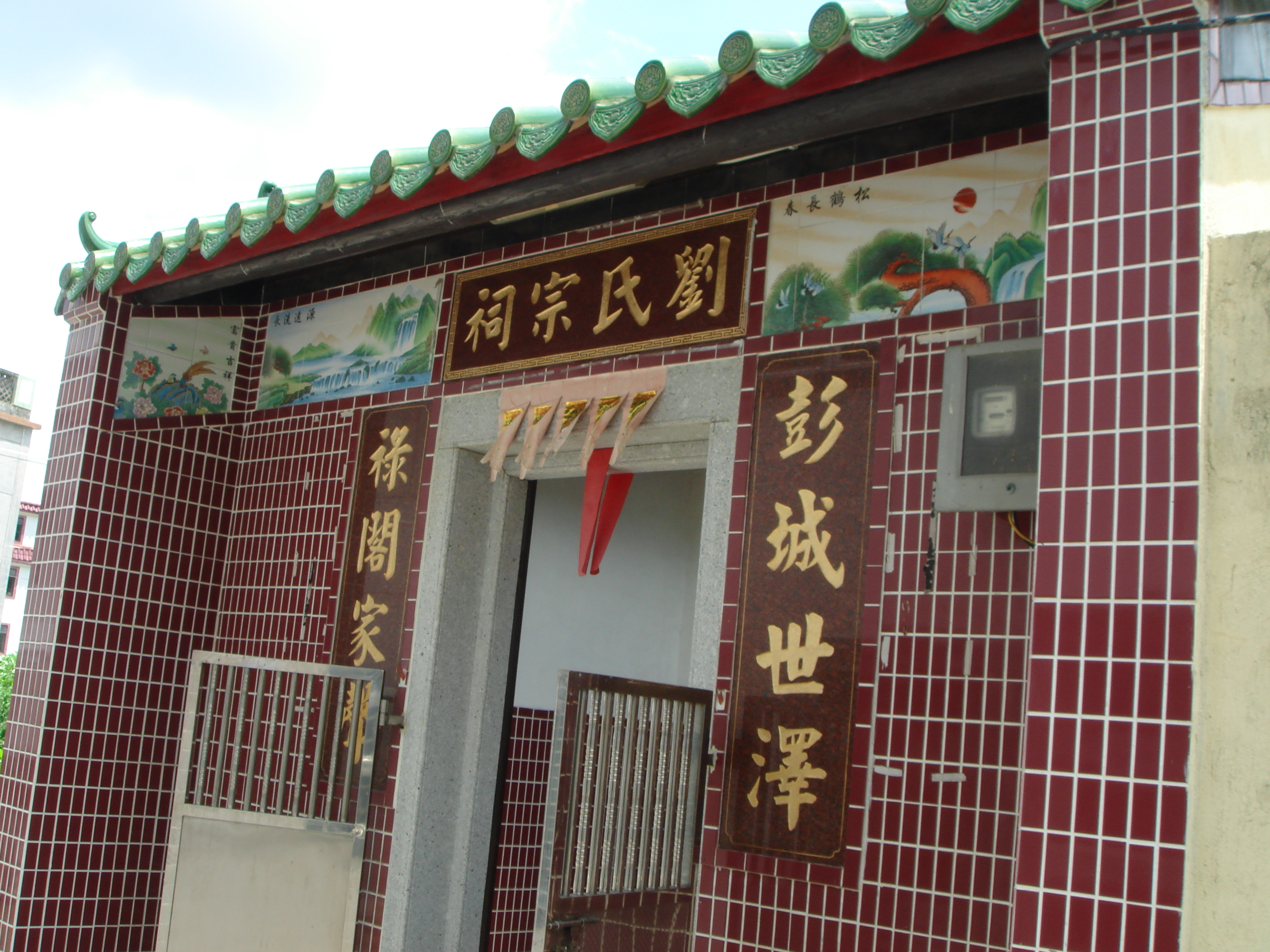
Yip Ancestral Hall

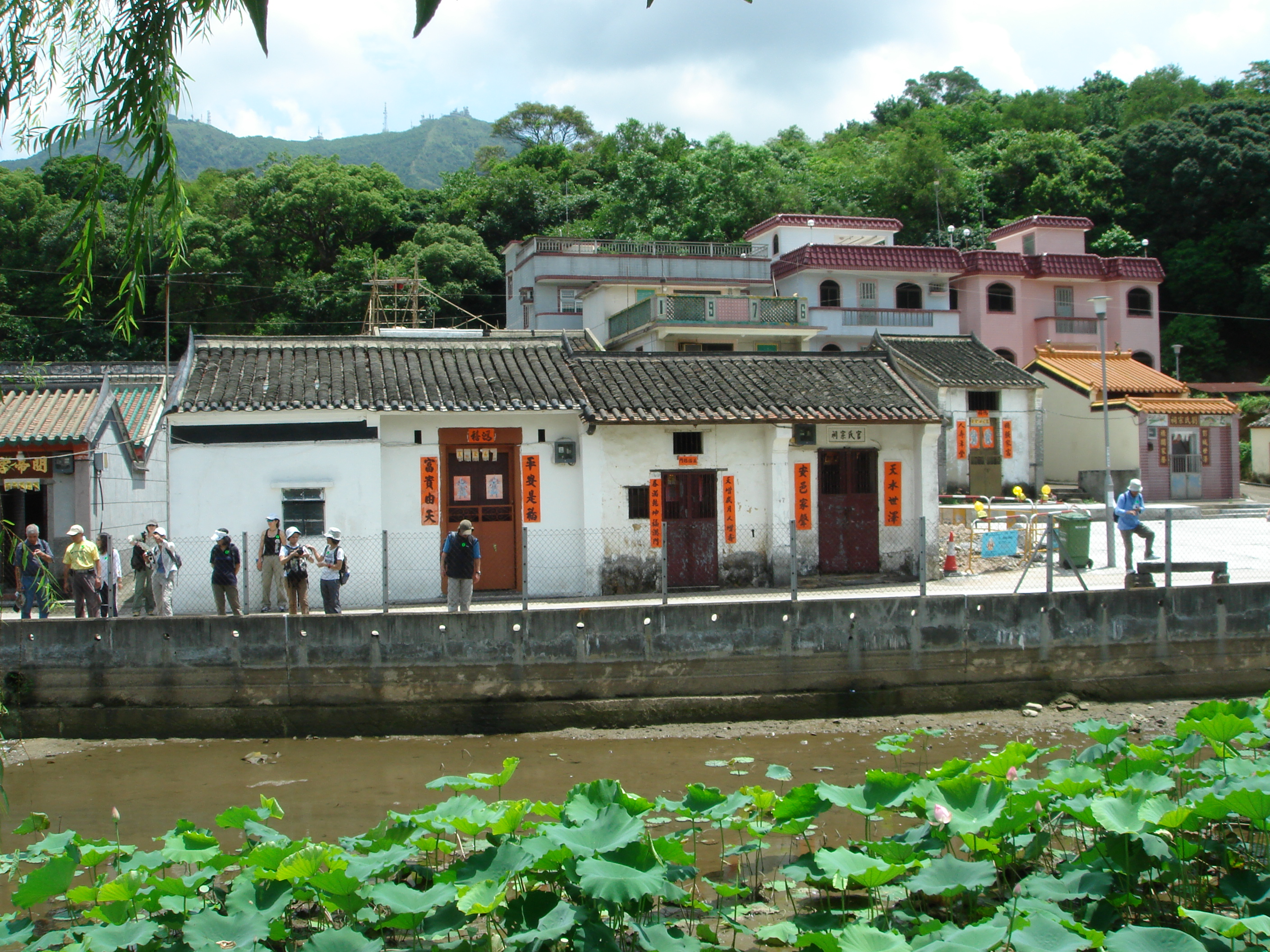
Traditional village houses

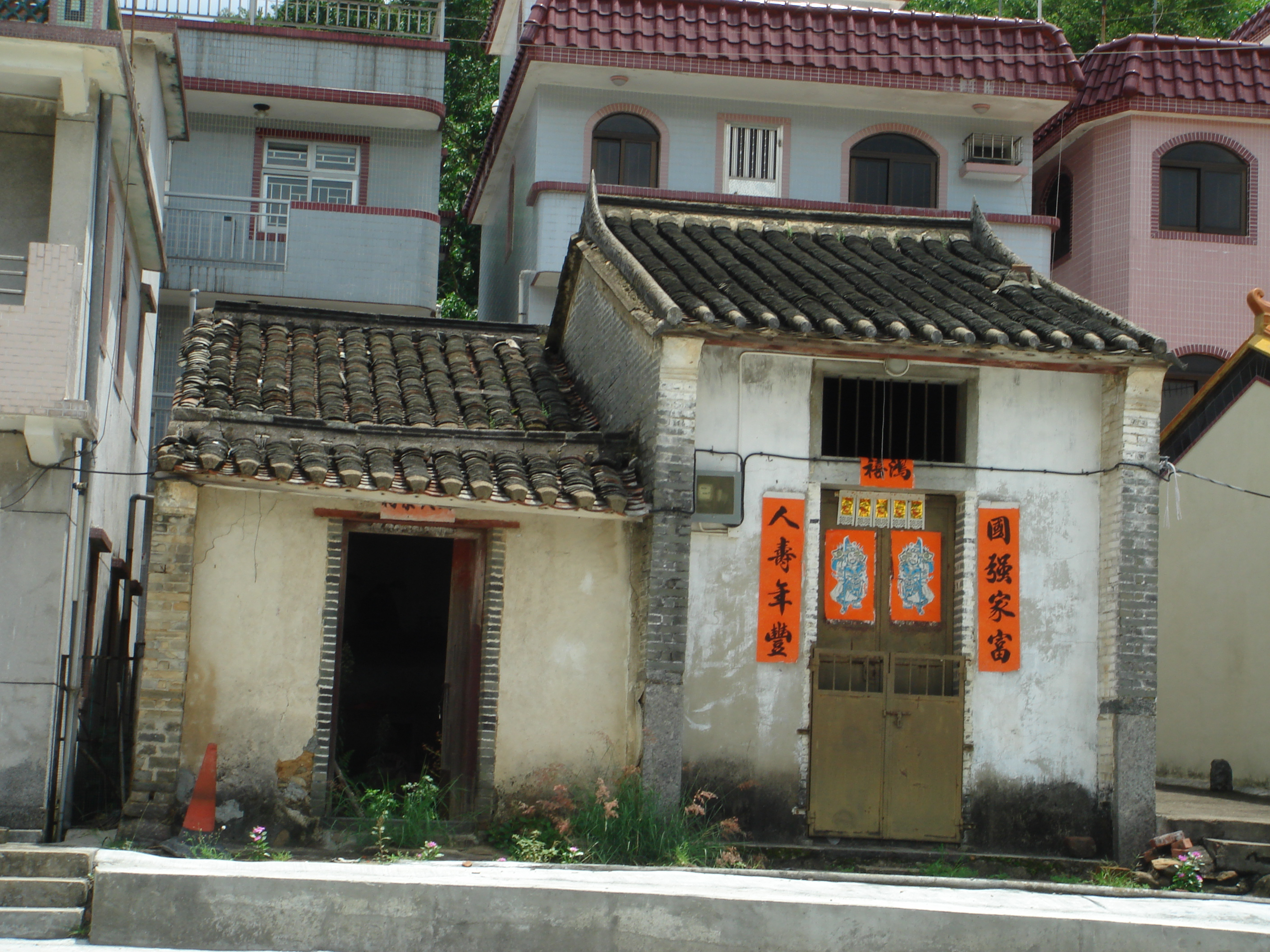
Traditional village houses

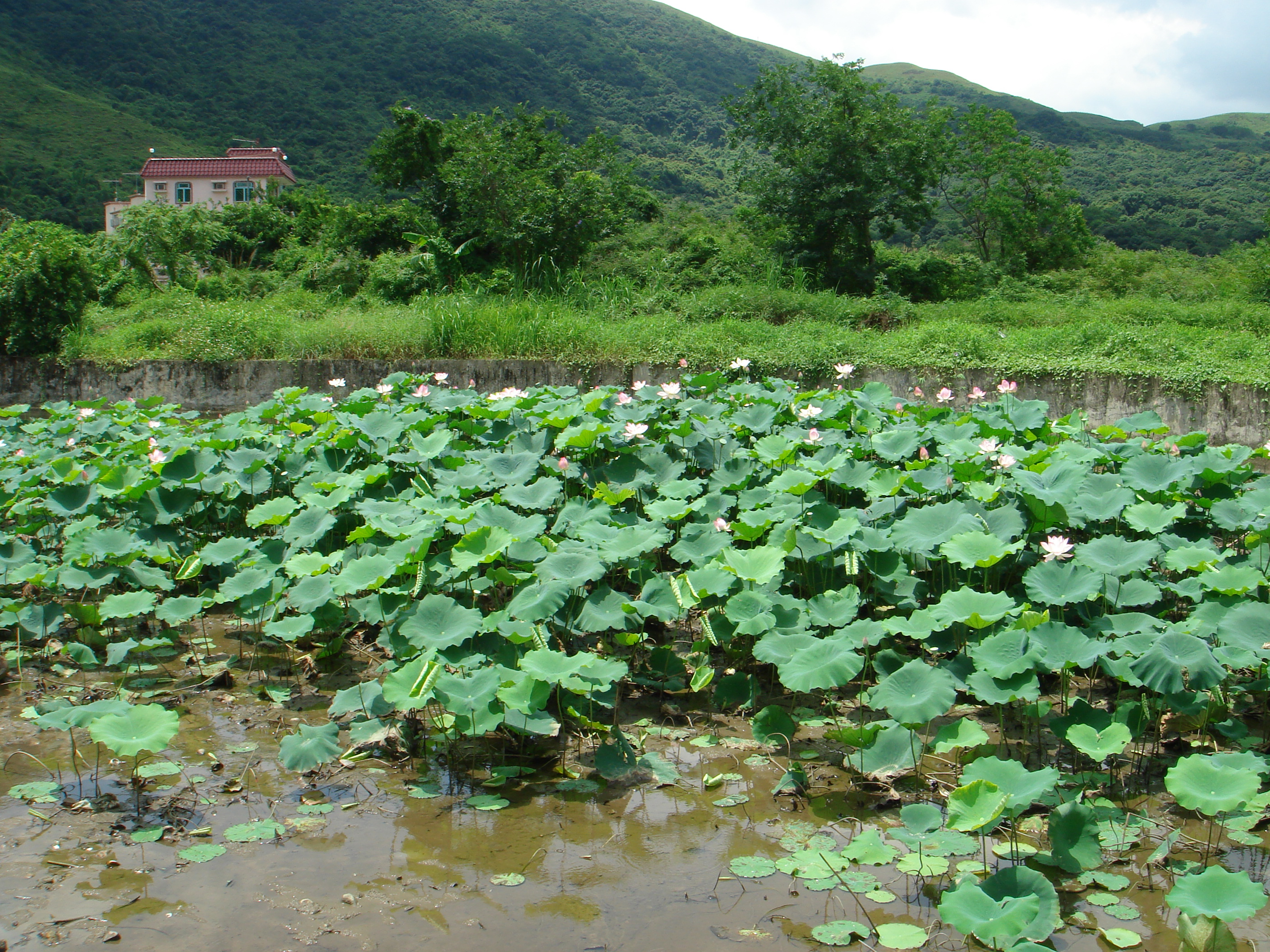
The pond facing the buildings (the pond water has been temporarily drained)

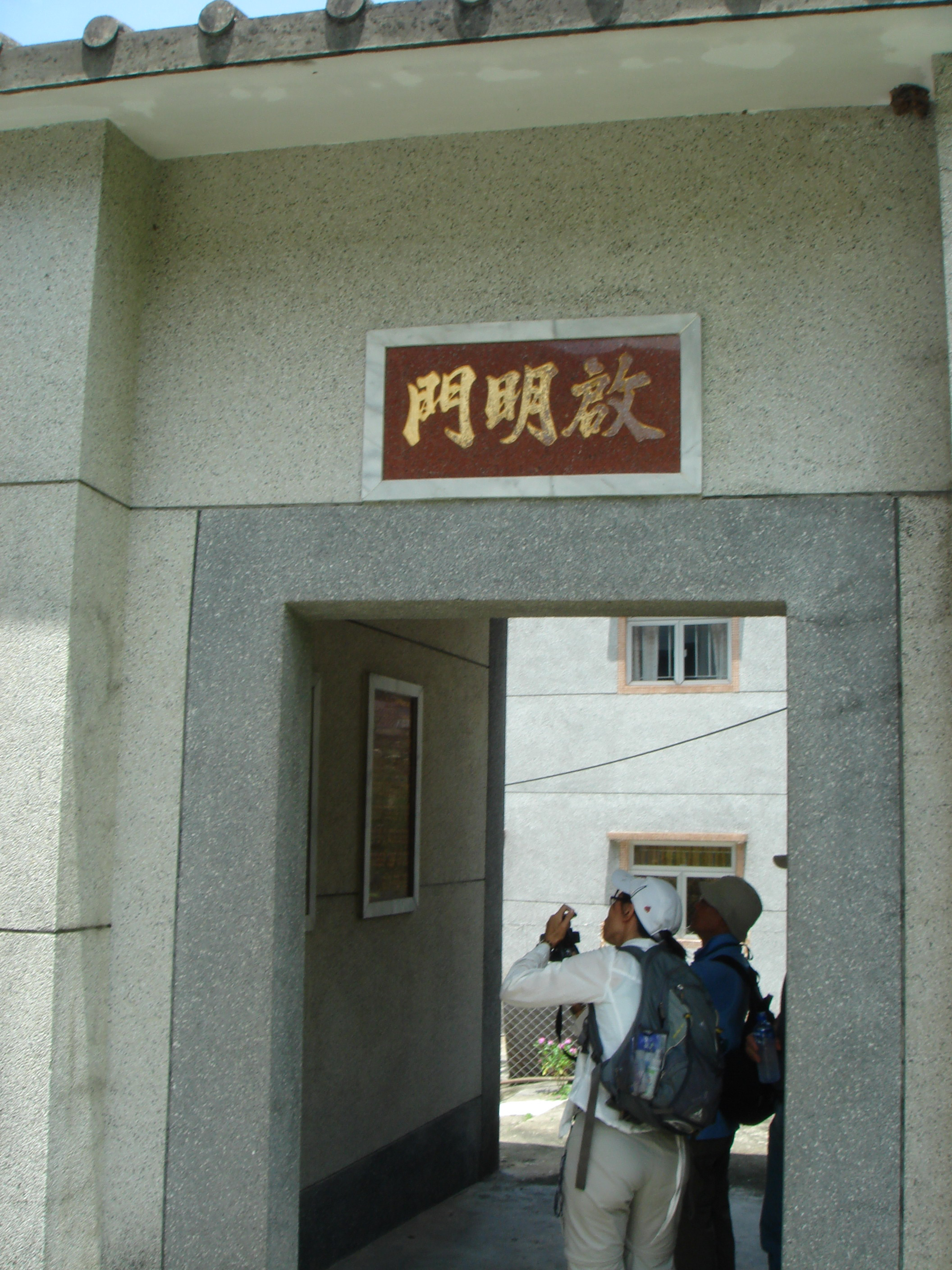
Kai Ming Gate

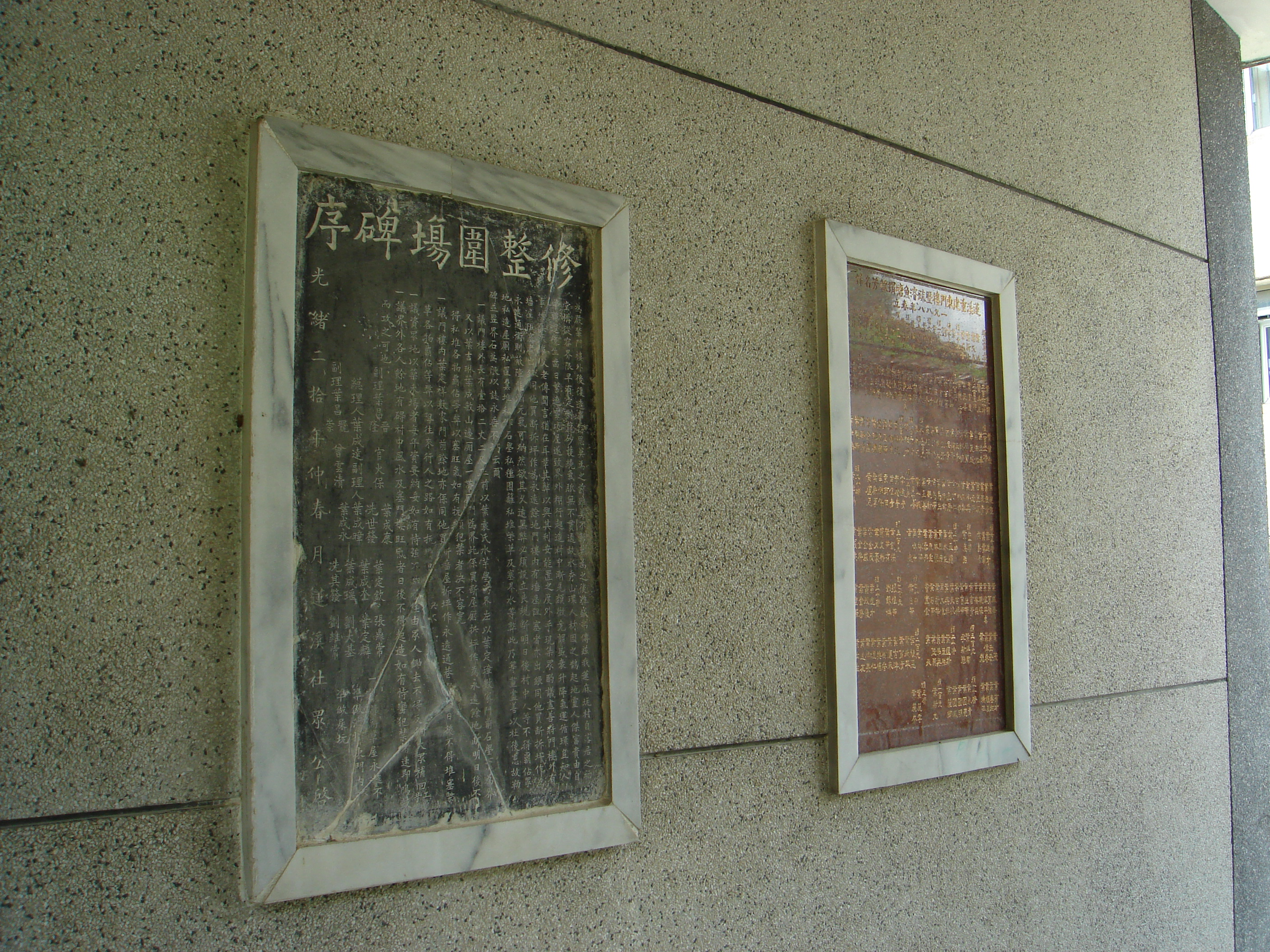
Inside the Kaiming Gate (Note: The black memorial tablet on the left has a long history)

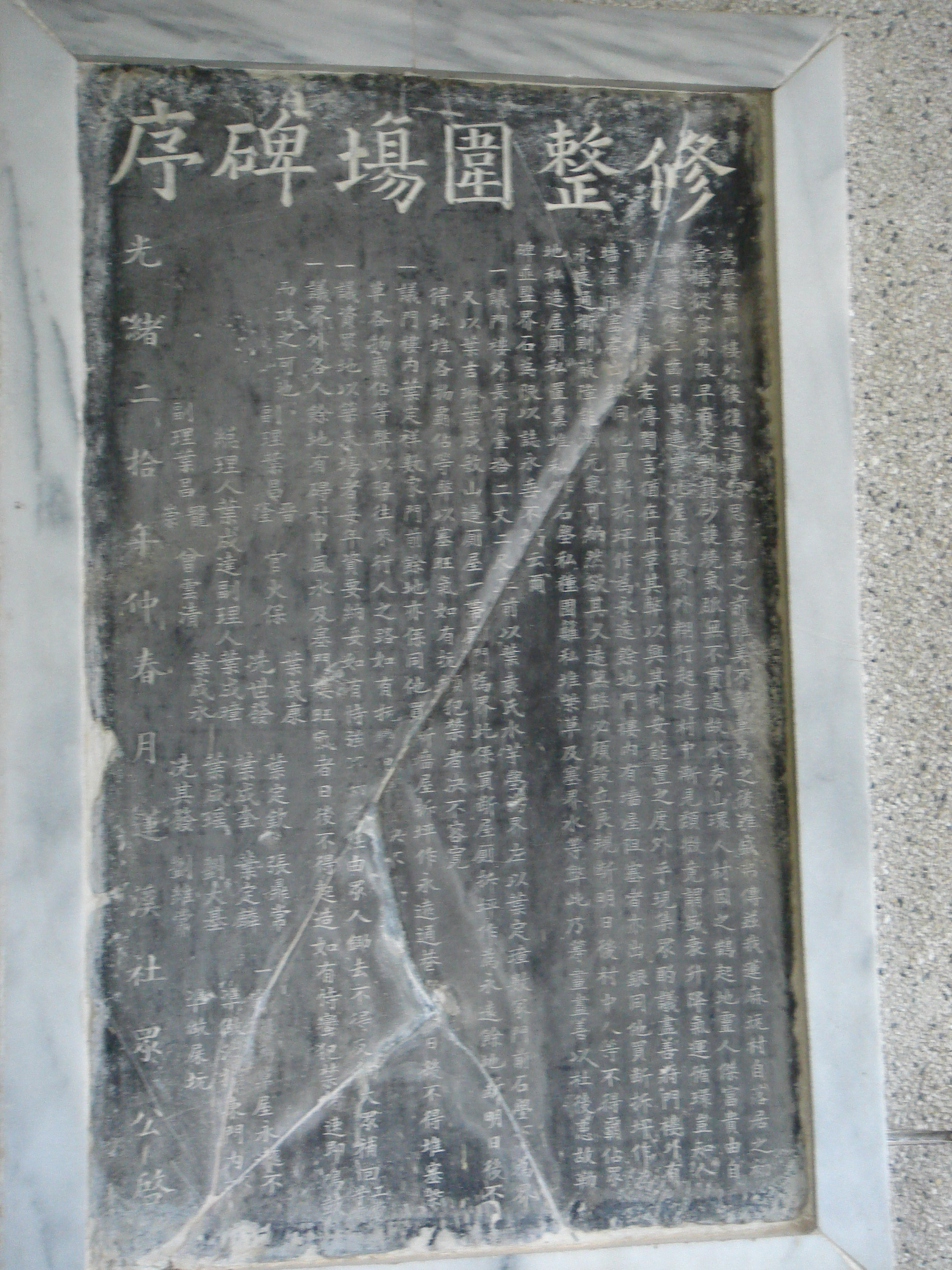
Black memorial tablet

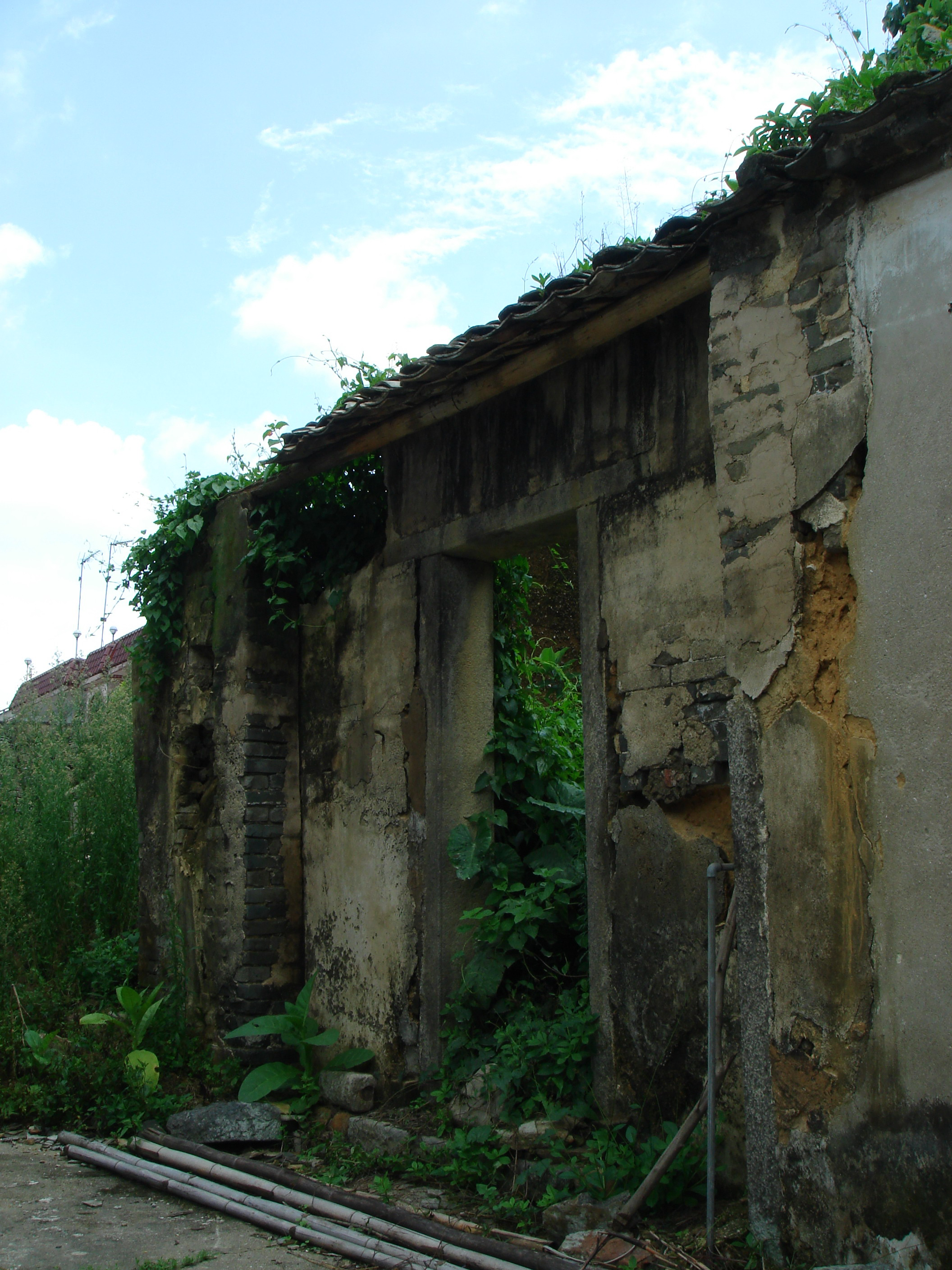
Abandoned house

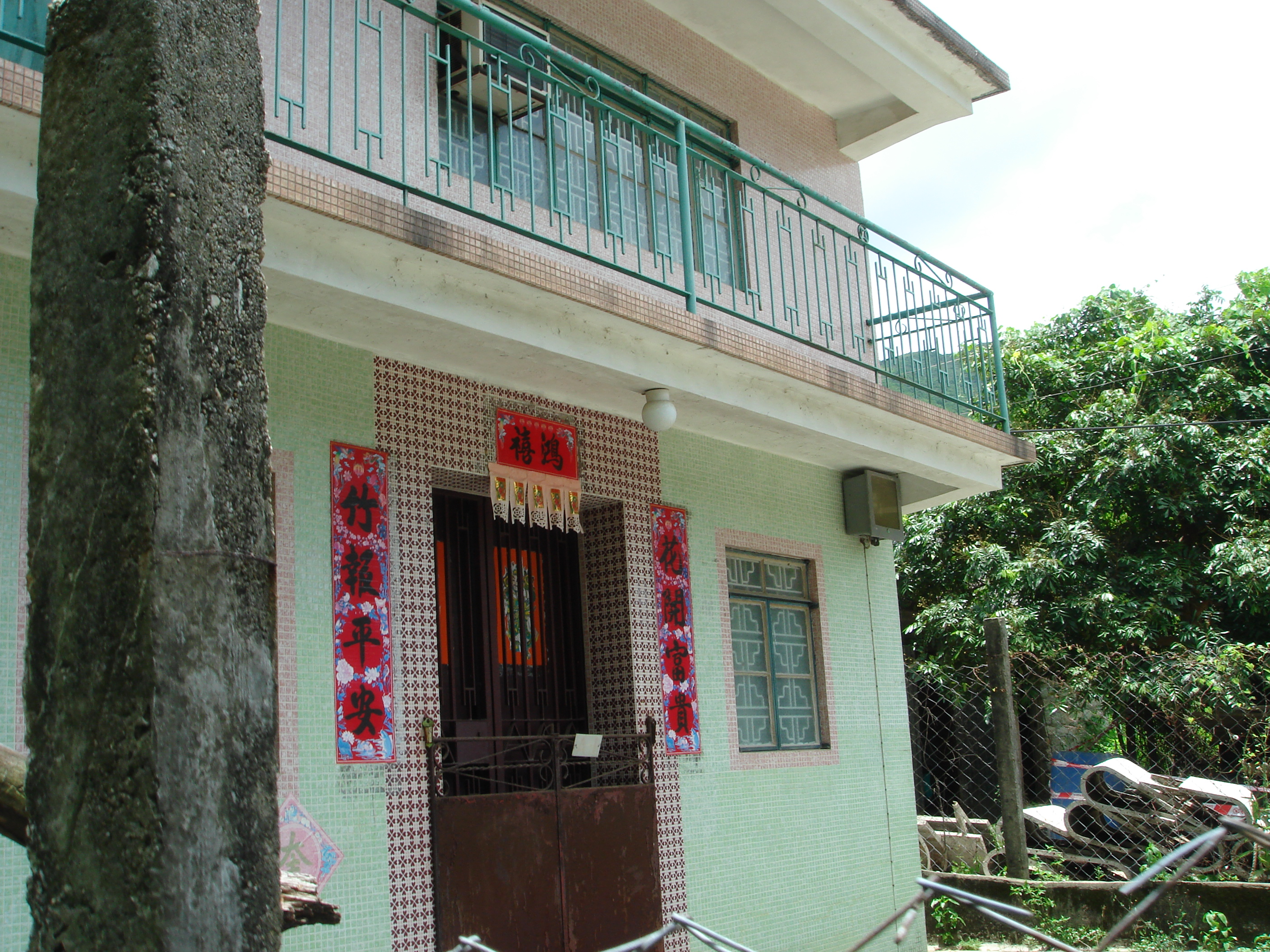

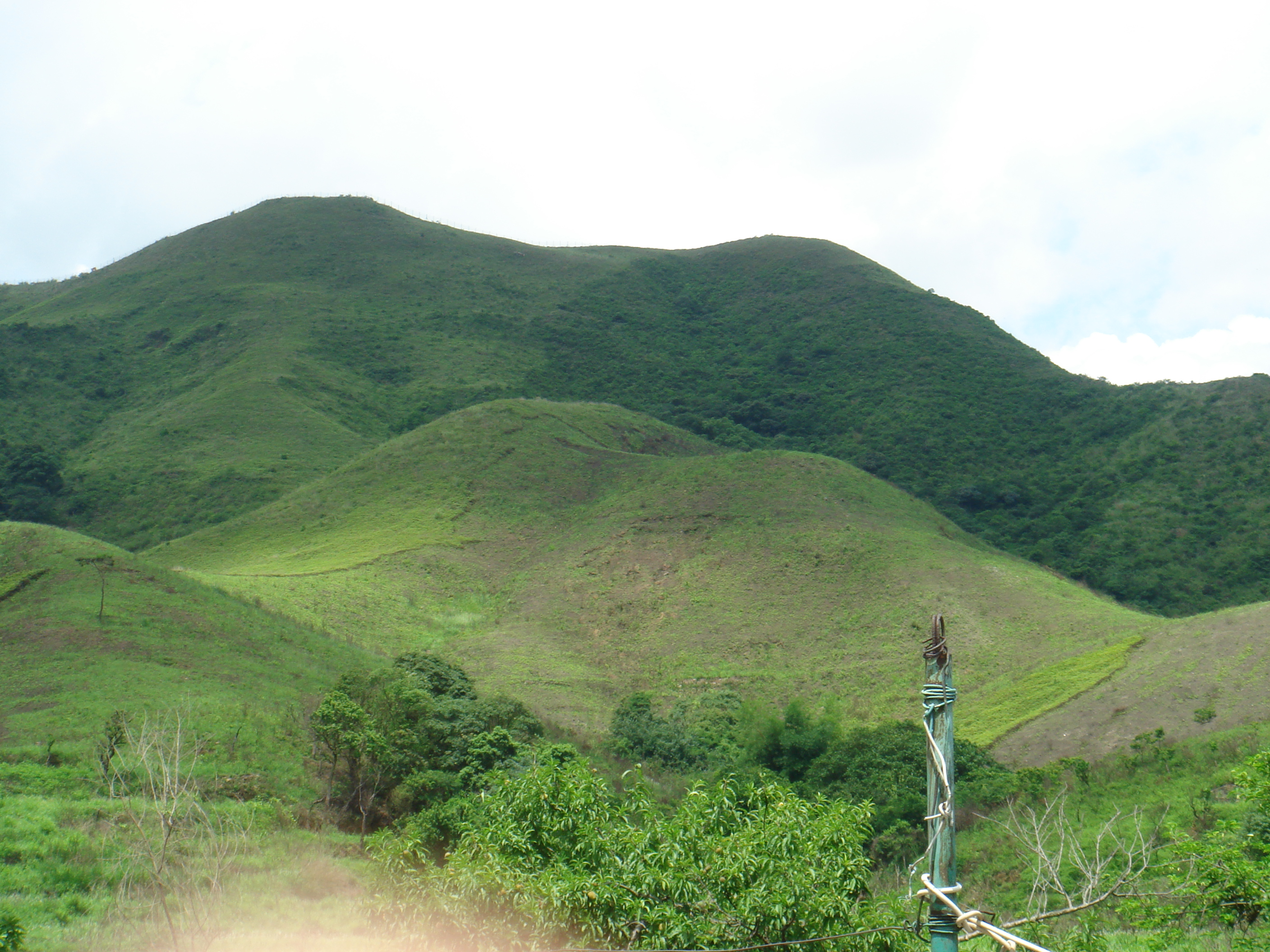

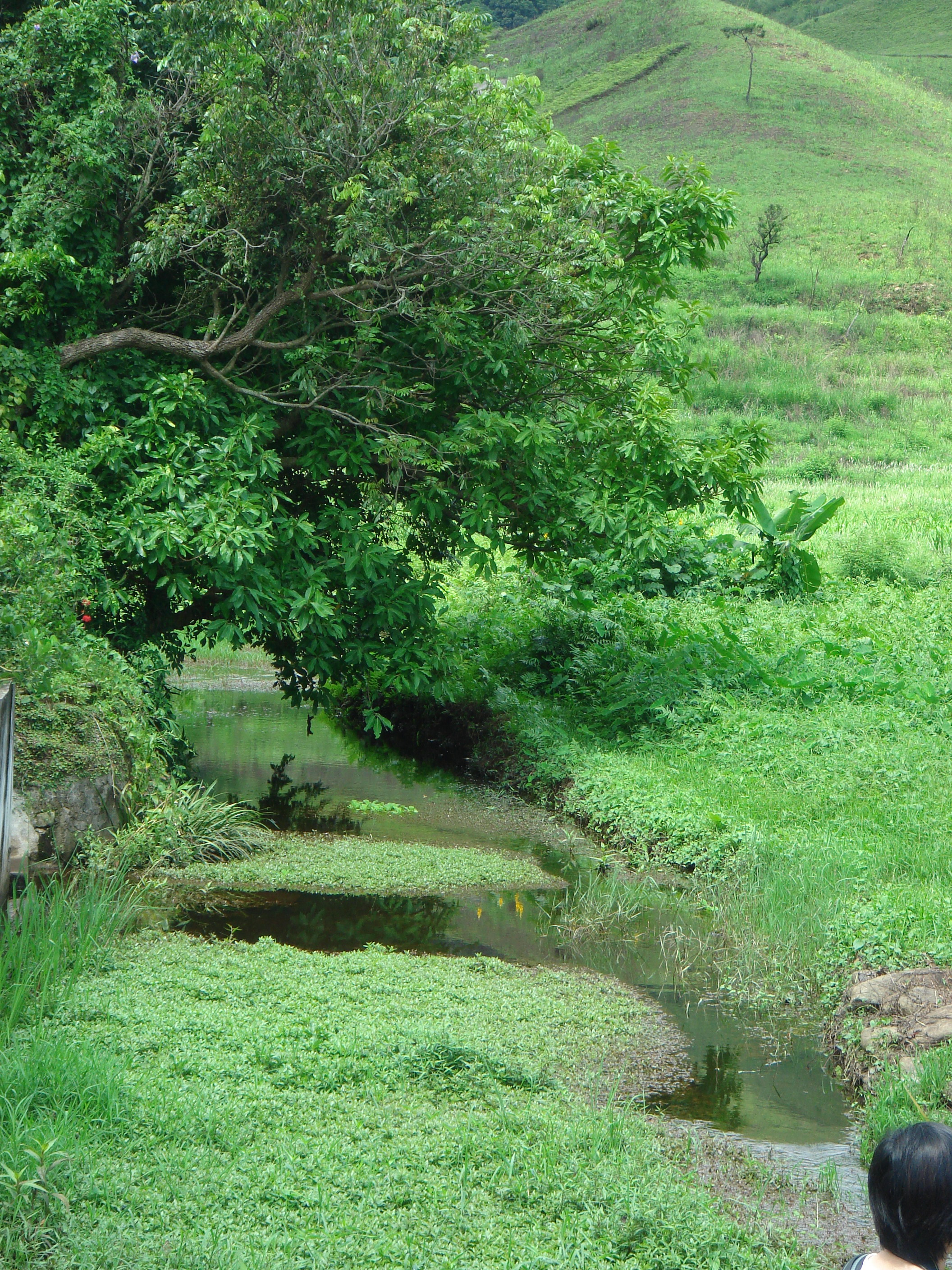

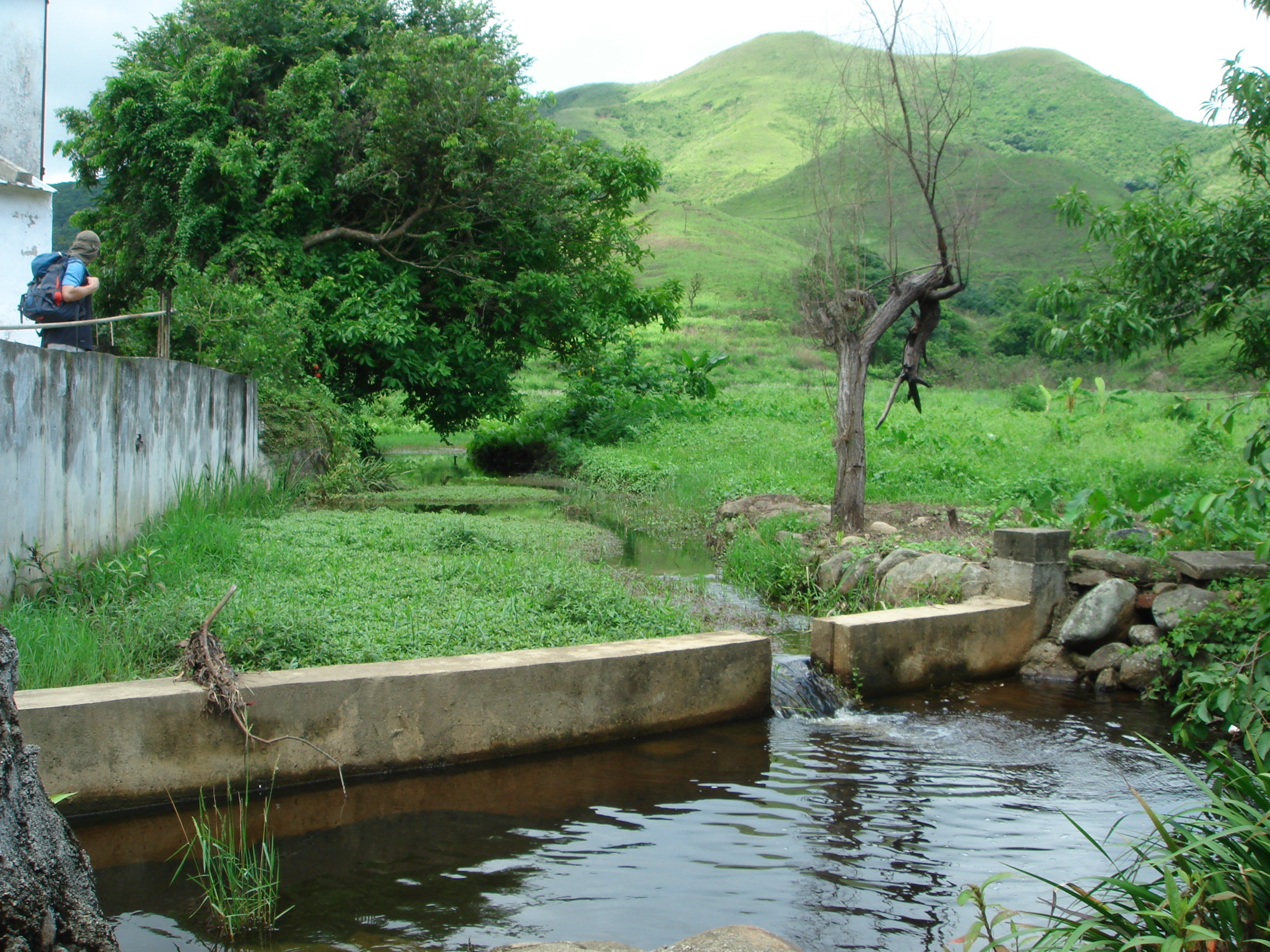

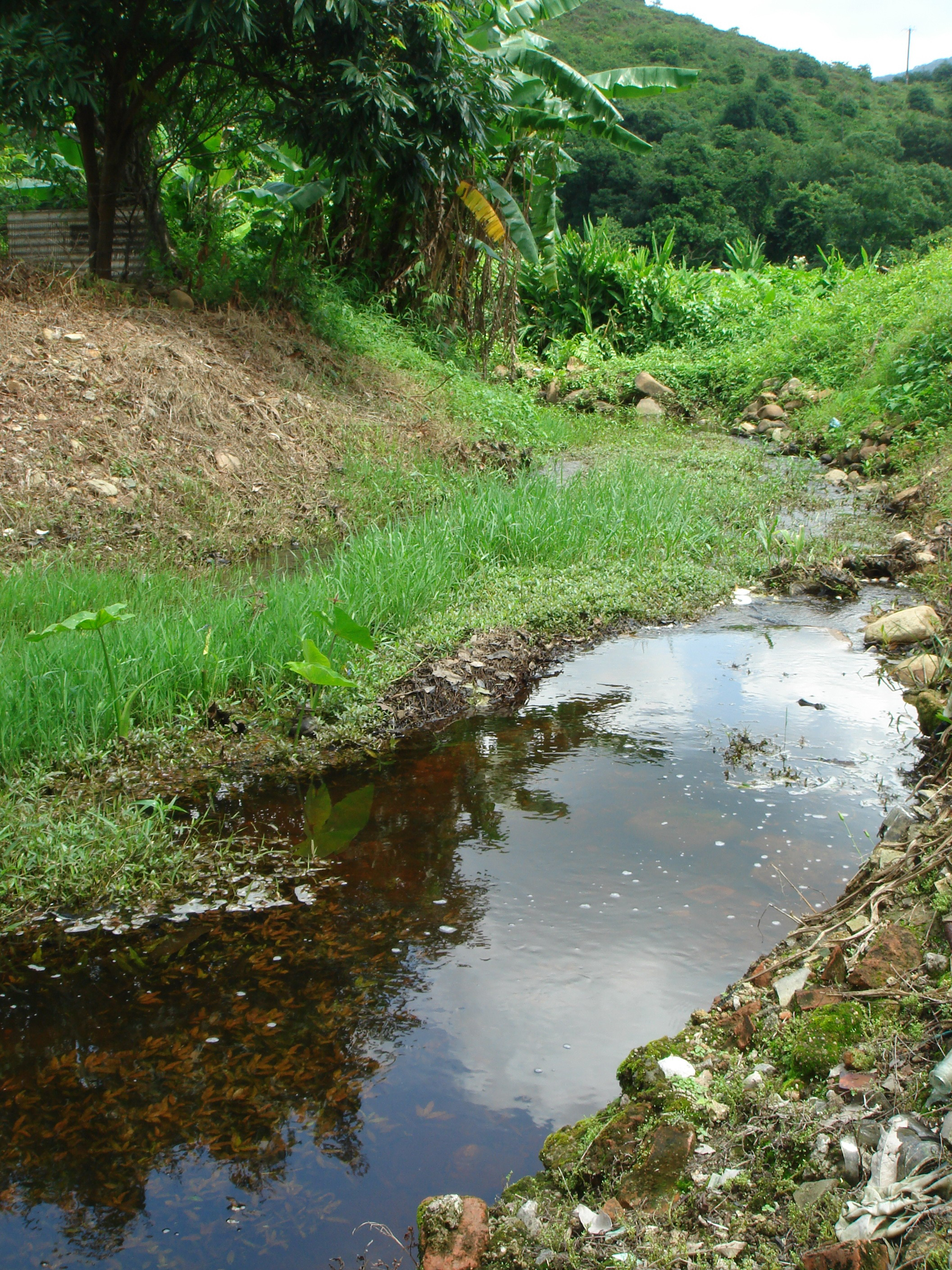

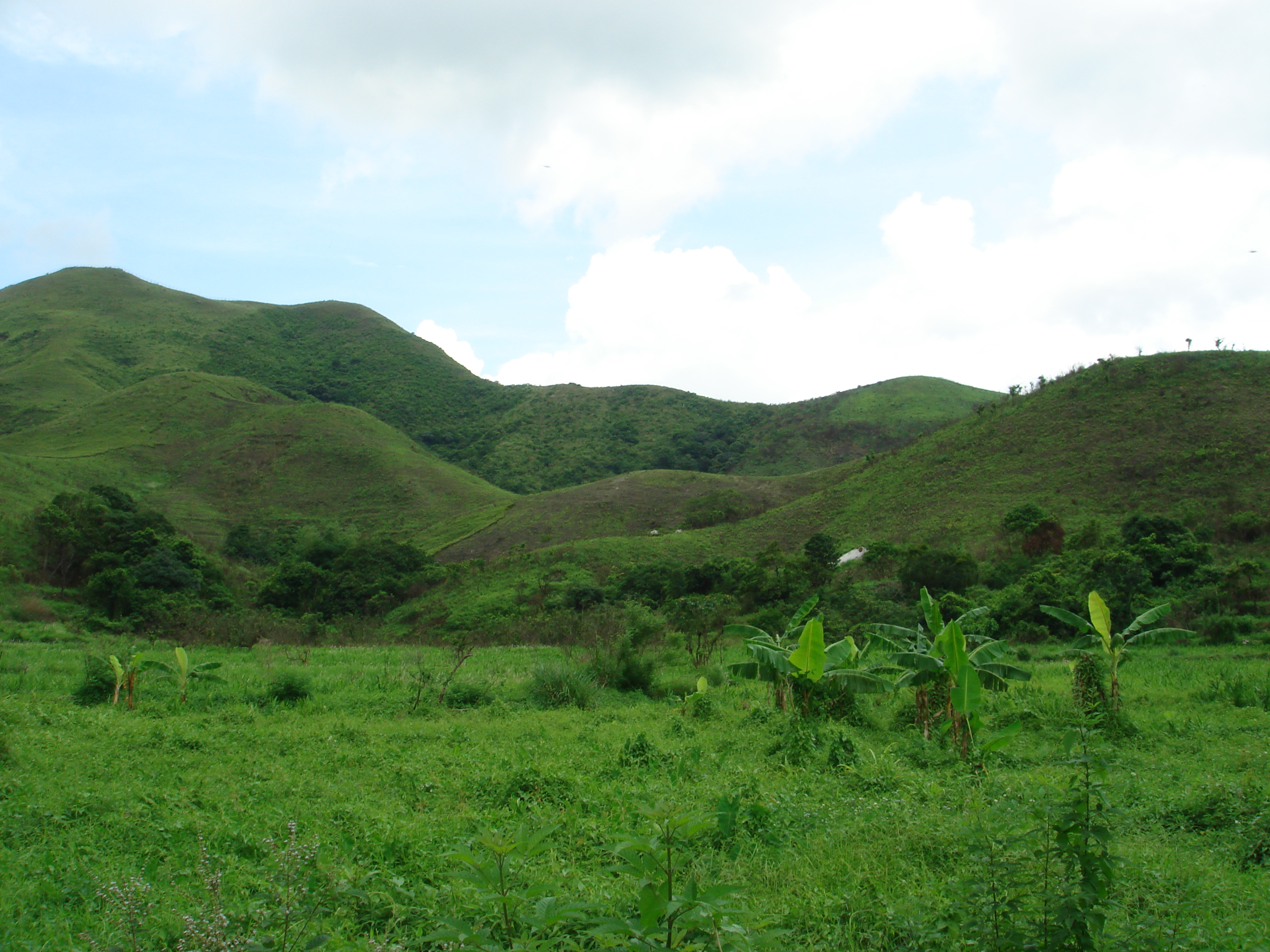

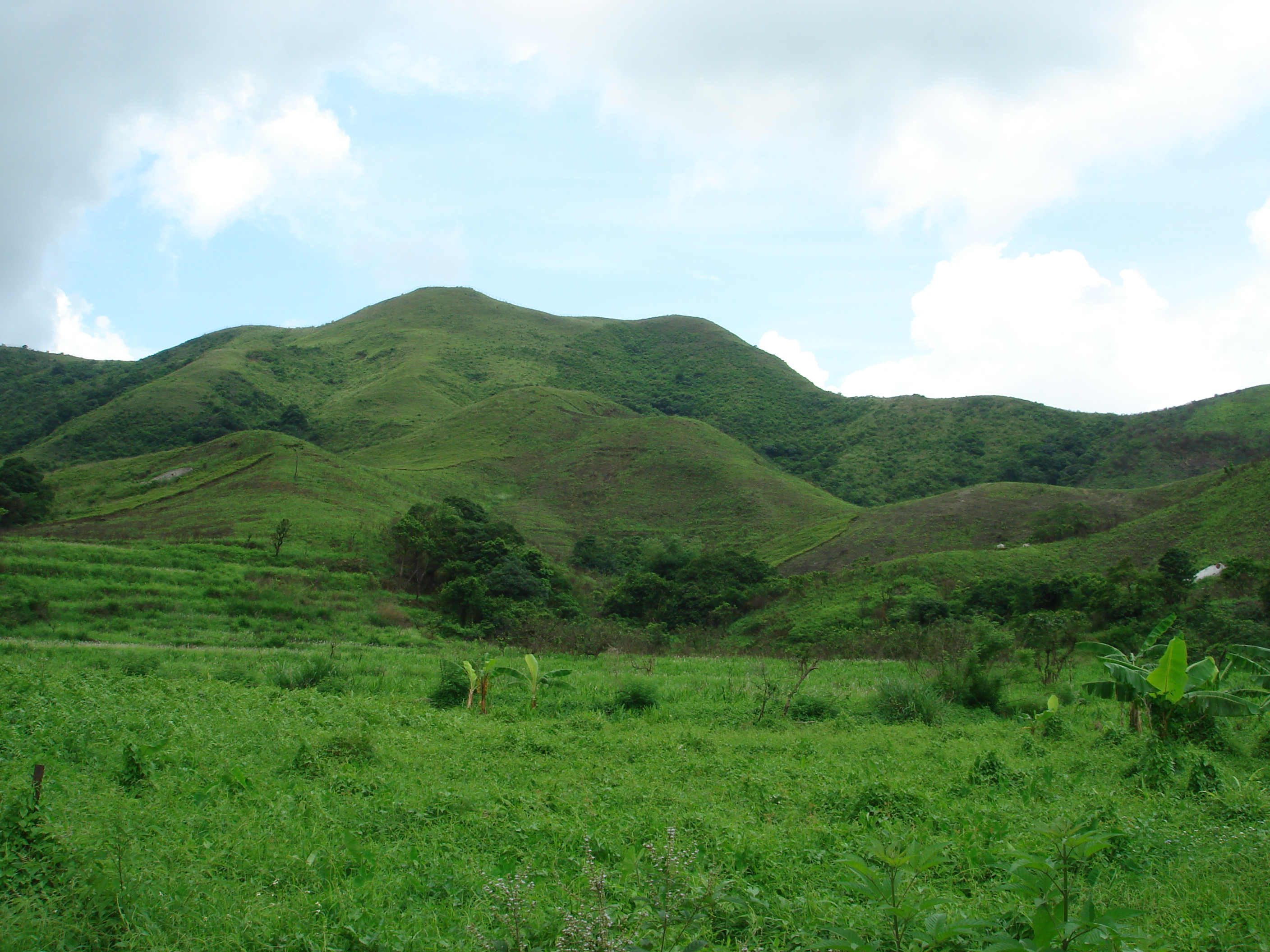

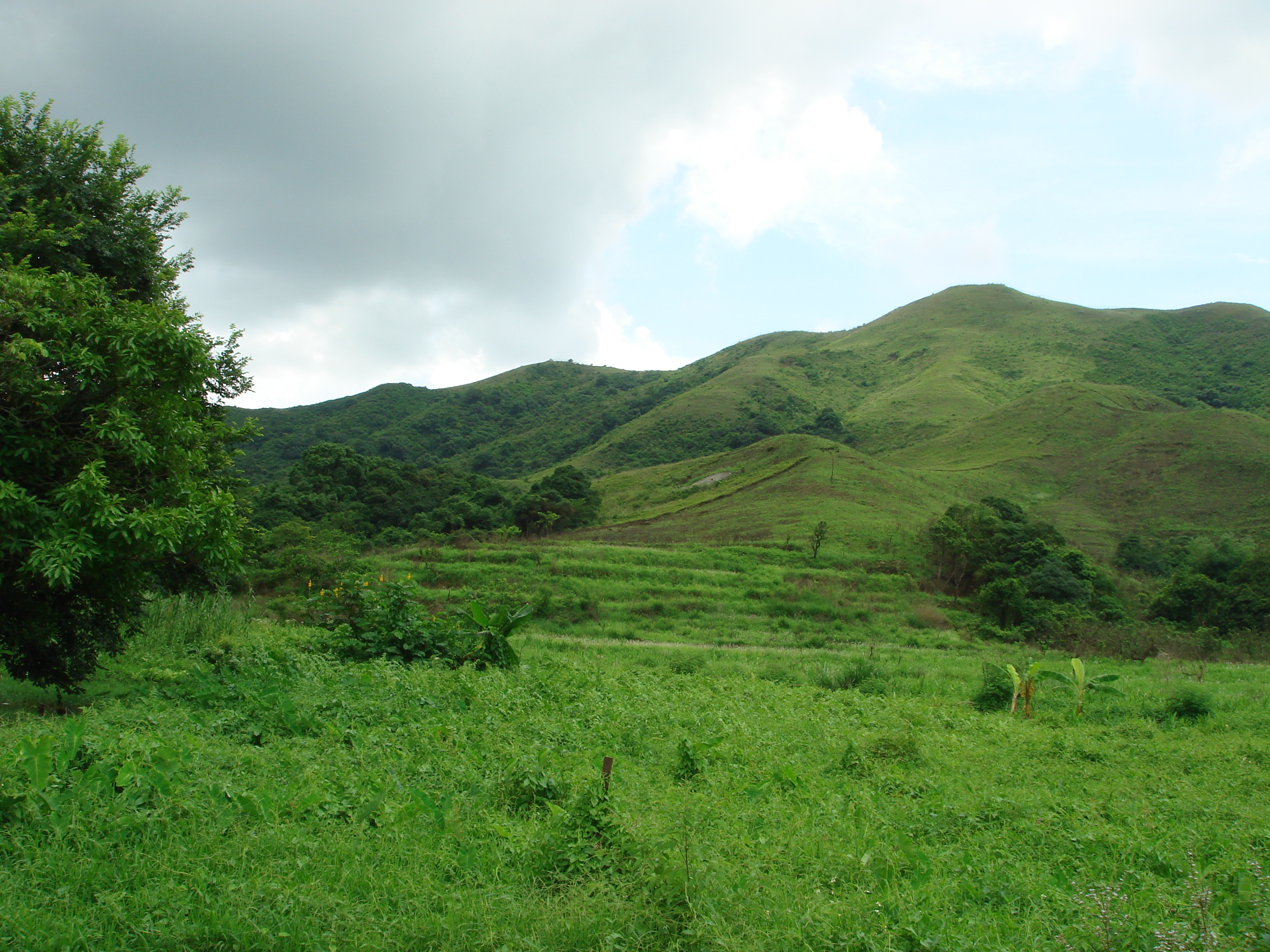

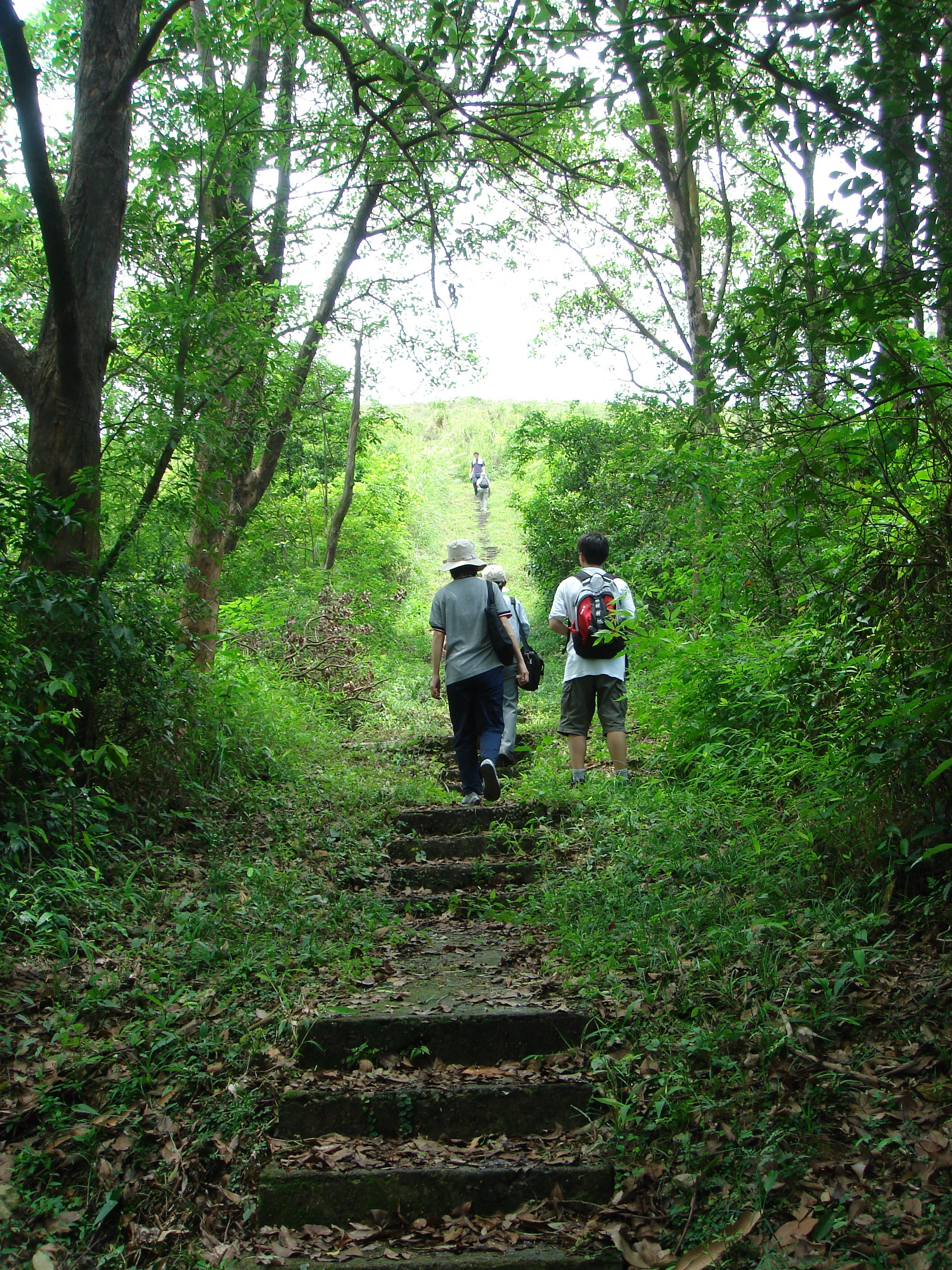

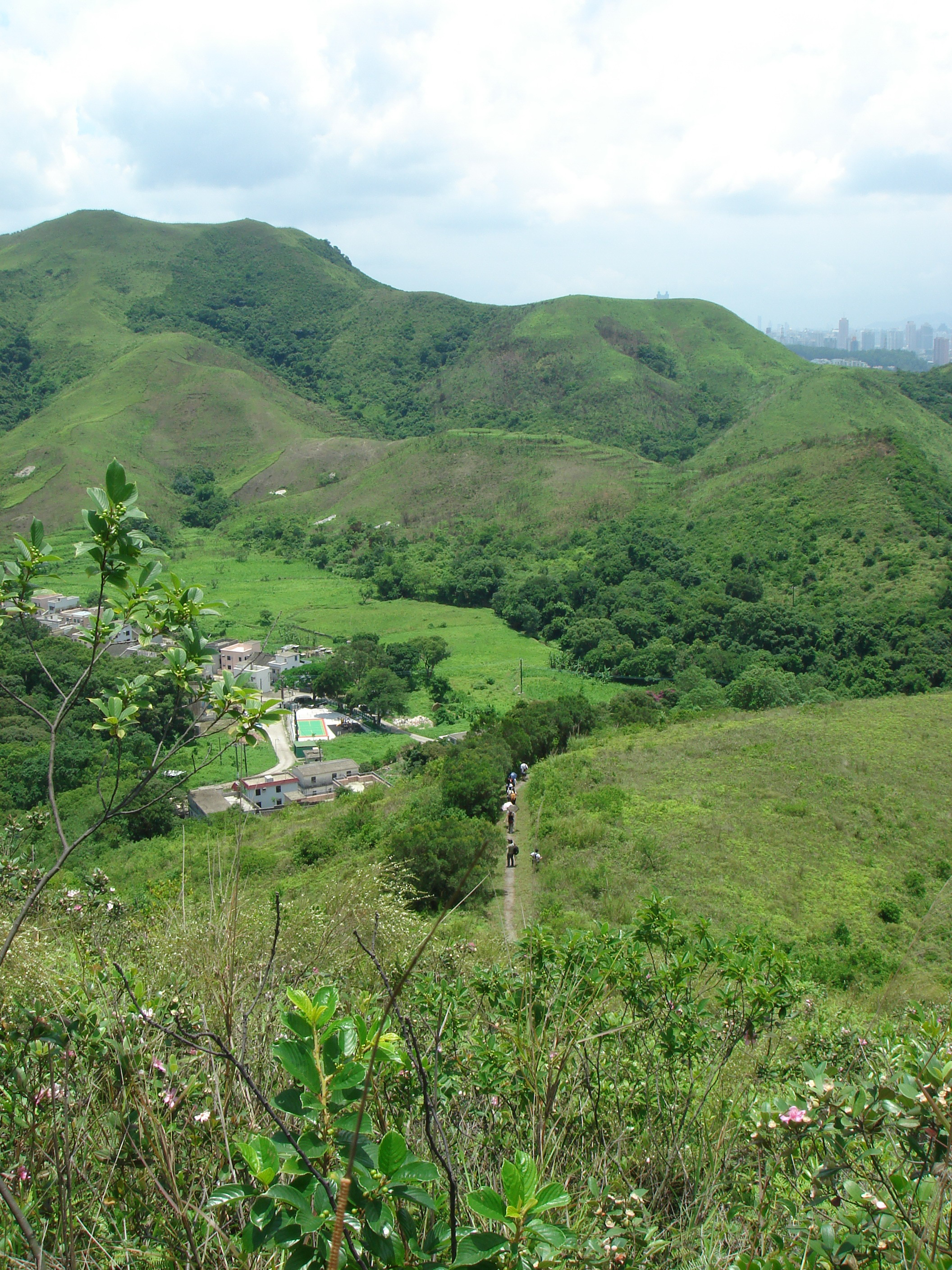
Overlooking Lin Ma Hang Village
