= Lei Uk =

Lei Uk or Lei Uk Tsuen is the name or part of the name of several villages in Hong Kong:

- Lei Uk Tsuen (North District) in Ta Kwu Ling, North District
- Lei Uk Tsuen (Sha Tin District) in Tai Wai, Sha Tin District
- Lei Uk Tsuen or Lee Uk Tsuen in Ha Tsuen, Yuen Long District
