= Tang Ancestral Hall =

Tang Ancestral Hall may refer to a number of ancestral shrines of the Tang Clan, including:

- Tang Chung Ling Ancestral Hall
- Tang Ancestral Hall (Ha Tsuen)
- Tang Ancestral Hall (Ping Shan)
