= Ha Tsuen (constituency) =

Hong Kong constituency

- Elected constituency for the Yuen Long District Council
- Boundary of Ha Tsuen in Yuen Long District
- District: Yuen Long
- Legislative Council constituency: New Territories North
- Population: 15,332 (2019)
- Electorate: 7,739 (2019)

Current constituency
- Created: 1994
- Number of members: One
- Member: Tang Ka-leung (Nonpartisan)

Ha Tsuen (Chinese: 廈村) is one of the 39 constituencies in the Yuen Long District of Hong Kong.

The constituency returns one district councillor to the Yuen Long District Council, with an election every four years. Ha Tsuen constituency is loosely based on Deep Bay Grove, Galore Garden, Ha Pak Nai, Ha Tsuen Shi, Kau Lee Uk Tsuen, Parkview Garden, San Lee Uk Tsuen, San Wai, Sha Chau Lei and Sheung Pak Nai in Ha Tsuen with estimated population of 15,332.

== Councillors represented ==
Election	Member	Party
1991	Tang Ying-hei	Nonpartisan
1994	Tang Hop-wan	Nonpartisan
1999	Tang Kwan-shing	Nonpartisan
2003	Tang Ka-leung	Nonpartisan

== Election results ==
=== 2010s ===
Yuen Long District Council Election, 2019: Ha Tsuen
Party	Candidate	Votes	%	±%
Nonpartisan	Tang Ka-leung	2,937	58.41	
PfD	Tung Ching-kon	2,091	41.59	
Majority		846	16.82	
Turnout		5,056	65.39	
Nonpartisan hold		Swing		
