= MacIntosh Forts =

Seven observation posts in Hong Kong

- Traditional Chinese: 麥景陶碉堡
Transcriptions
Standard Mandarin
- Hanyu Pinyin: Mài jǐng táo diāobǎo
Yue: Cantonese
- Yale Romanization: Mahk gíng tòuh dīu bóu
- Jyutping: Mak6 ging2 tou4 diu1 bou2

The MacIntosh Forts are a group of seven observation posts built in Hong Kong between 1949 and 1953 at the border with China, to safeguard the border against illegal immigrants, when there was an influx of refugees from China due to political instability. The Forts were named after Hong Kong Police Commissioner Duncan Macintosh (in office 1946–1953) who decided to build a chain of observation posts guarded day and night. They have been listed as Grade II historic buildings since 1997.

== Description ==
The MacIntosh Forts were built along the Sham Chun River when an influx of Chinese refugees was followed by border incidents of armed clashes between the police and refugees. Amongst the refugees were the defeated remnants of the Kuomintang Nationalist armies and also a "fair number of common criminals". The Forts were built in reinforced concrete of the same style and of very similar design, which may be categorised as Modern Utilitarian. Built on hilltops at strategic spots, with a view across the border, they were dubbed the Macintosh Cathedrals because of their distinctive appearance and outline against the skyline. Six out of the seven Forts are now remotely controlled. They are not open to public.

== List ==
The seven observation posts are located in a chain, covering most parts of the land frontier. They are from east to west:

Location	Notes/References	Photographs
Pak Kung Au (伯公坳), Sha Tau Kok, North District	The second highest among the 7 Forts, with 722 steps to reach it.	
Kong Shan (礦山), Lin Ma Hang, North District	The highest among the 7 Forts, with 917 steps leading up to it. It cannot be controlled remotely and a police constable is still deployed on it every night. Its elevation is over 700 feet above sea level.	
Pak Fu Shan (白虎山), Lin Ma Hang, North District	This fort, together with three nearby pillboxes and the Pak Fa Shan Operation Base (Ta Kwu Ling Division), formed part of the border defence system.	
Nga Yiu (瓦窰), Ta Kwu Ling, North District	It is located near Lo Shue Ling.	
Nam Hang (南坑), Ta Kwu Ling, North District	It is located near Lo Wu.	
Ma Tso Lung (馬草壟), Lok Ma Chau, North District	One of the two forts not located within the Frontier Closed Area. It is near to Ma Tso Lung.	
Pak Hok Chau (白鶴洲), Mai Po, Yuen Long District	One of the two forts not located within the Frontier Closed Area. It is near to Mai Po Nature Reserve and has played an important role in intercepting illegal immigrants coming from the Deep Bay.	

== Photo Gallery ==
Other photos of the forts

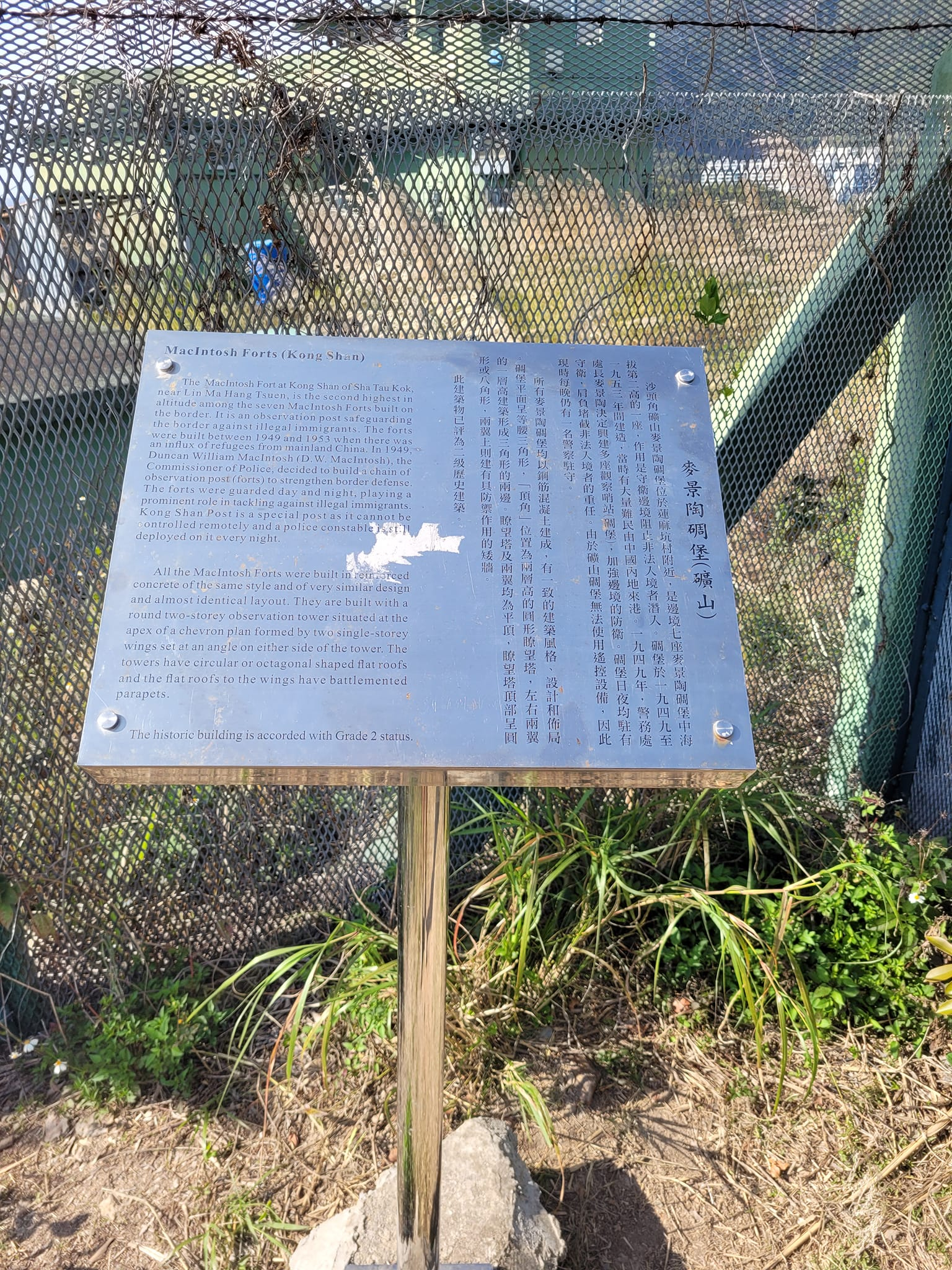
Sign for the MacIntosh Fort at Kong Shan, Lin Ma Hang

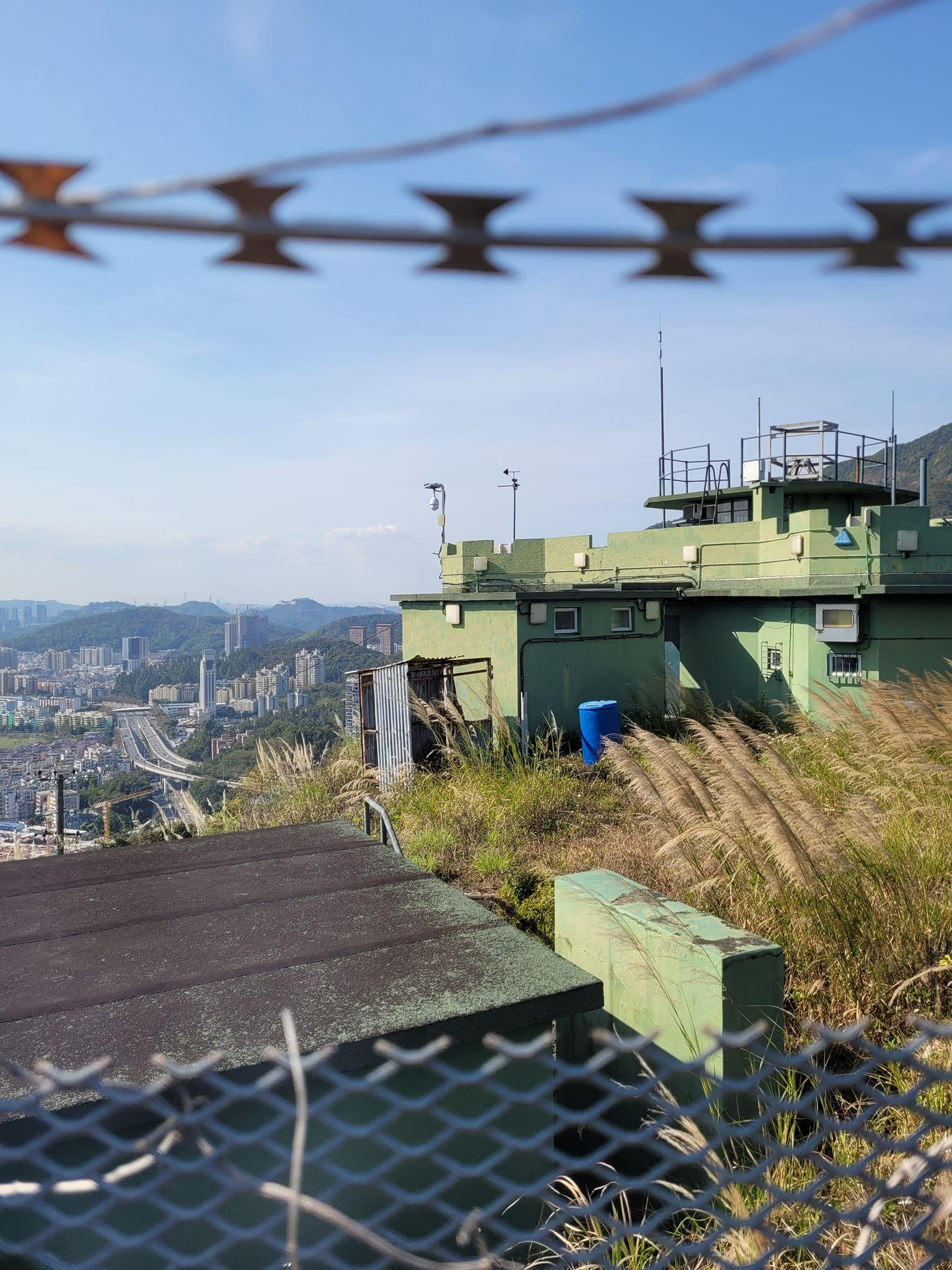
MacIntosh Fort at Kong Shan, Lin Ma Hang overlooking Shenzhen

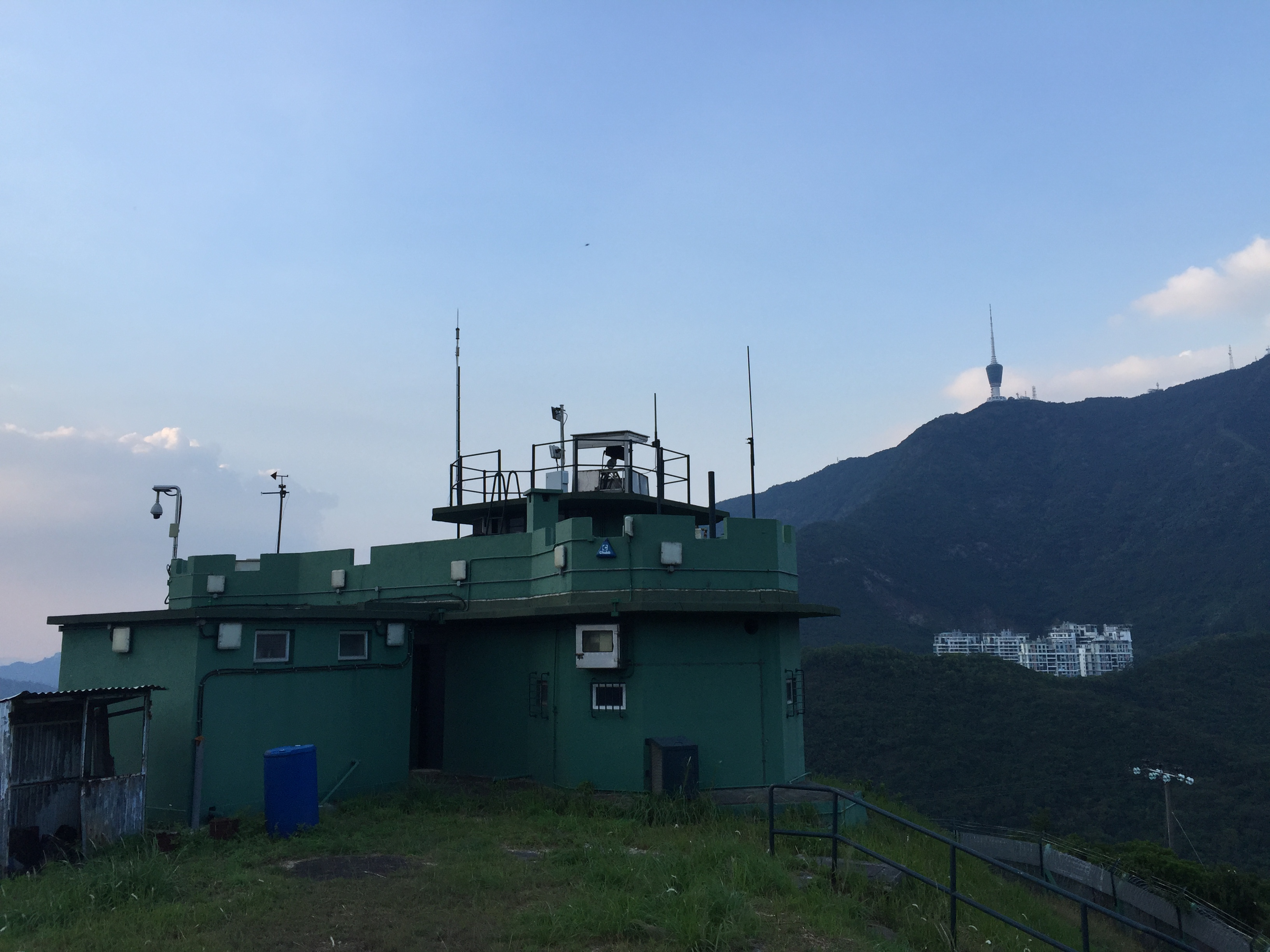
MacIntosh Fort at Kong Shan

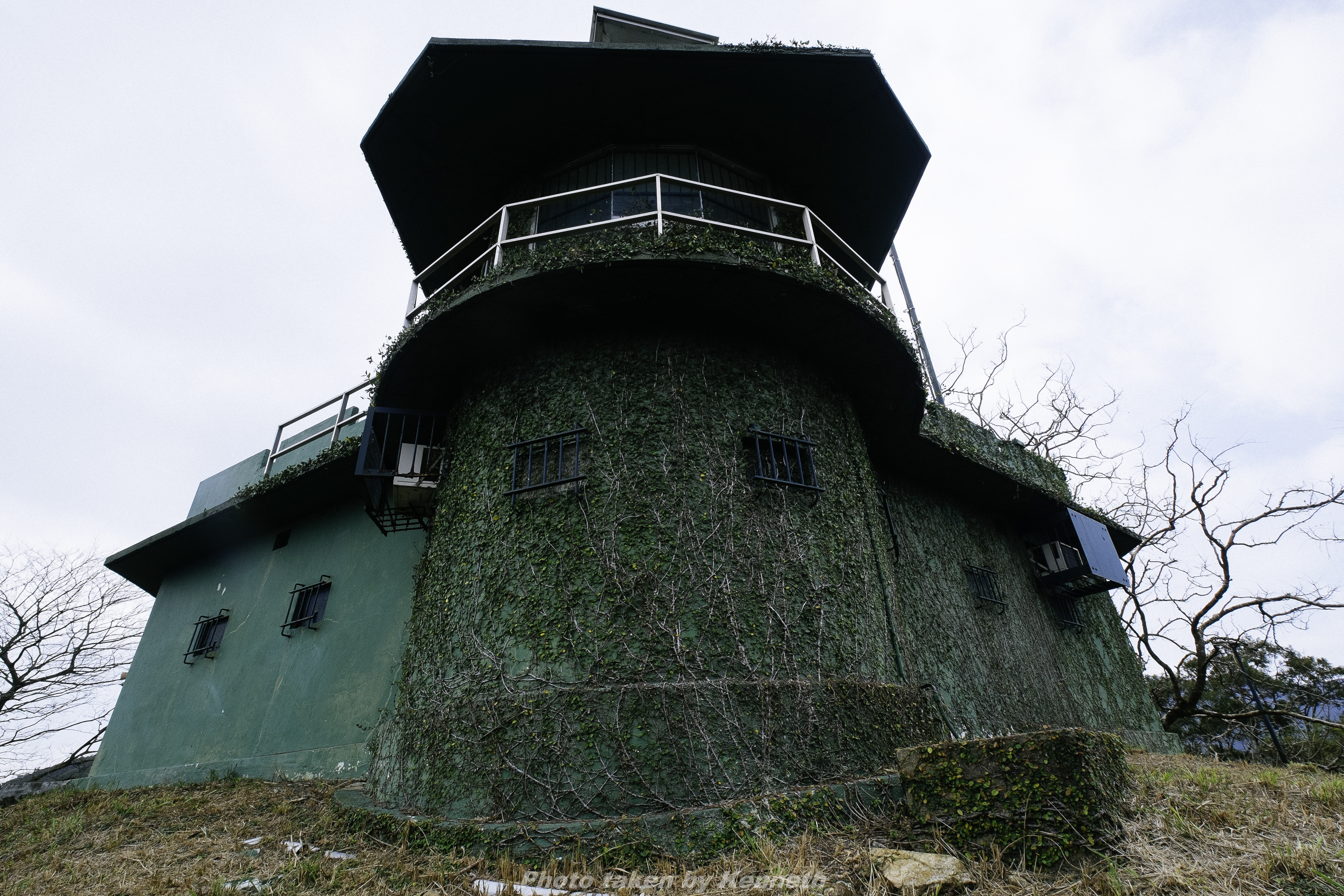
MacIntosh Fort at Pak Kung Au

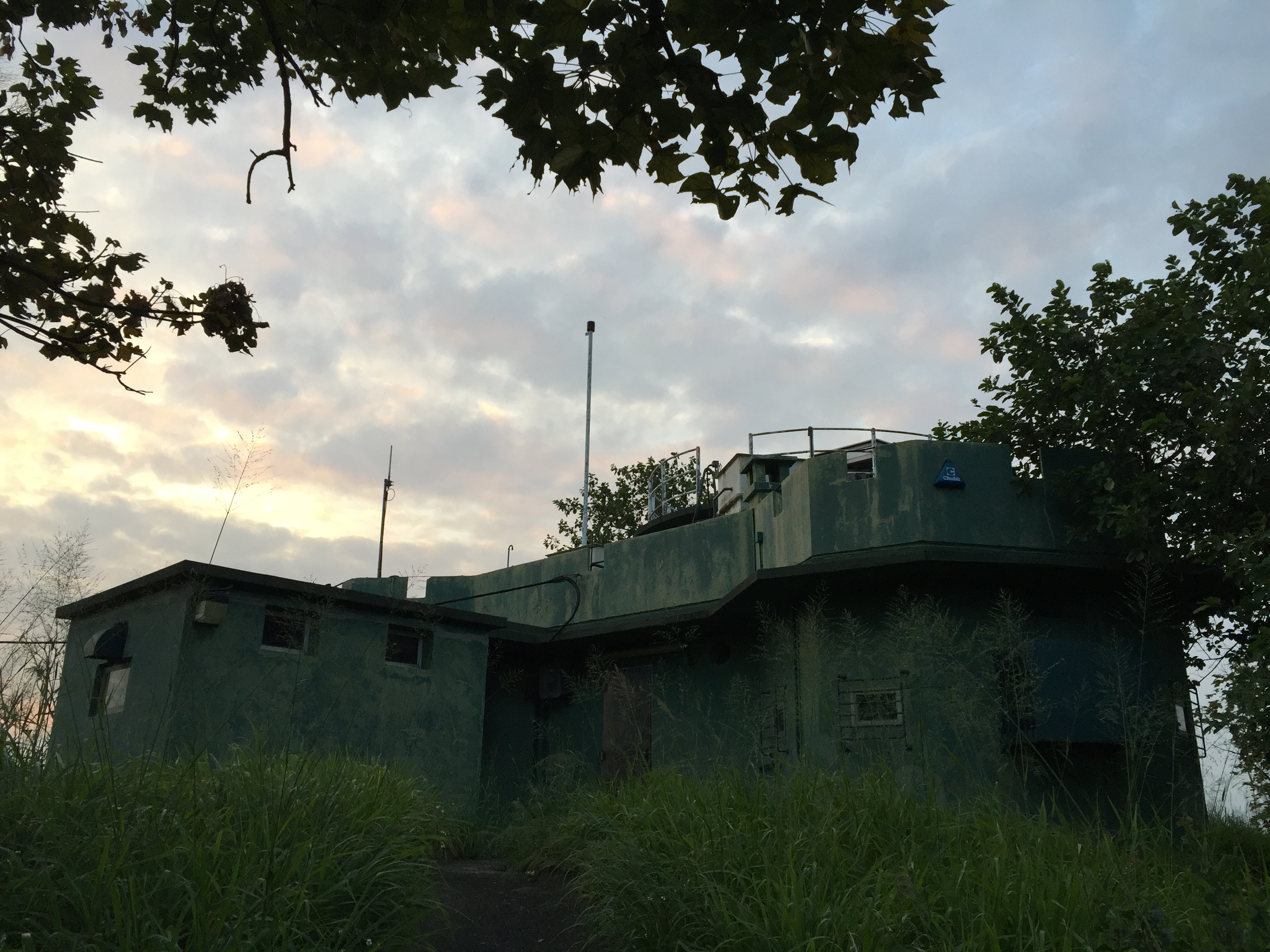
MacIntosh Fort at Ma Tso Lung

== See also ==
- Historic police buildings in Hong Kong
