= Ta Kwu Ling =

Area in Hong Kong

Coordinates: 22.5392°N 114.1616°E

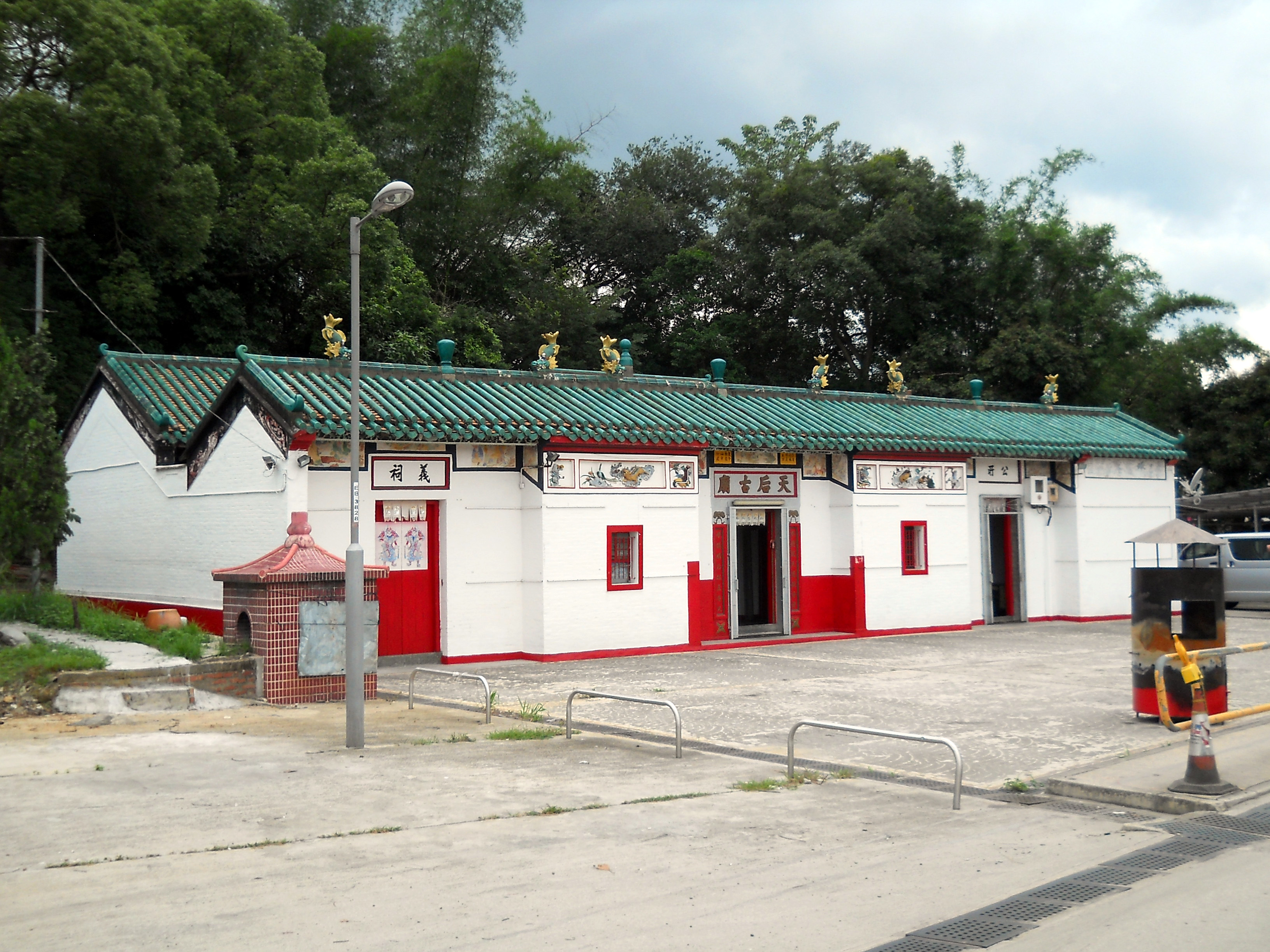
- Tin Hau Temple in Ping Che, Ta Kwu Ling
- Traditional Chinese: 打鼓嶺
- Simplified Chinese: 打鼓岭
Transcriptions
Standard Mandarin
- Hanyu Pinyin: Dǎgǔlǐng
- Wade–Giles: Ta-ku-ling
Yue: Cantonese
- Yale Romanization: Dáa gú líhng
- Jyutping: Daa2 gu2 ling5

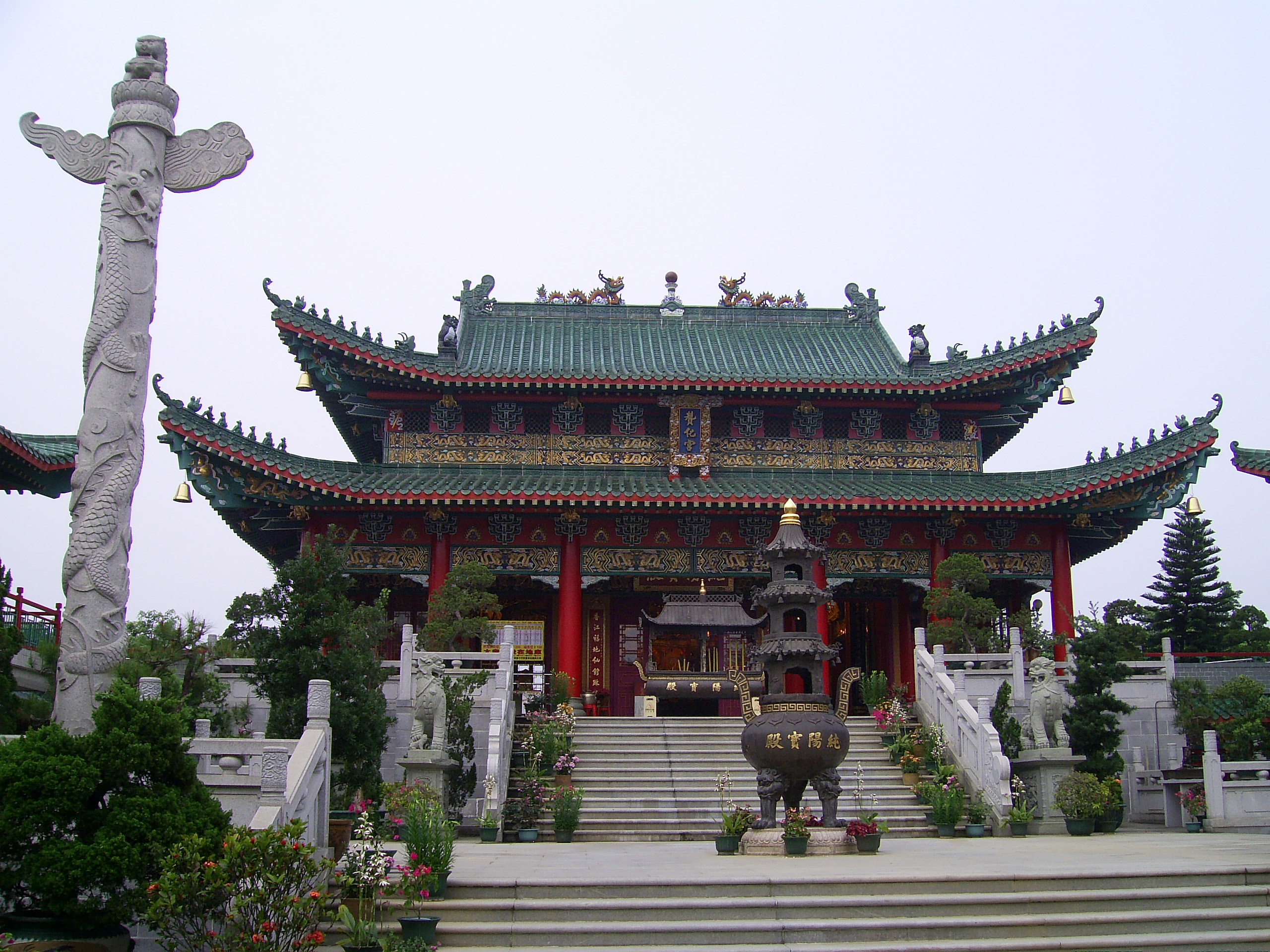
Main hall of Wun Chuen Sin Koon, a Taoist temple in Ta Kwu Ling

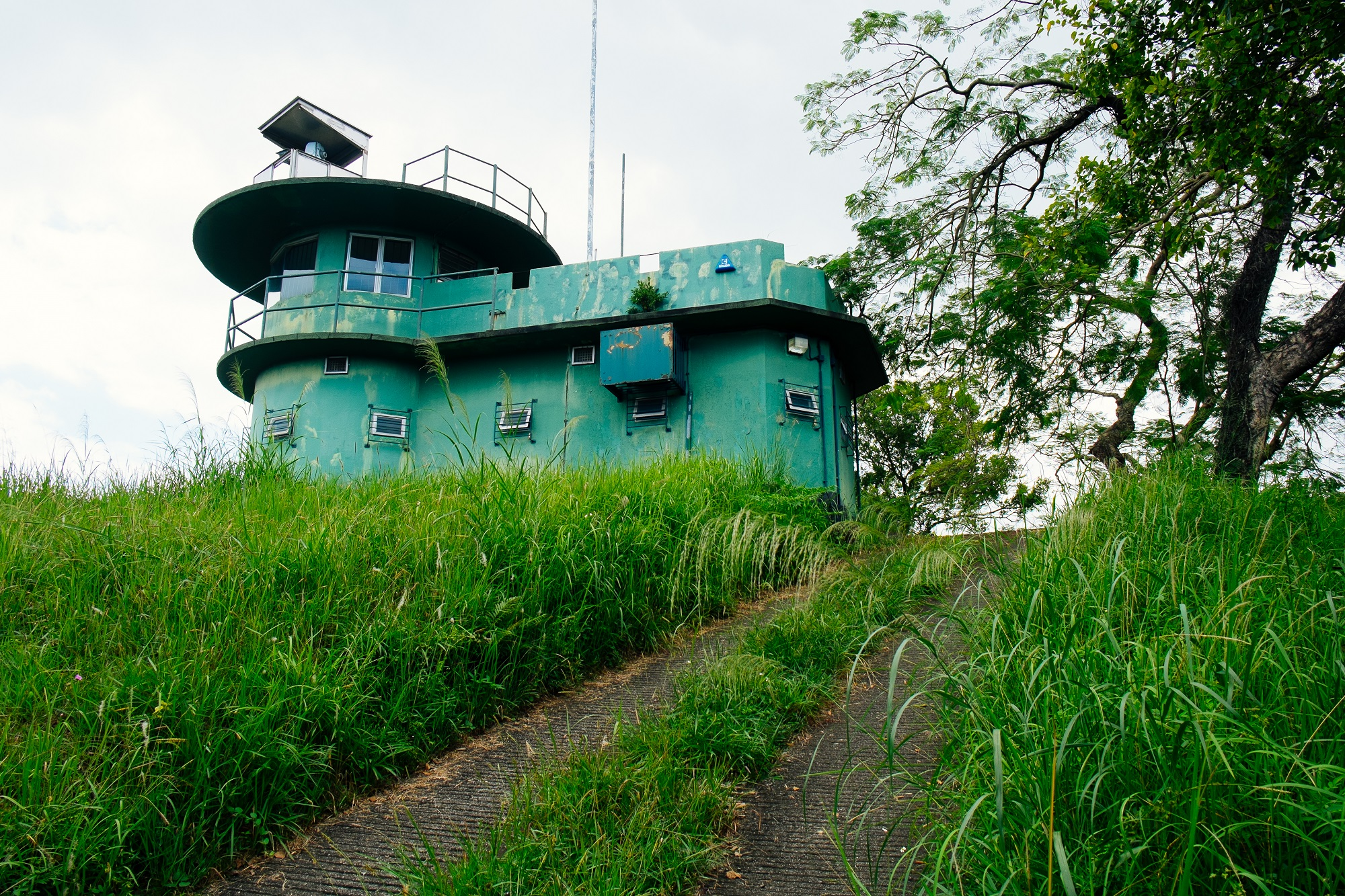
MacIntosh Fort near Nga Yiu.

Ta Kwu Ling is an area in the North District, New Territories, Hong Kong, located northeast of Sheung Shui, close to the border with mainland China and south of Liantang Subdistrict in Shenzhen.

Before 4 January 2016, parts of Ta Kwu Ling fell within the Frontier Closed Area and a Closed Area Permit was required.

Ta Kwu Ling is one of three new development areas currently being planned for North District, in parallel with Fanling North and Kwu Tung North.

== Administration ==
For electoral purposes, Ta Kwu Ling is part of the Sha Ta constituency of the North District Council. It is currently represented by Ko Wai-kei, who was elected in the local elections.

== Villages ==
The following villages are part of the Ta Kwu Ling District Rural Committee:

- Chow Tin Tsuen
- Chuk Yuen
- Fung Wong Wu
- Ha Shan Kai Wat
- Heung Yuen Wai
- Kan Tau Wai
- Lei Uk
- Lo Wu
- Muk Wu
- Nga Yiu
- Nga Yiu Ha
- Ping Che
- Ping Yeung
- San Uk Ling
- Sheung Shan Kai Wat
- Tai Po Tin
- Tak Yuet Lau
- Tong Fong
- Tsung Yuen Ha
- Wo Keng Shan

== Features ==
One of the three strategic landfills in use in Hong Kong is located in Ta Kwu Ling.

== Education ==
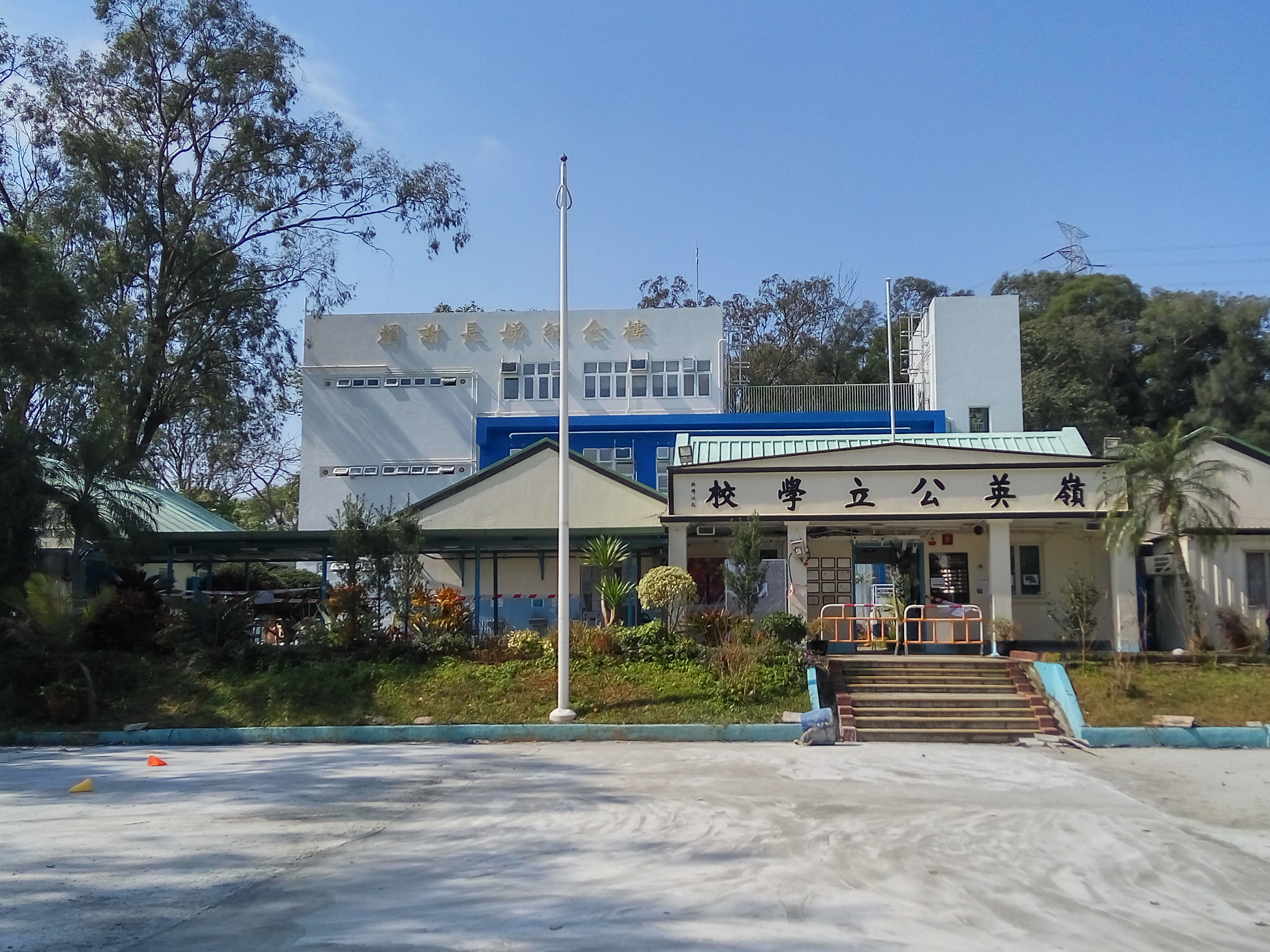
Ta Ku Ling Ying Public School (打鼓嶺嶺英公立學校)

Ta Ku Ling is in Primary One Admission (POA) School Net 81. Within the school net are multiple aided schools (operated independently but funded with government money); no government schools are in the net.

Ta Ku Ling Ying Public School (打鼓嶺嶺英公立學校) is in Ta Kwu Ling. In 2013 it had one class per year, but it was scheduled to have four primary 1 classes with a total of 128 students the following year. In 2013 the school was receiving an expansion including classrooms, a library, and a teachers' room due to an increase in students who are Hong Kong residents living in Shenzhen.

== Transport ==
The area is far from its nearest major road, Sha Tau Kok Road, connecting Fanling to Sha Tau Kok. Branch roads connect to the major road via the Ping Che area in the south.

== Climate ==
The name of Ta Kwu Ling is frequently heard in weather reports, since it often experiences the highest and lowest daily temperatures in Hong Kong, due to its inland location. Temperatures near 0 °C (32 °F) occur once every few years, while daily minimum temperatures of 5 °C (41 °F) or less are common during winter.

Climate data for Ta Kwu Ling (1991–2020)
Month	Jan	Feb	Mar	Apr	May	Jun	Jul	Aug	Sep	Oct	Nov	Dec	Year
Record high °C (°F)	28.9 (84.0)	30.0 (86.0)	30.0 (86.0)	33.9 (93.0)	35.7 (96.3)	36.5 (97.7)	37.8 (100.0)	37.2 (99.0)	36.4 (97.5)	34.3 (93.7)	32.7 (90.9)	30.5 (86.9)	39.8 (103.6)
Mean daily maximum °C (°F)	19.7 (67.5)	20.6 (69.1)	22.9 (73.2)	26.5 (79.7)	29.8 (85.6)	31.6 (88.9)	32.6 (90.7)	32.4 (90.3)	31.5 (88.7)	29.2 (84.6)	25.7 (78.3)	21.4 (70.5)	27.0 (80.6)
Daily mean °C (°F)	15.0 (59.0)	16.3 (61.3)	19.1 (66.4)	22.6 (72.7)	25.9 (78.6)	27.8 (82.0)	28.4 (83.1)	28.1 (82.6)	27.2 (81.0)	24.7 (76.5)	20.9 (69.6)	16.5 (61.7)	22.7 (72.9)
Mean daily minimum °C (°F)	11.3 (52.3)	13.2 (55.8)	16.1 (61.0)	19.7 (67.5)	23.0 (73.4)	24.9 (76.8)	25.3 (77.5)	25.1 (77.2)	24.1 (75.4)	21.2 (70.2)	17.1 (62.8)	12.4 (54.3)	19.5 (67.0)
Record low °C (°F)	−0.9 (30.4)	1.3 (34.3)	4.7 (40.5)	9.3 (48.7)	16.0 (60.8)	16.3 (61.3)	21.1 (70.0)	22.3 (72.1)	16.9 (62.4)	11.1 (52.0)	5.8 (42.4)	0.2 (32.4)	−0.9 (30.4)
Average precipitation mm (inches)	34.6 (1.36)	31.2 (1.23)	52.6 (2.07)	130.6 (5.14)	236.3 (9.30)	370.8 (14.60)	325.1 (12.80)	404.8 (15.94)	237.3 (9.34)	89.4 (3.52)	31.3 (1.23)	30.0 (1.18)	1,974 (77.71)
Average relative humidity (%)	72.7	76.2	78.7	80.7	82.2	83.4	82.7	84.1	80.4	73.9	73.9	69.4	78.2
Source: Hong Kong Observatory

== See also ==
- MacIntosh Forts
