= Nga Yiu =

Village in Ta Kwu Ling, Hong Kong

Coordinates: 22.541297°N 114.137344°E

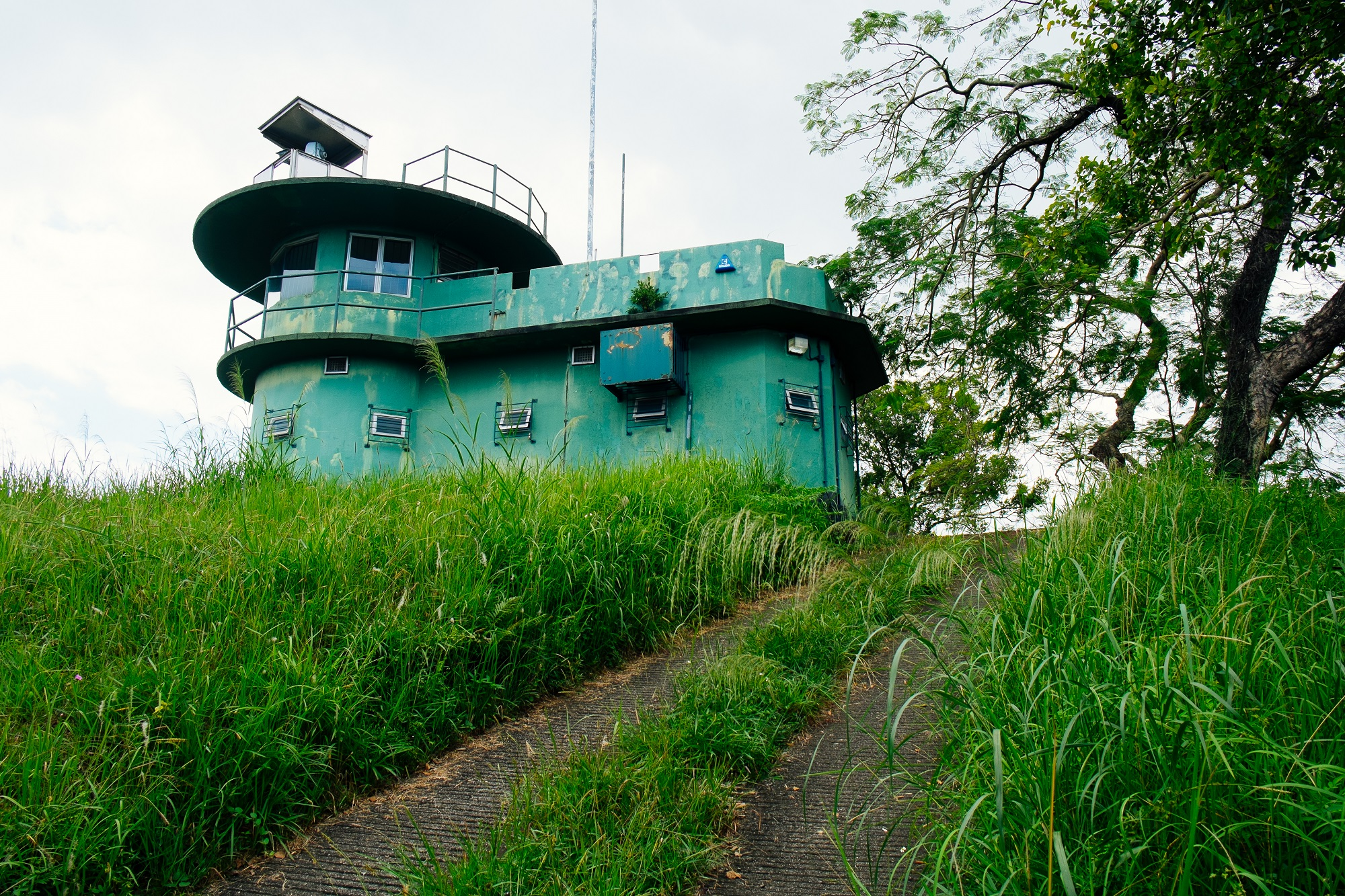
MacIntosh Fort near Nga Yiu.

Nga Yiu (Chinese: 瓦窰) or Muk Wu Nga Yiu (木湖瓦窰) is a village in Ta Kwu Ling, North District, Hong Kong.

== Administration ==
Nga Yiu is a recognized village under the New Territories Small House Policy.

== Features ==
One of the seven MacIntosh Forts of Hong Kong is located at Nga Yiu.

== See also ==
- Muk Wu
