= Ha Shan Kai Wat =

Village in Ta Kwu Ling, Hong Kong

Coordinates: 22.522589°N 114.153312°E

Ha Shan Kai Wat (Chinese: 下山雞乙) is a village in Ta Kwu Ling, North District, Hong Kong.

== Administration ==
Shan Kai Wat is a recognized village under the New Territories Small House Policy.

== See also ==
- Sheung Shan Kai Wat
