= Kan Tau Wai =

Coordinates: 22.539289°N 114.150024°E

Kan Tau Wai (Chinese: 簡頭圍) is a village in Ta Kwu Ling, North District, Hong Kong.

== Administration ==
Kan Tau Wai is a recognized village under the New Territories Small House Policy.
