= Chuk Yuen (North District) =

Village in Ta Kwu Ling, Hong Kong

Coordinates: 22.5457048°N 114.1553587°E

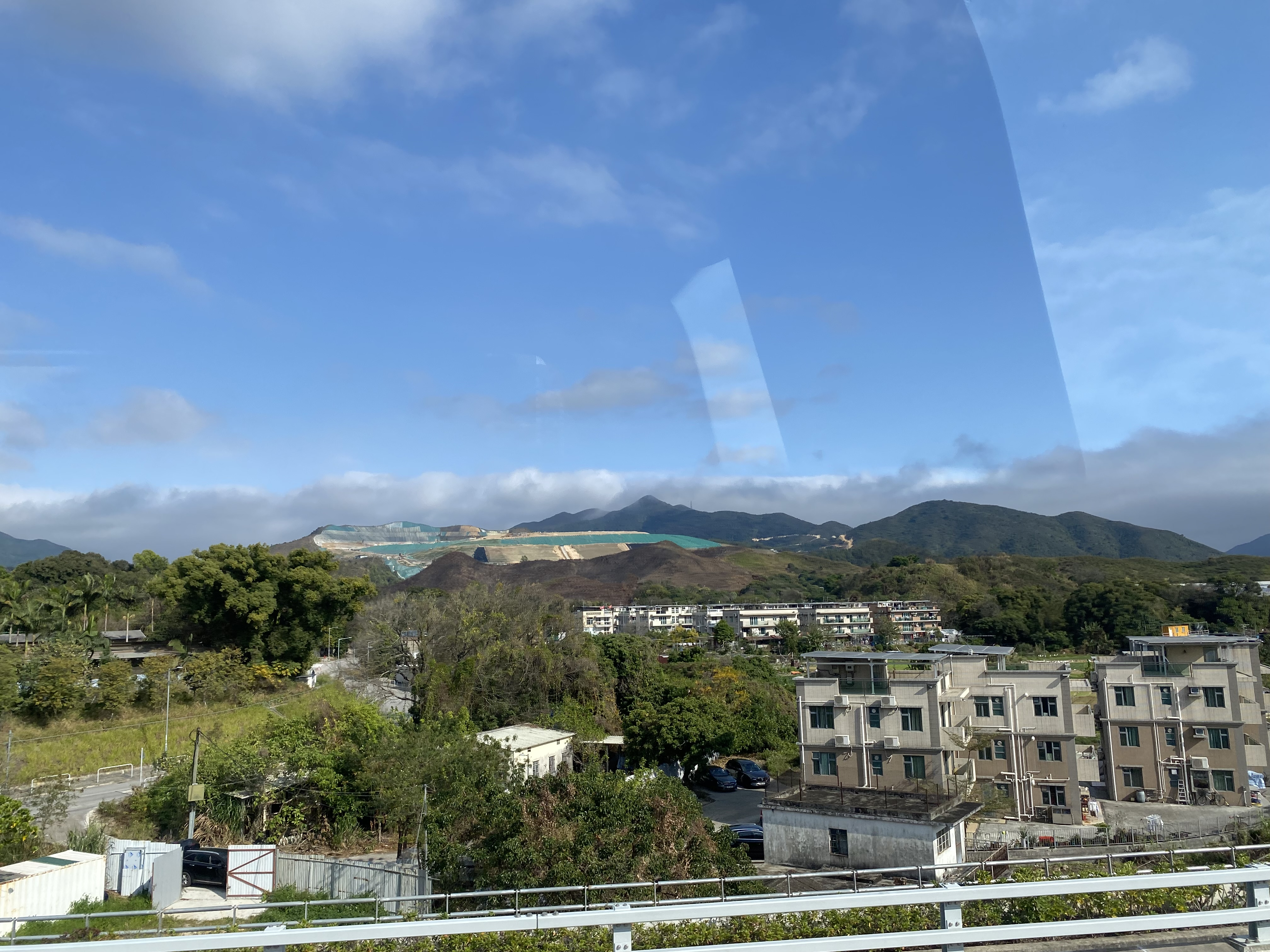
View of Chuk Yuen from Heung Yuen Wai Highway. The North East New Territories Landfill and Robin's Nest are visible in the background.

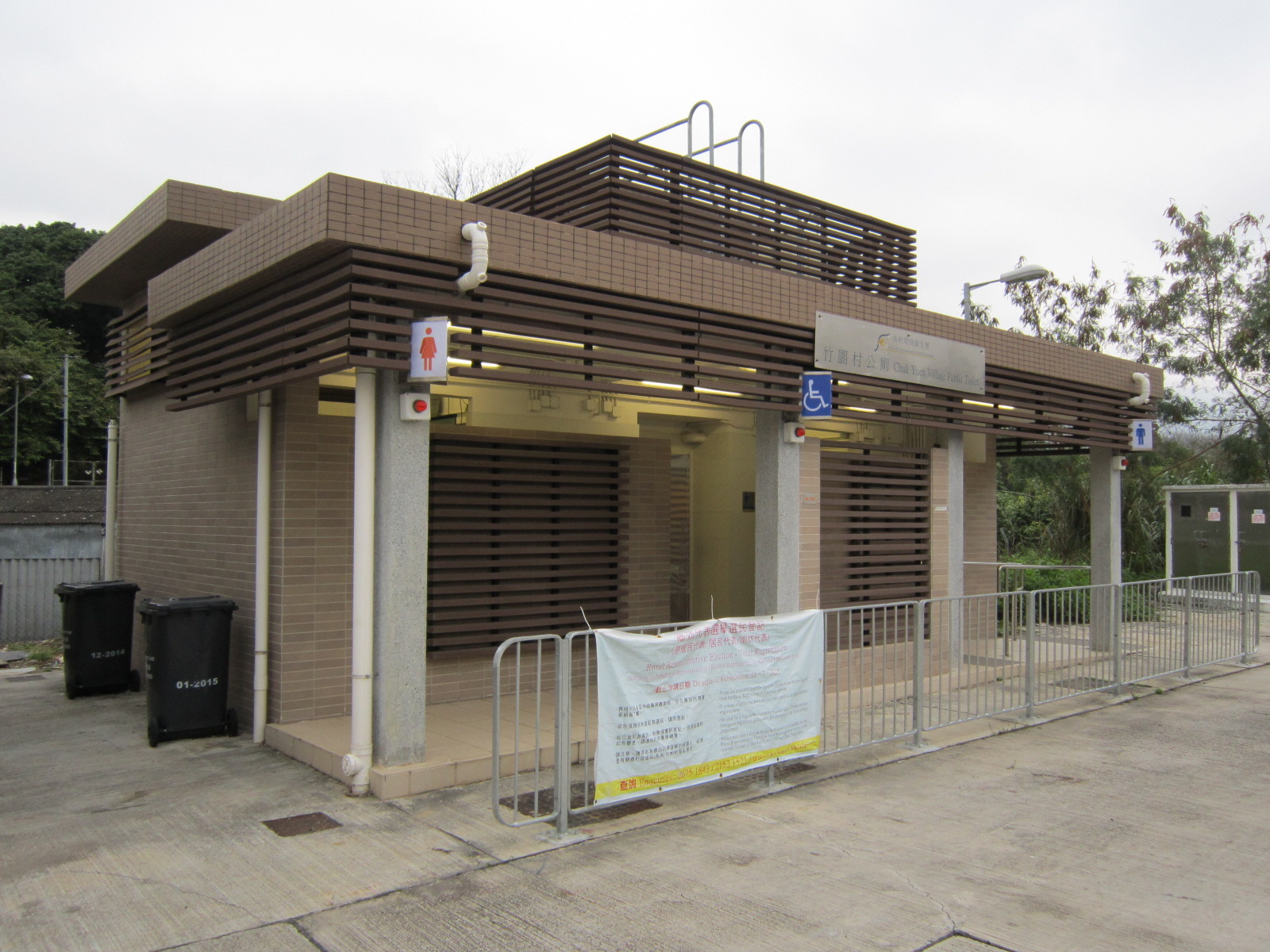
Public toilet in Chuk Yuen

Chuk Yuen (Chinese: 竹園) or Chuk Yuen Village (Chinese: 竹園村) is a village in Ta Kwu Ling, North District, Hong Kong.

== Administration ==
Chuk Yuen is a recognized village under the New Territories Small House Policy. It is one of the villages represented within the Ta Kwu Ling District Rural Committee. For electoral purposes, Chuk Yuen is part of the Sha Ta constituency, which is currently represented by Ko Wai-kei.

== History ==
At the time of the 1911 census, the population of Chuk Yuen was 44. The number of males was 18.
