= Tai Po Tin =

Village in Ta Kwu Ling, Hong Kong

Coordinates: 22.527645°N 114.152063°E

Tai Po Tin (Chinese: 大埔田) is a village in Ta Kwu Ling, North District, Hong Kong.

== Administration ==
Tai Po Tin is a recognized village under the New Territories Small House Policy.

== History ==
At the time of the 1911 census, the population of Tai Po Tin was 56. The number of males was 25.
