= Sha Chau Lei =

Village in Ha Tsuen, Yuen Long District, Hong Kong

Coordinates: 22.445252°N 113.995614°E

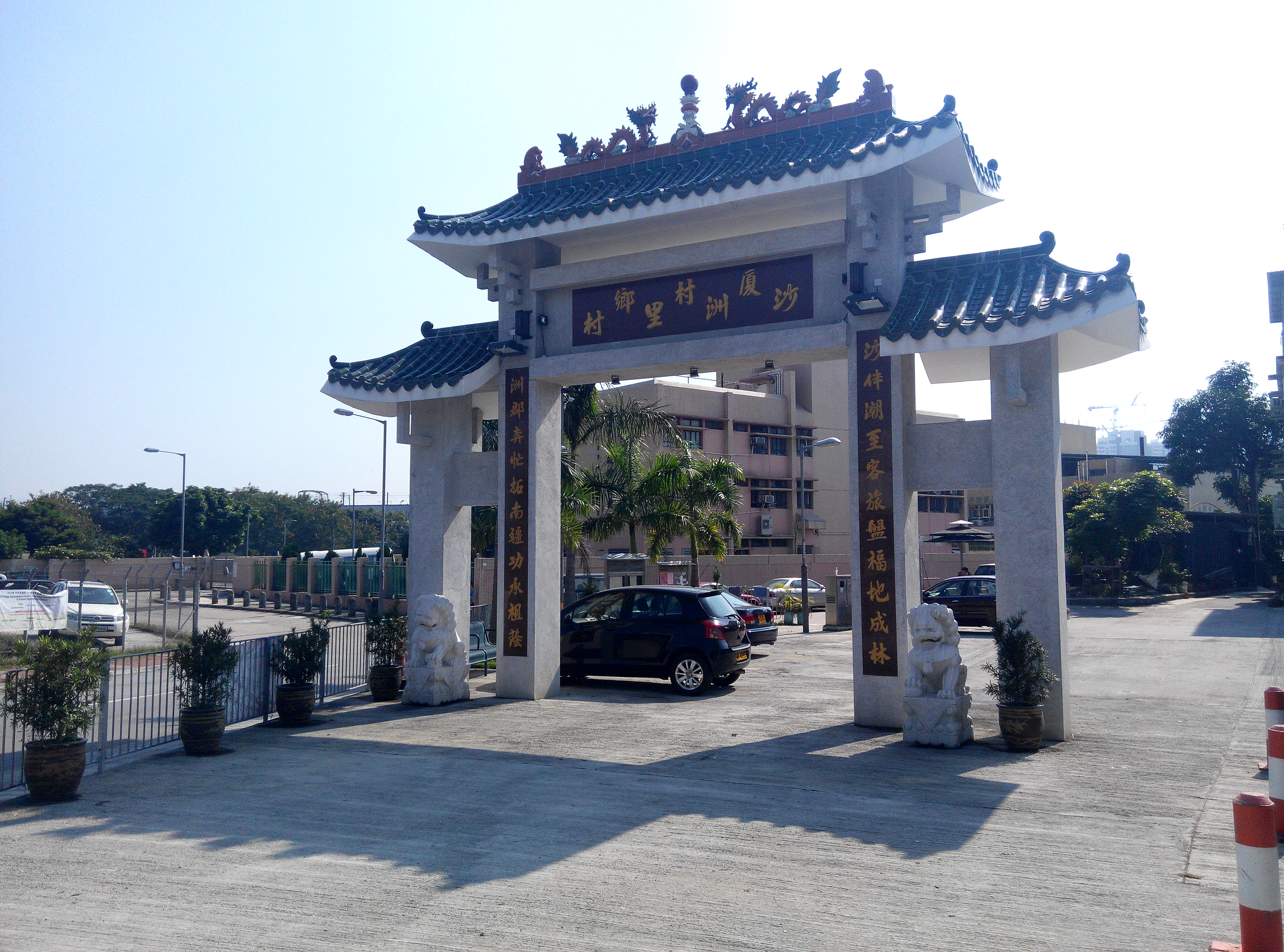
Archway of Sha Chau Lei in December 2014.

Sha Chau Lei (Chinese: 沙洲里) is a village in Ha Tsuen, Yuen Long District, Hong Kong.

== Administration ==
For electoral purposes, Sha Chau Lei is part of the Ha Tsuen constituency.
