= Sheung Shan Kai Wat =

Village in Ta Kwu Ling, Hong Kong

Coordinates: 22.522832°N 114.150582°E

Sheung Shan Kai Wat (Chinese: 上山雞乙) is a village in Ta Kwu Ling, North District, Hong Kong.

== Administration ==
Shan Kai Wat is a recognized village under the New Territories Small House Policy.

== See also ==
- Ha Shan Kai Wat
