= Ha Tsuen Shi =

Village of Hong Kong

Coordinates: 22.447125°N 113.992639°E

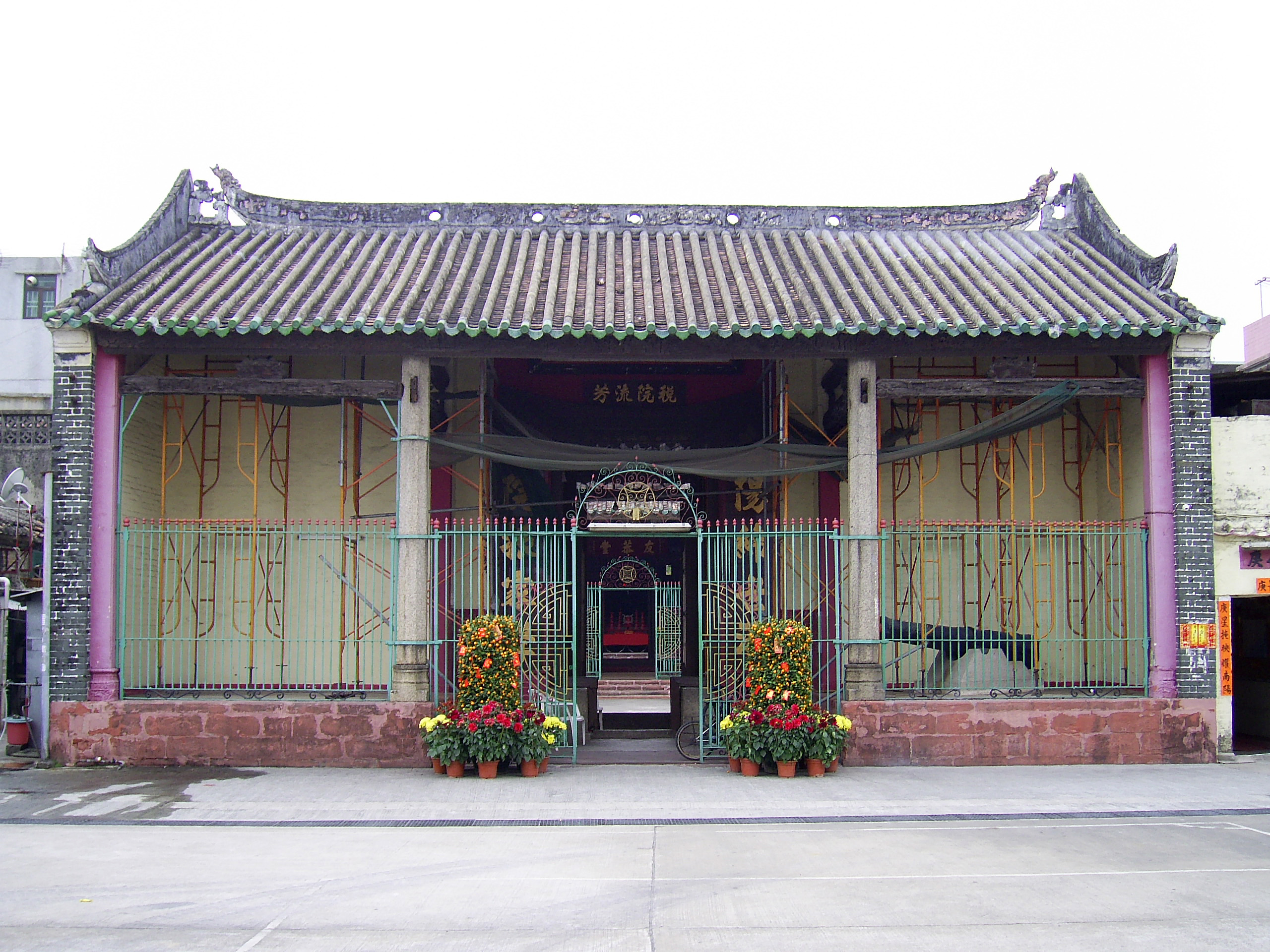
Tang Ancestral Hall in Ha Tsuen Shi.

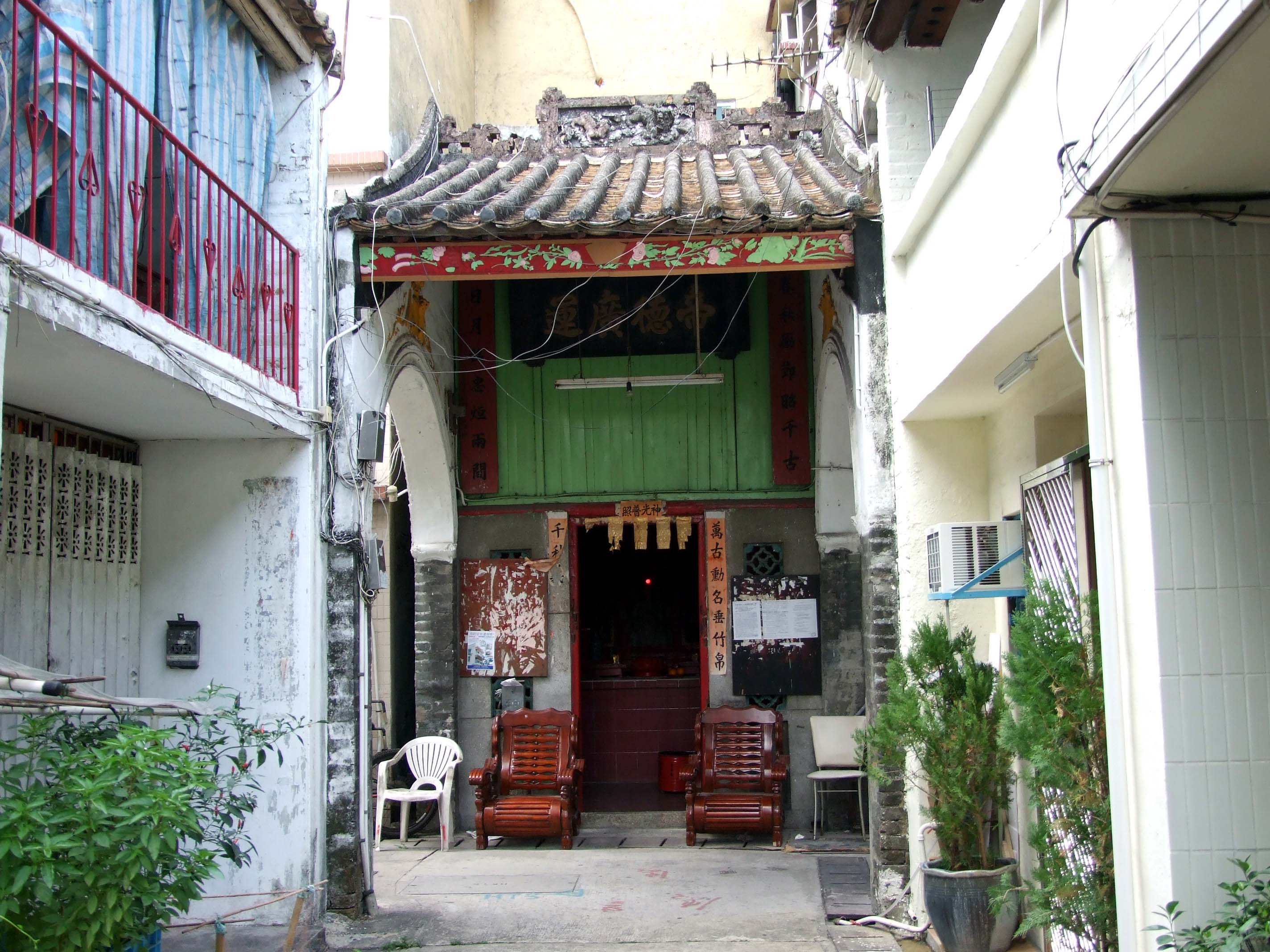
Kwan Tai Temple in Ha Tsuen Shi.

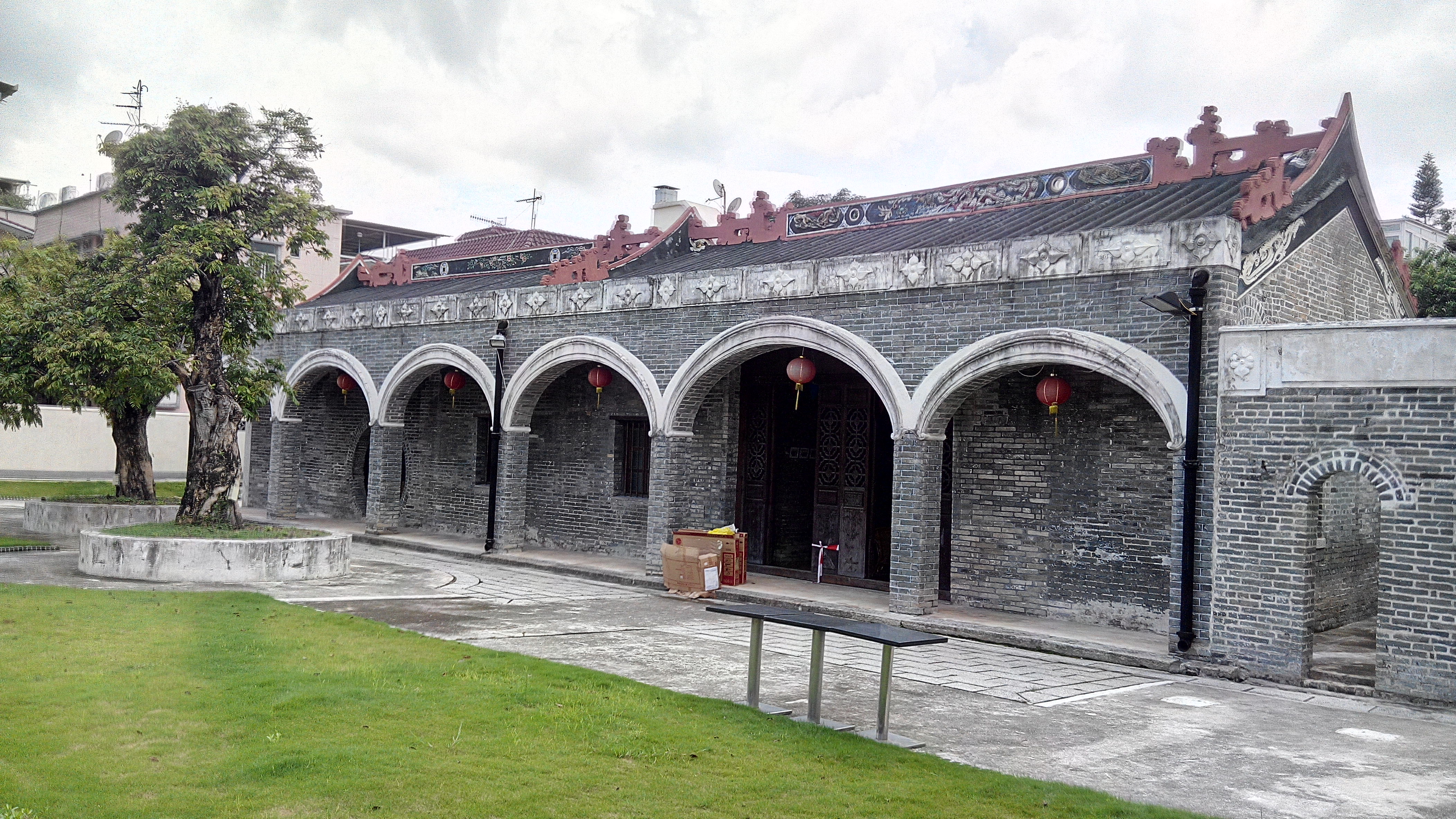
Yau Kung School in Ha Tsuen Shi.

Ha Tsuen Shi (Chinese: 厦村市) is a village Ha Tsuen, Yuen Long District, Hong Kong.

== Administration ==
Ha Tsuen Shi is a recognized village under the New Territories Small House Policy. For electoral purposes, Ha Tsuen Shi is part of the Ha Tsuen constituency.

== History ==
At the time of the 1911 census, the population of Ha Tsuen Shi was 178. The number of males was 120.

== Features ==
- Tang Ancestral Hall (鄧氏宗祠), also known as Yau Kung Tong (友恭堂), was constructed by the Tang Clan of Ha Tsuen to commemorate their two founding ancestors, Tang Hung-chi and Tang Hung-wai, for establishing the village settlements in Ha Tsuen. Construction of the Ancestral Hall began in 1749 and was completed in 1750. It is a declared monument.
- Yau Kung School (友恭學校), a declared monument
- Gate Tower of Ha Tsuen Shi. It was one of the gate towers built for the protection of the Ha Tsuen Shi market. Called the East Gate of the market, it is the only surviving old gate tower of the market. It is a Grade II historic building
- Kwan Tai Temple, a Grade II historic building
