= Chow Tin Tsuen =

Village in Hong Kong

Coordinates: 22.535984°N 114.145249°E

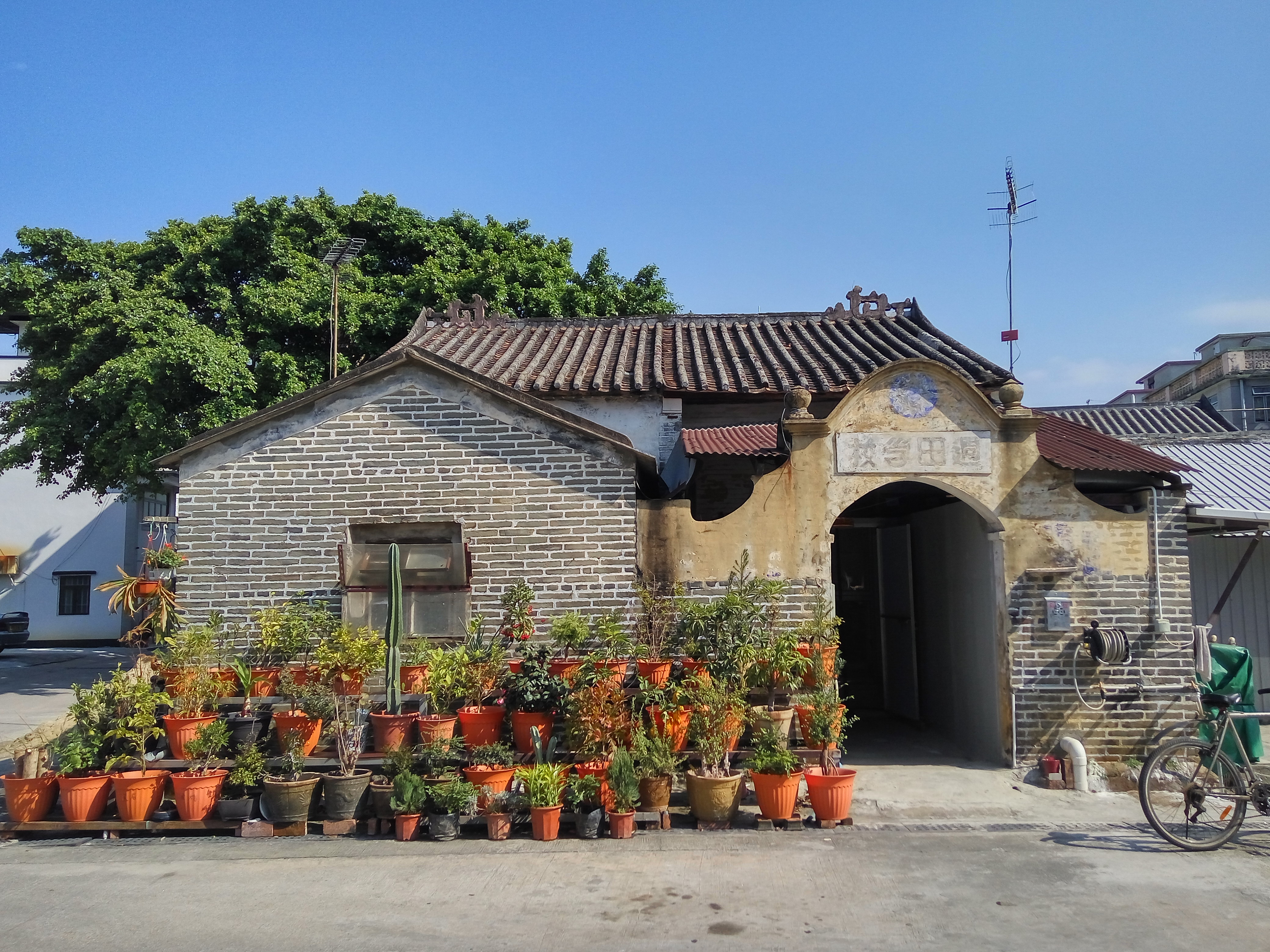
Former Chow Tin School in Chow Tin Tsuen.

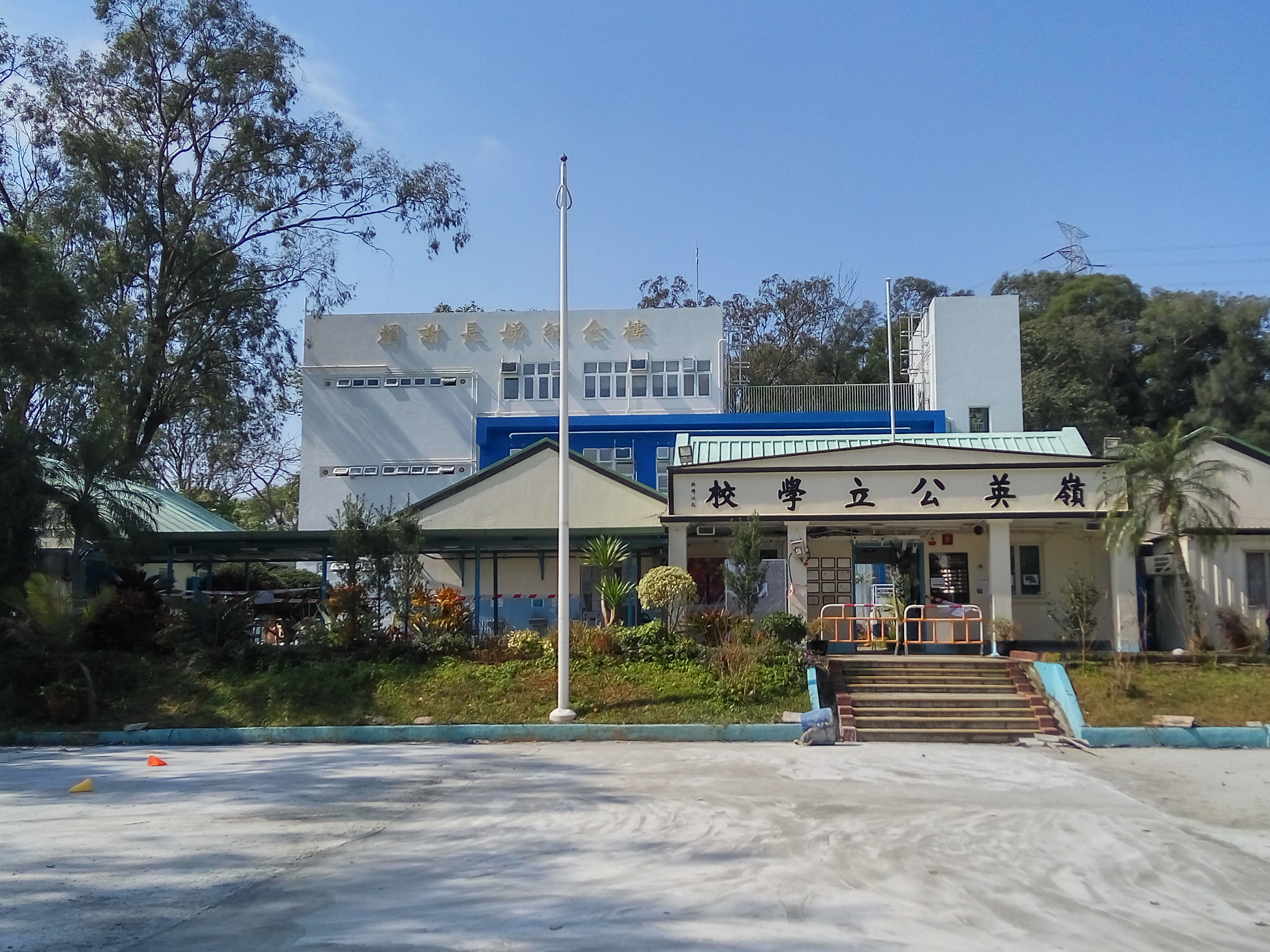
Ta Ku Ling Ling Ying Public School in Chow Tin Tsuen.

Chow Tin Tsuen (Chinese: 週田村) is a village in the Ta Kwu Ling area of North District, Hong Kong.

== History ==
Chow Tin Tsuen was first inhabited in the 17th century by the members of the To (杜) clan, who were Hakka from Dongguan in Guangdong province. The village was later settled by members of the Siu (蕭) and Ho (何) clans in the late 19th century.

== Features ==
The historical village comprises six rows of houses facing northwest.
