= Ma Tso Lung =

Village in Sheung Shui, Hong Kong

Coordinates: 22.5201413°N 114.1003914°E

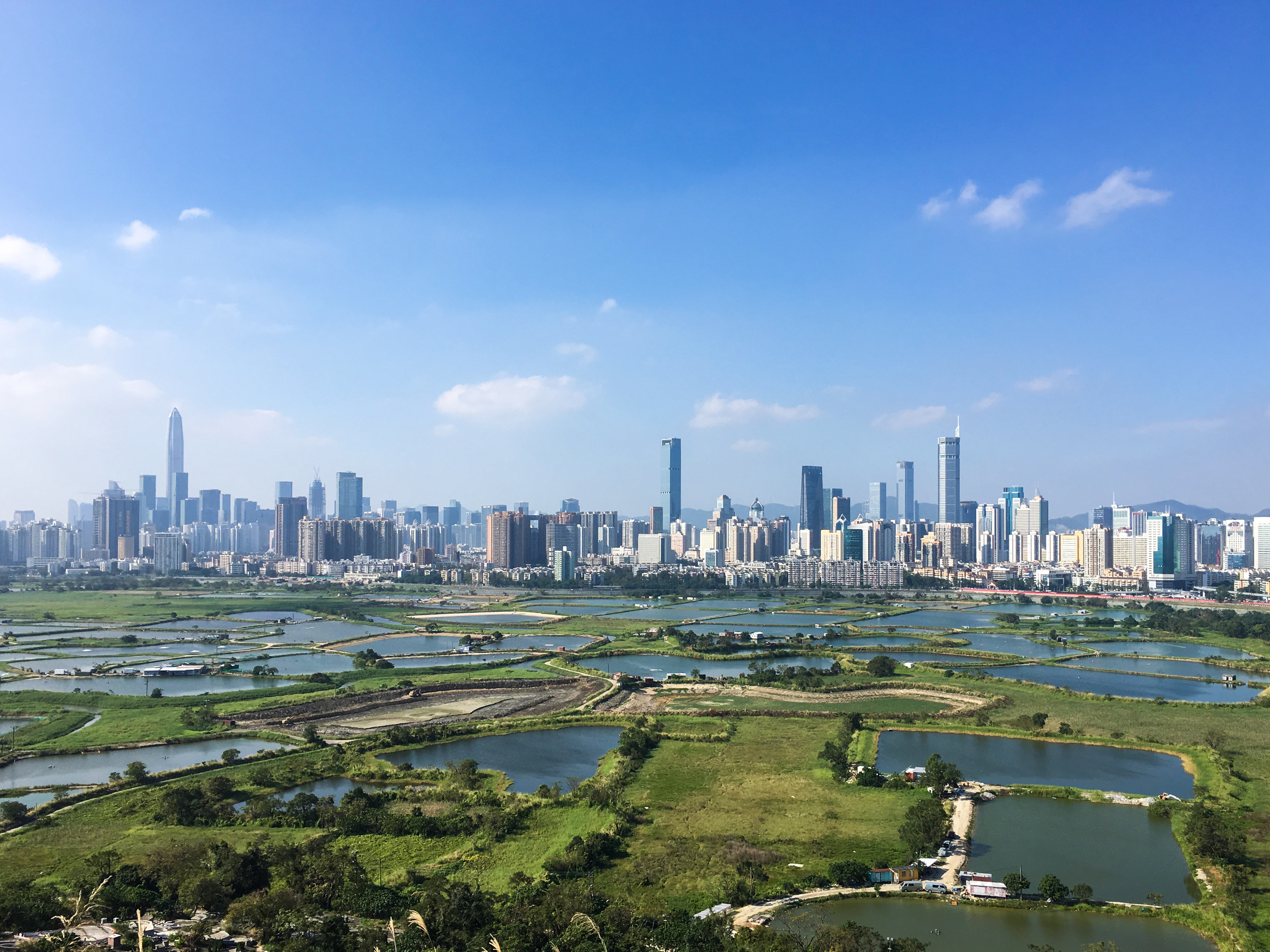
View of Shenzhen from Ma Tso Lung.

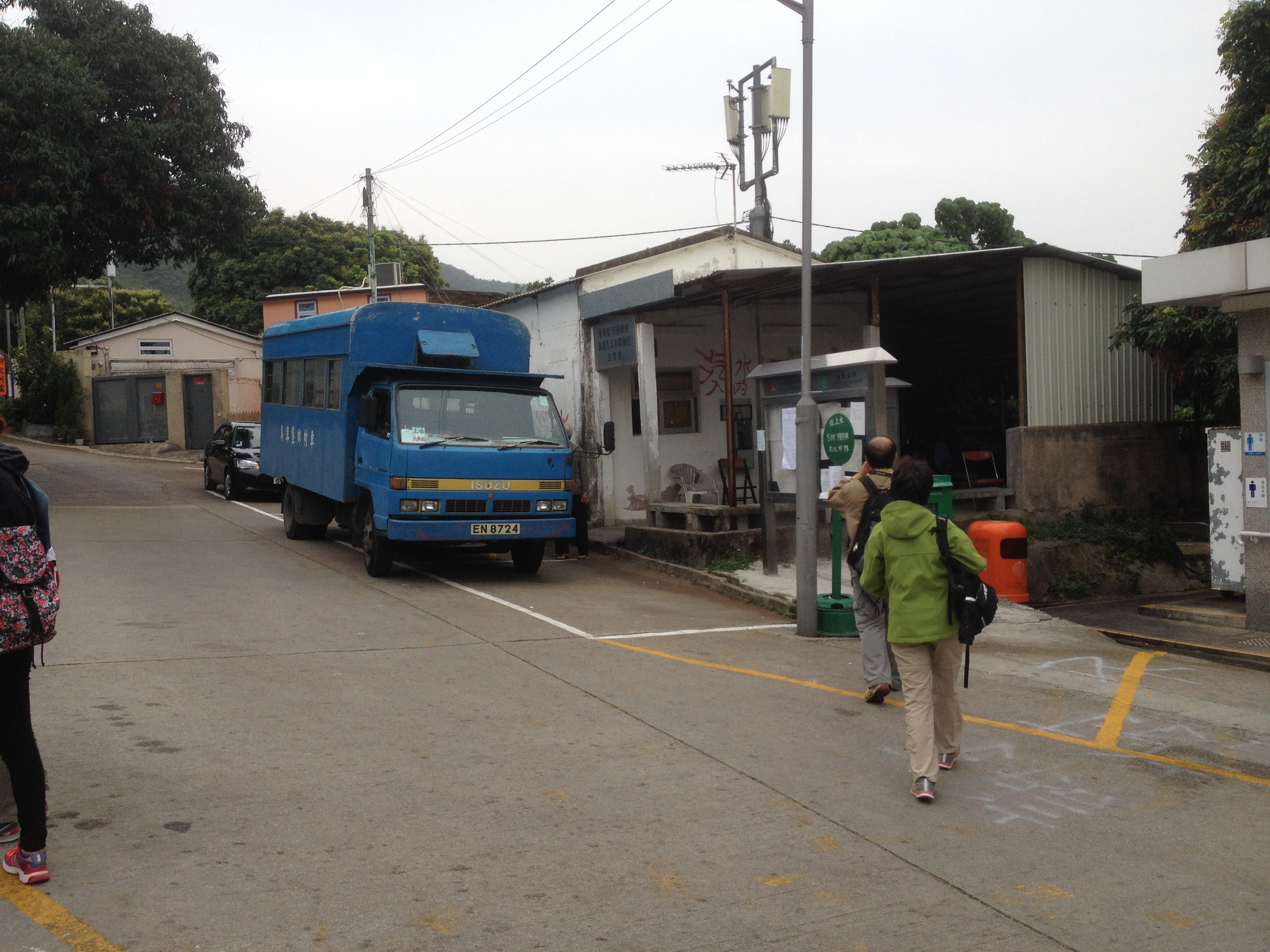
Ma Tso Lung bus terminus.

Ma Tso Lung (Chinese: 馬草壟) is a village in Sheung Shui, North District, Hong Kong.

== Administration ==
Ma Tso Lung is one of the villages represented within the Sheung Shui District Rural Committee. For electoral purposes, Ma Tso Lung is part of the Sheung Shui Rural constituency, which is currently represented by Simon Hau Fuk-tat.

== See also ==
- MacIntosh Forts
