= Fung Wong Wu =

Village in Ta Kwu Ling, Hong Kong

Coordinates: 22.537066°N 114.147442°E

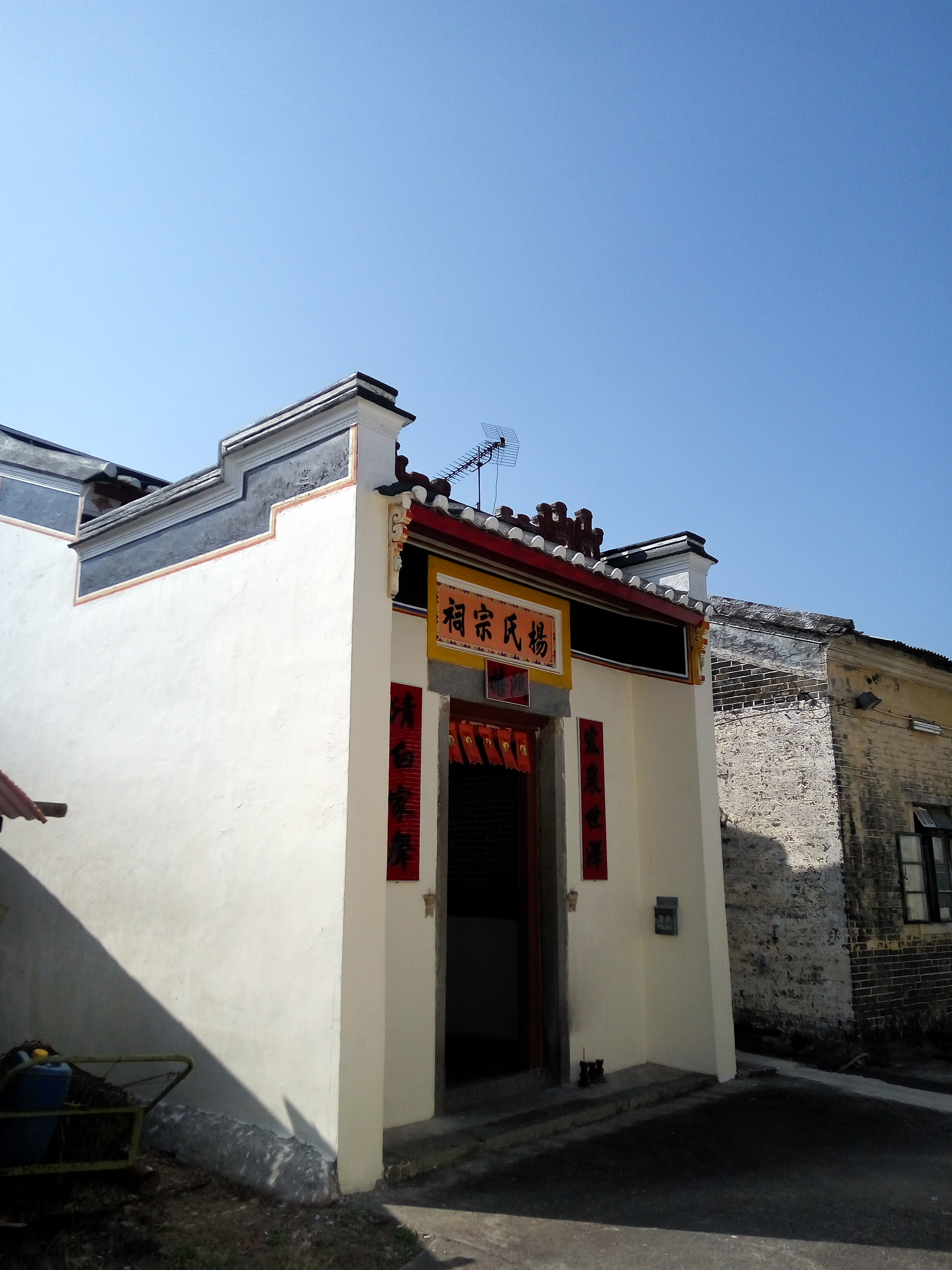
Yeung Ancestral Hall in Fung Wong Wu.

Fung Wong Wu (Chinese: 鳳凰湖) is a village in Ta Kwu Ling, North District, Hong Kong.

== Administration ==
Fung Wong Wu is a recognized village under the New Territories Small House Policy.

== History ==
At the time of the 1911 census, the population of Fung Wong Wu was 84. The number of males was 39.
