= Muk Wu =

Punti walled village in Hong Kong

Coordinates: 22.539359°N 114.1331°E

- Traditional Chinese: 木湖村
Transcriptions
Yue: Cantonese
- Yale Romanization: Muhk wùh chyūn
- Jyutping: Muk6 wu4 cyun1

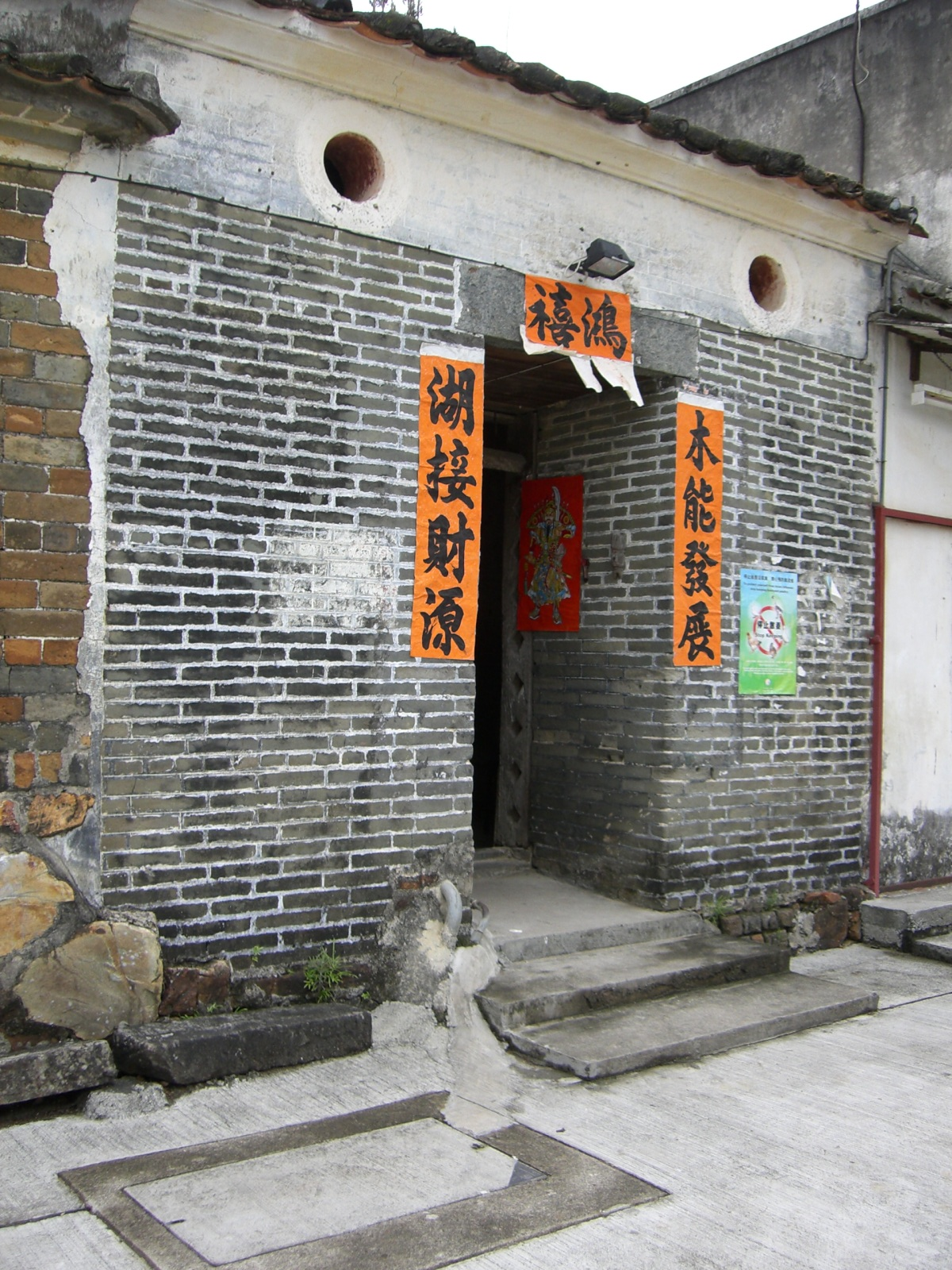
Muk Wu Village door (gate tower)

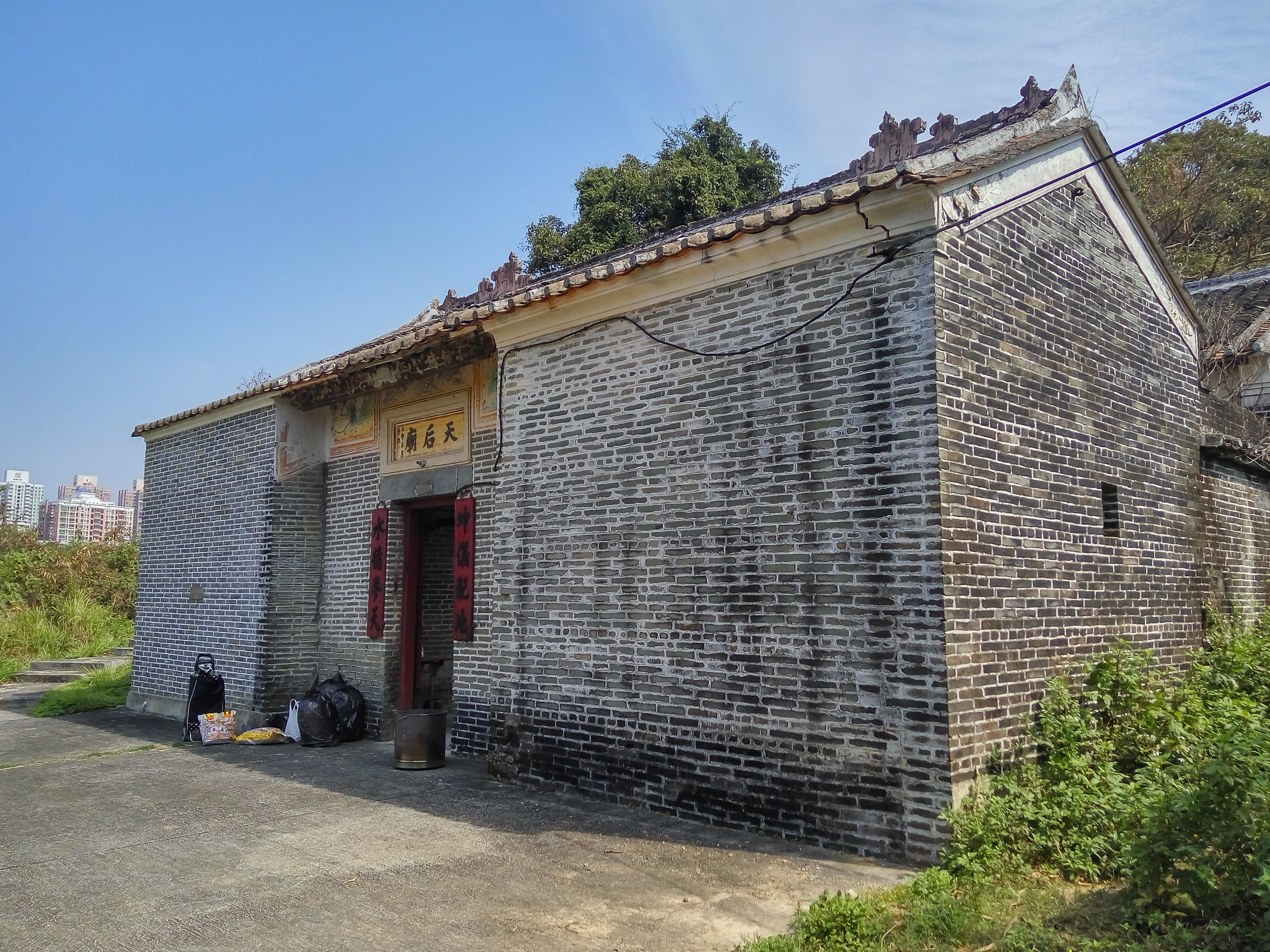
Muk Wu Village Temple, dedicated to Tin Hau.

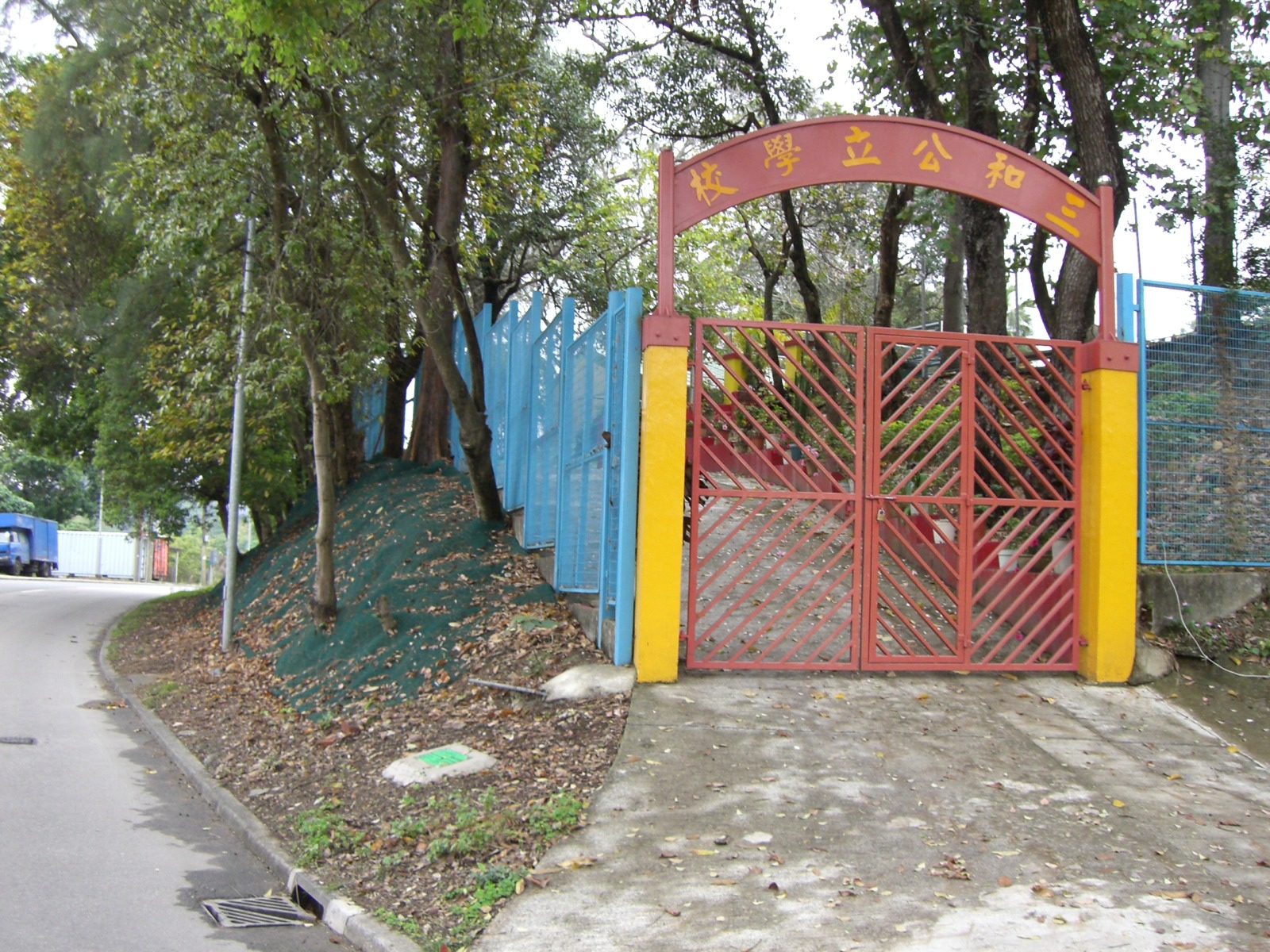
Sam Wo Public School in Muk Wu Village on Tsung Chai Ling off Lin Ma Hang Road

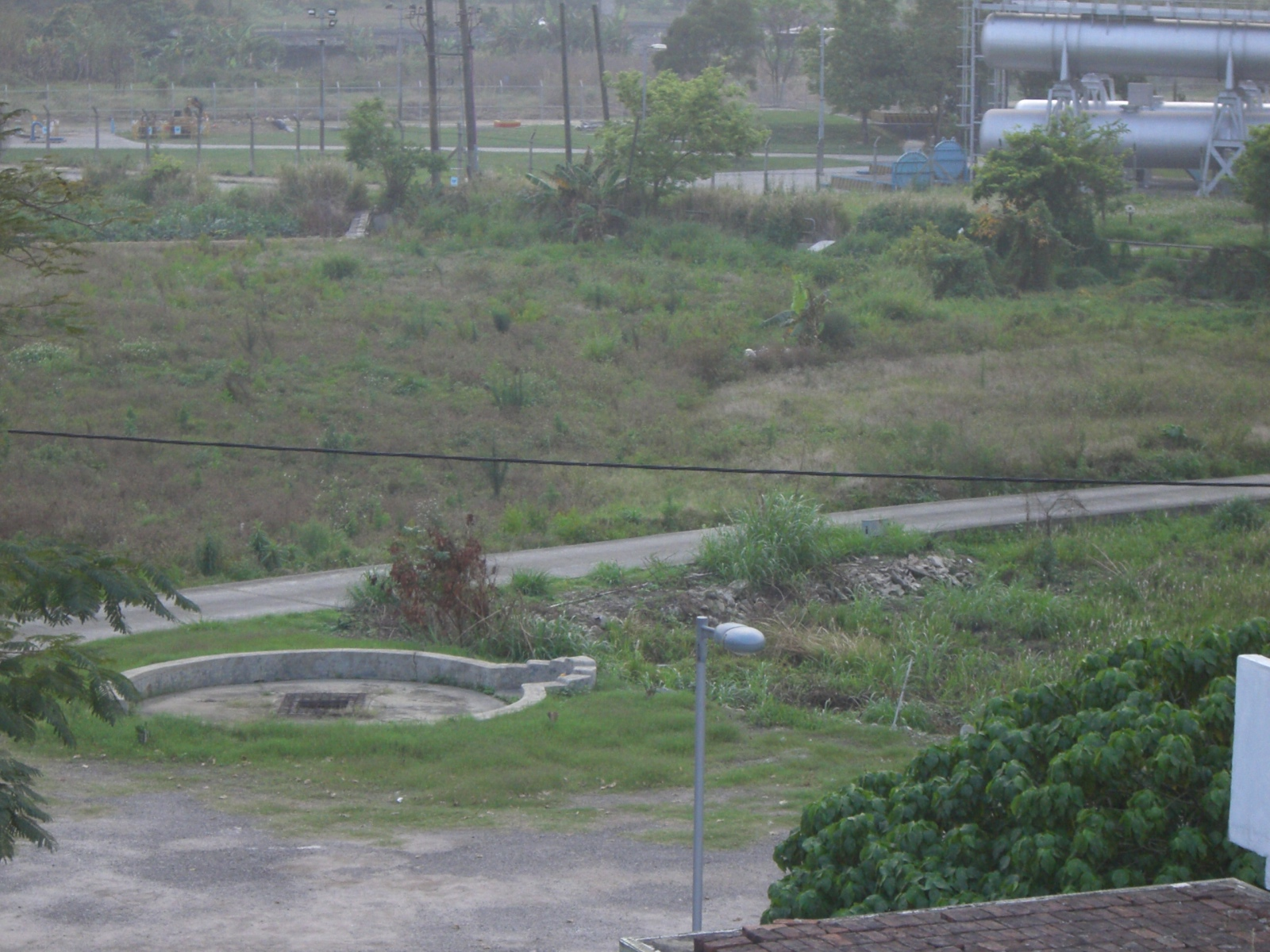
A large water well in Muk Wu.

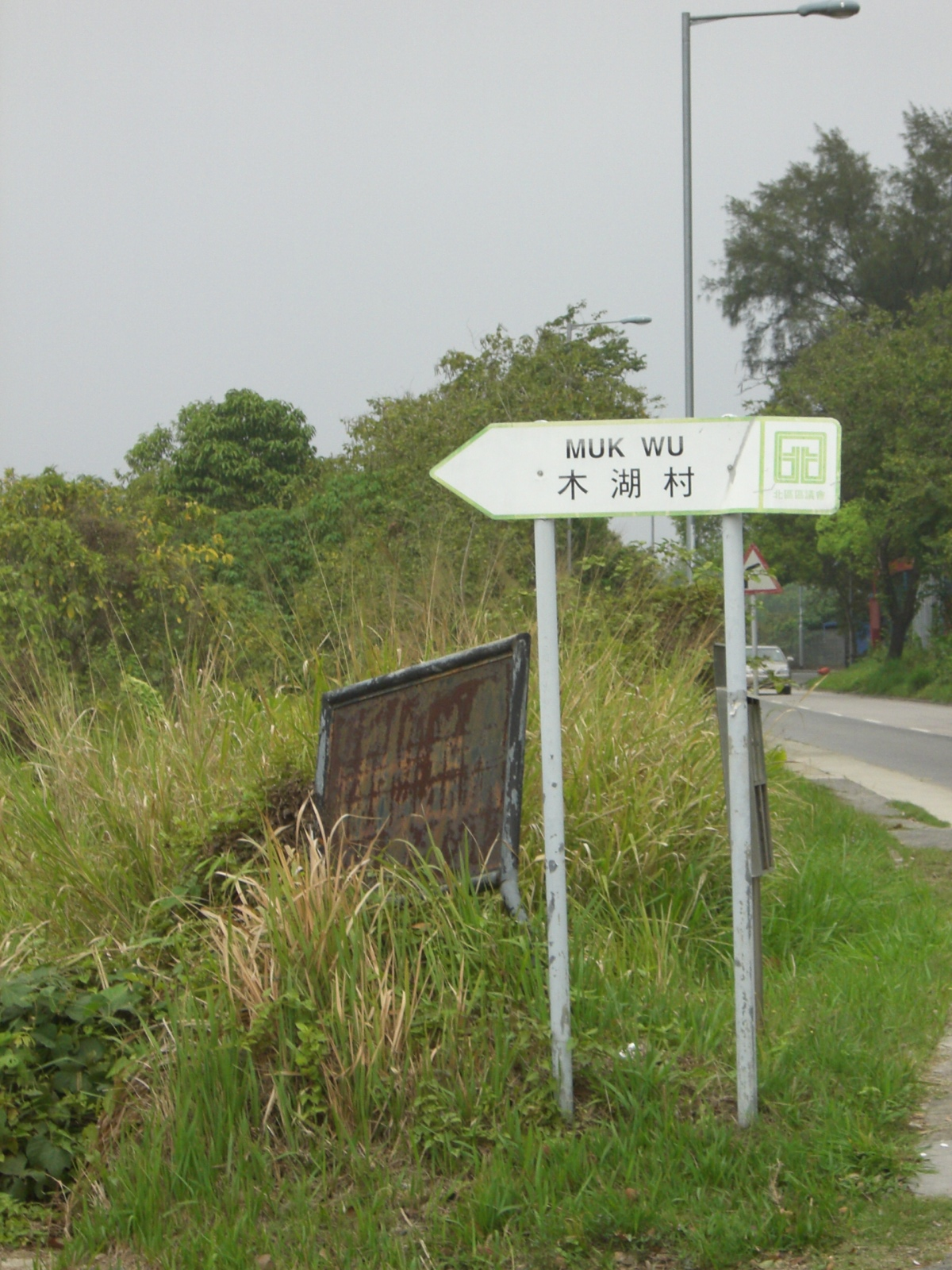
Muk Wu Village sign post

Muk Wu Village (Chinese: 木湖村) is a Punti walled village in Ta Kwu Ling, in the north of the New Territories across the Man Kam To border crossing point in Hong Kong.

Before 4 January 2016, it was inaccessible to non-permit holders (see Closed Area Permit). These were obtained in Fanling, Sheung Shui Closed Area Permit police station. As the name suggests, originally the village had fertile land with trees and streams derived from the Chinese characters: "wood" (木); "lake" (湖). This name derived from the location on the northern periphery right next to the border fence; the Shenzhen River is only a few feet away.

== Administration ==
Muk Wu is a recognized village under the New Territories Small House Policy. It is one of the villages represented within the Ta Kwu Ling District Rural Committee. For electoral purposes, Muk Wu is part of the Sha Ta constituency, which is currently represented by Ko Wai-kei.

== Features ==
The village road meanders down into the village court and main door. This gate tower and stone floor has the original Qing dynasty design; a few houses have been unoccupied.

Within the village there also stands a Tin Hau Temple, village hall (sun teng) or shrine and several Ancestral rooms (xi fong). The temple is decorated and very well kept by the villagers. It was built around 1912-1913. It is located about 50 metres away left as one faces the village door.

Man-made water wells are plentiful but the main one where most villagers used to draw water from is large in comparison. Its disuse came about when alternative means of transporting water was sought. Efficient and effective land cultivation was of prime importance and therefore improvements of water pipe systems obviously meant that they no longer had to depend on it.

Going through the village gate tower straight down the narrow lane is a derelict building called the village hall (shrine). This building was used for worshiping of idols, wedding receptions, birth ancestral registrations and village gatherings. The two walled partitions can clearly be identified and one half was once used as a school. Ancestral rooms look similar to residential houses from the outside but the presence of idols and offerings is a common feature.

There have been archeological finds of ancient kilns unearthed in Muk Wu; details of this can be found in the Hong Kong Museum of History. The famous Muk Wu pumping station is also notable.

Apart from the architecture of Muk Wu, nature and wildlife abound, with great Egrets visiting from time to time, and an abundance of exotic insects during hot seasons.

== Settlers (The Punti people) ==
The village's original settlers were: "To" (杜), "Wong" (黄) and "Yam"(任), where "To" (杜) remained the dominant surname even at present. Today, there are various families from China unrelated to the early settlers. Each clan's surname has a remarkable history. "To" (杜) clan trace their roots back to East of Chang'an present day Xi'an, Shaanxi in China.

At the time of the 1911 census, the population of Muk Wu was 174. The number of males was 81.

Today, there are only a handful of indigenous villagers living in Muk Wu and visiting relatives of the "To" (杜) clan. The Chinese festivals such as: Mid-Autumn festival (中秋節), Chinese New Year, Ching Ming (清明節) and Chung Yeung (重陽節) "paying homage to ancestors", attract most tourists and relations of the clans to reunite. During these public holidays especially Ching Ming and Chung Yeung the bus services are very busy and passengers pack buses to the full. The occasion can be quite a sight and the atmosphere is most welcoming and cheerful.

== See also ==
- Walled villages of Hong Kong
- List of villages in Hong Kong
- Tan Si Chong Su Ancestral Hall
- List of Chinese surnames and their meanings
- Nga Yiu aka. Muk Wu Nga Yiu, a nearby village
