= Tang Ancestral Hall (Ha Tsuen) =

Ancestral hall in Hong Kong

Coordinates: 22.447072°N 113.993038°E

- 廈村鄧氏宗祠
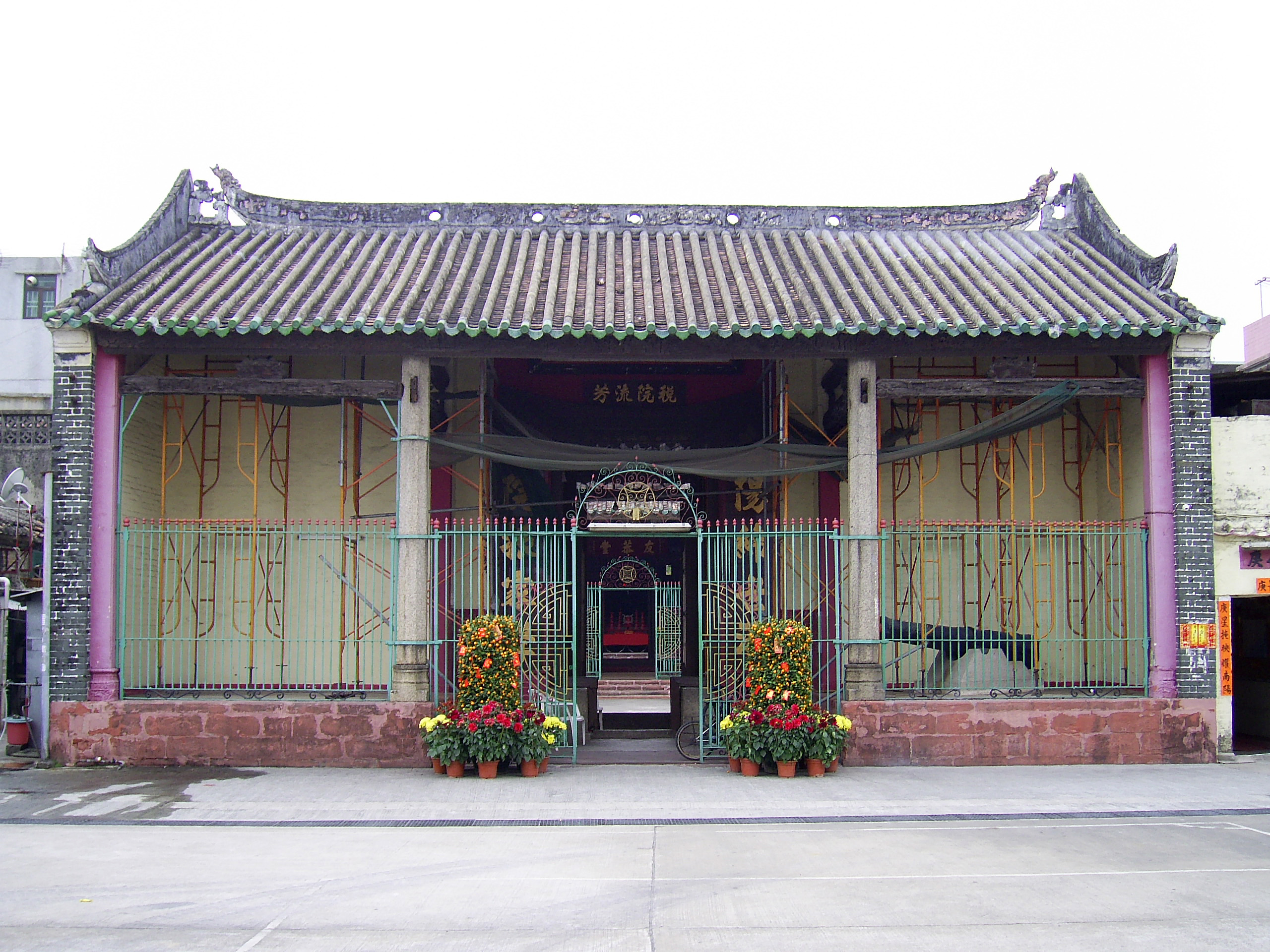
- Tang Ancestral Hall in Ha Tsuen
- Alternative names: Yau Kung Tong (友恭堂)

General information
- Type: Ancestral hall
- Architectural style: Traditional Chinese
- Location: Ha Tsuen Shi, Ha Tsuen, Yuen Long District, Hong Kong
- Completed: 1750
- Owner: Tang Clan of Ha Tsuen

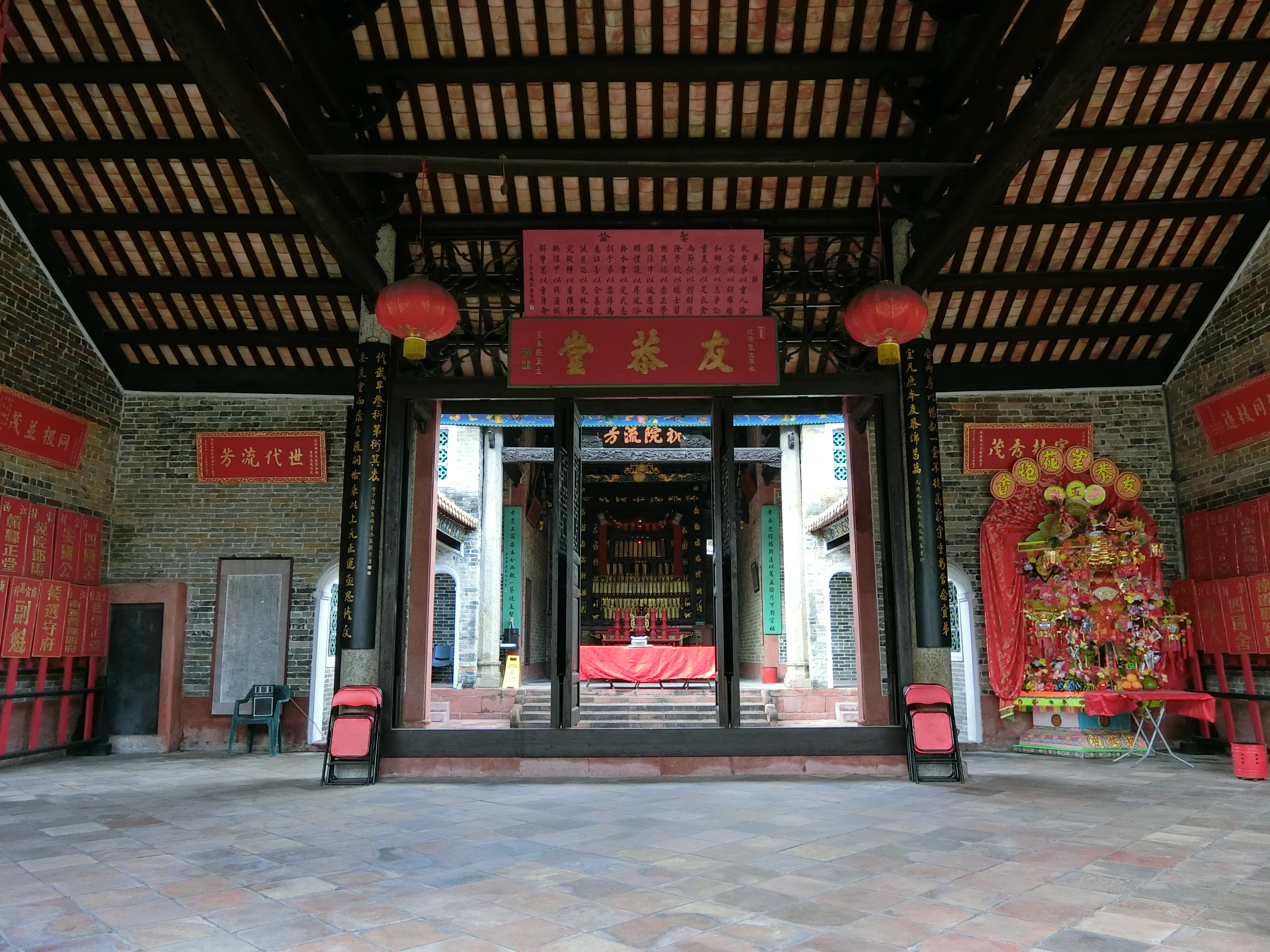
Interior of Tang Ancestral Hall.

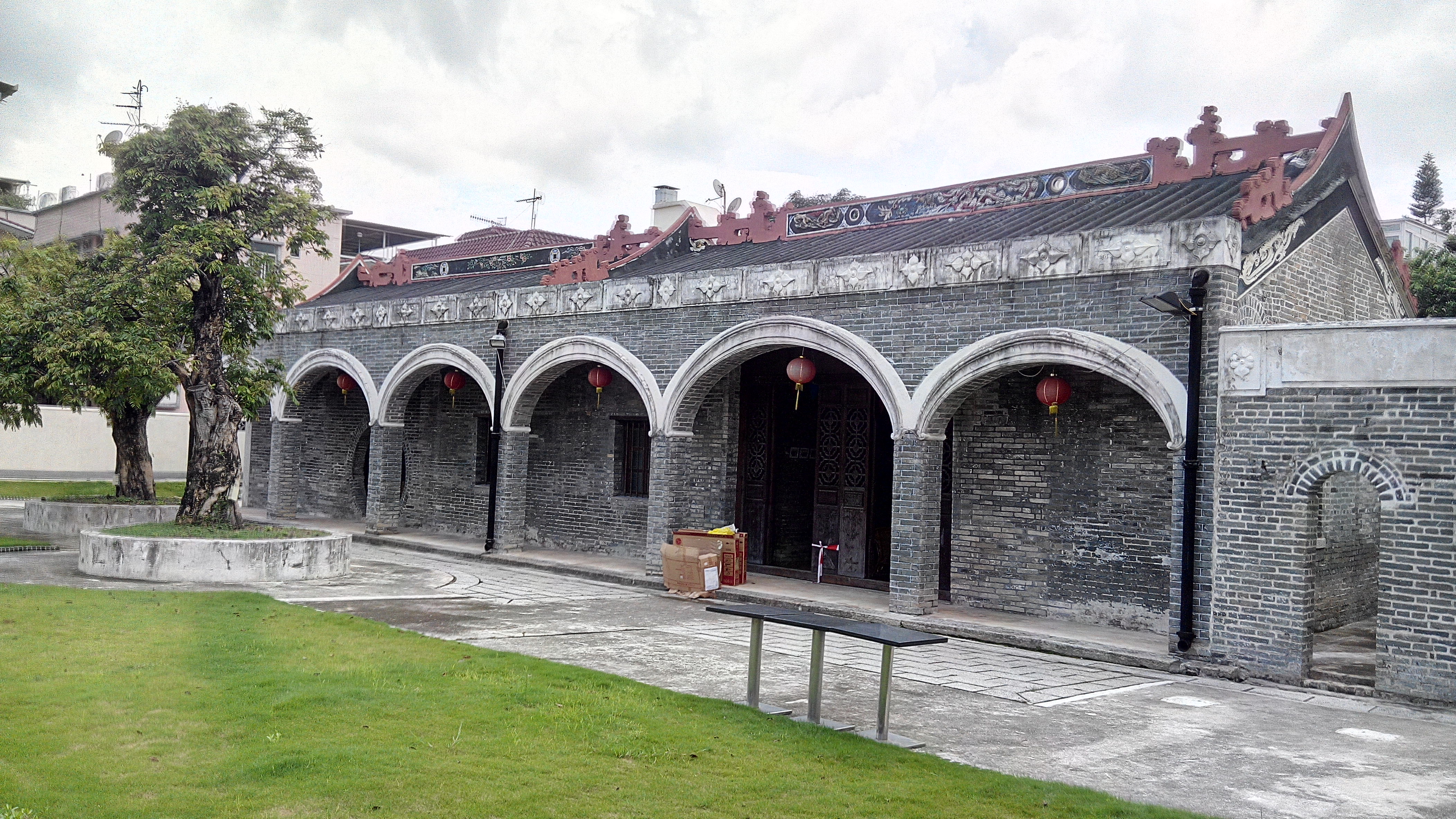
Yau Kung School (友恭學校), part of the Tang Ancestral Hall compound.

Tang Ancestral Hall (廈村鄧氏宗祠), also known as Yau Kung Tong (友恭堂) is an ancestral hall of the Tang Clan, located in Ha Tsuen Shi, in Ha Tsuen, Yuen Long District, Hong Kong. it is a declared monument.

== History ==
Tang Ancestral Hall was constructed by the Tang Clan of Ha Tsuen to commemorate their two founding ancestors, Tang Hung-chi and Tang Hung-wai, for establishing the village settlements in Ha Tsuen. Construction of the Ancestral Hall began in 1749 and was completed in 1750.

== See also ==
- Tang Ancestral Hall (Ping Shan), a declared monument
- Tang Chung Ling Ancestral Hall, a declared monument
