= Lee Uk Tsuen =

Coordinates: 22.436769°N 113.993047°E

Lee Uk Tsuen, also transliterated as Lei Uk Tsuen, (Chinese: 李屋村) is a village Ha Tsuen, Yuen Long District, Hong Kong.

San Lee Uk Tsuen (新李屋村; 'New Lee Uk Tsuen') forms a part of Lee Uk Tsuen, while Kau Uk Tsuen (舊李屋村; 'Old Lee Uk Tsuen') is located to the north.

== Administration ==
Lee Uk Tsuen is a recognized village under the New Territories Small House Policy.

== History ==
At the time of the 1911 census, the population of Lei Uk was 48. The number of males was 32.
